= × Leucomoza =

Scientific classification
- Kingdom: Plantae
- Clade: Tracheophytes
- Clade: Angiosperms
- Clade: Eudicots
- Order: Caryophyllales
- Family: Cactaceae
- Subfamily: Cactoideae
- Tribe: Cereeae
- Subtribe: Trichocereinae
- Genus: × Leucomoza; M.H.J.van der Meer 2021
- Species: × L. roseiflora

Binomial name
- × Leucomoza roseiflora (Font & Picca) M.H.J.van der Meer

Genus of plant

× Leucomoza is a monotypic genus of cacti (family Cactaceae) that consist of hybrids between Denmoza and Leucostele. Its only species is × Leucomoza roseiflora, a natural hybrid of Denmoza rhodacantha × Leucostele atacamensis.

== Distribution ==
× Leucomoza roseiflora is found in Salta, Argentina.
