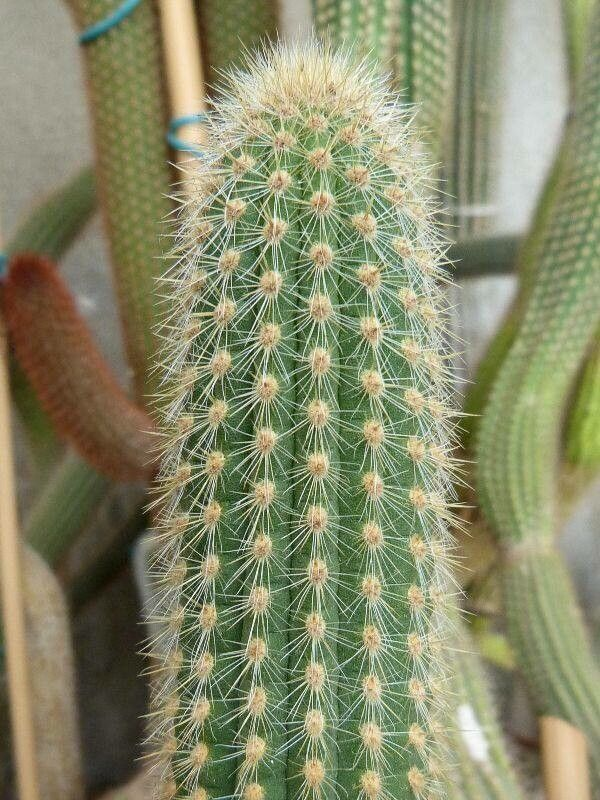

Conservation status
- Data Deficient (IUCN 3.1)

Scientific classification
- Kingdom: Plantae
- Clade: Tracheophytes
- Clade: Angiosperms
- Clade: Eudicots
- Order: Caryophyllales
- Family: Cactaceae
- Subfamily: Cactoideae
- Tribe: Cereeae
- Subtribe: Trichocereinae
- Genus: Cephalocleistocactus; F.Ritter
- Species: C. chrysocephalus

Binomial name
- Cephalocleistocactus chrysocephalus F.Ritter

Synonyms
- Cleistocactus chrysocephalus (F.Ritter) Mottram 2002

= Cephalocleistocactus =

Species of flowering plant

Cephalocleistocactus is a monotypic genus of flowering plants belonging to the family Cactaceae. It contains just one species, Cephalocleistocactus chrysocephalus.

== Description ==
Cephalocleistocactus chrysocephalus is an evergreen, perennial columnar cactus, with branching shoots reaching lengths of up to 2–5 meters with diameters of 3 to 5 centimeters with 14 ribs. The areoles on it are 5 to 8 mm apart. The 6 bright yellow central spine is up to 7–30 mm long. The 15 radial spines are yellowish and 7 mm long.

The diurnal, self sterile, straight, yellow to red flowers are 5 centimeters long. The fruits are greenish red, 2 x 3 centimeters. Seeds are smooth, black and 0.7 mm.

== Distribution ==
Plants are found in slopes of seasonally dry valleys in the Yungas at elevations between 1900 and 2500 meters. The plant is rarely seen in habitat.

== Taxonomy ==
This species was first collected in Inquisivi Province in the Department of La Paz, Bolivia, and described in 1959 by Friedrich Ritter. The plant was named after the golden color of the cephalium. The plant was placed in the genus Cephalocleistocactus based on longer and wider nectar chambers than Cleistocactus and the presecence of cephalium. It was moved to the genus Cleistocactus by Mottram in 2002 but later moved back to Cephalocleistocactus.
