= × Borzicana =

Scientific classification
- Kingdom: Plantae
- Clade: Tracheophytes
- Clade: Angiosperms
- Clade: Eudicots
- Order: Caryophyllales
- Family: Cactaceae
- Subfamily: Cactoideae
- Tribe: Cereeae
- Subtribe: Trichocereinae
- Genus: × Borzicana; M.H.J.van der Meer 2019
- Species: × B. mirabilis

Binomial name
- × Borzicana mirabilis (Buining) M.H.J.van der Meer 2019

Genus of plant

× Borzicana is a monotypic nothogenus of cacti (family Cactaceae) that consists of a hybrid between Borzicactus and Matucana. Its only species is × Borzicana mirabilis, which is a natural hybrid of Borzicactus fieldianus and Matucana haynii.

== Distribution ==
× Borzicana mirabilis is found in Arequipa, Peru.
