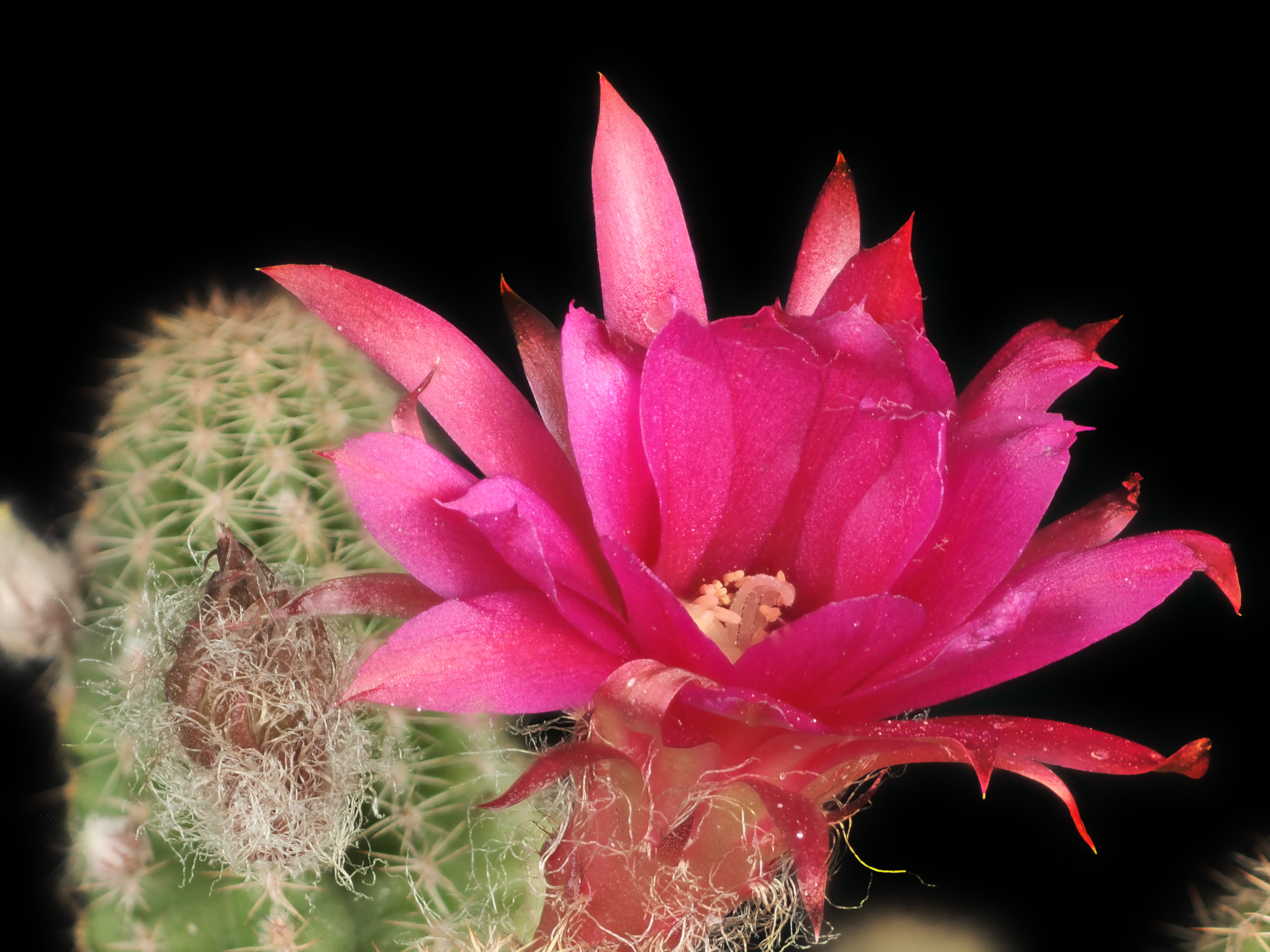
- One of many × Chamaelobivia hybrids

Scientific classification
- Kingdom: Plantae
- Clade: Tracheophytes
- Clade: Angiosperms
- Clade: Eudicots
- Order: Caryophyllales
- Family: Cactaceae
- Subfamily: Cactoideae
- Tribe: Cereeae
- Subtribe: Trichocereinae
- Genus: × Chamaelobivia; Y.Itô

Type species
- × Chamaelobivia tanahashii Y.Itô

= × Chamaelobivia =

Hybrid genus of cacti

× Chamaelobivia is a hybrid genus of flowering plants in the family Cactaceae. It is an artificial hybrid between Chamaecereus and Lobivia. The genus name was first published by Yoshi Itô in 1957.

Many cultivars have been produced from crosses between Chamaecereus and Lobivia, particularly at the Southfield Nursery in Lincolnshire, whose cultivar names usually begin 'Lincoln', e.g. 'Lincoln Gem'.

== Appearance ==
All × Chamaelobivia cultivars grow from a small, "peanut-like" cactus and have a medium-to-large flower on the top.
