= × Haagespostoa =

Scientific classification
- Kingdom: Plantae
- Clade: Tracheophytes
- Clade: Angiosperms
- Clade: Eudicots
- Order: Caryophyllales
- Family: Cactaceae
- Subfamily: Cactoideae
- Tribe: Cereeae
- Subtribe: Trichocereinae
- Genus: × Haagespostoa; G.D.Rowley

Species
- × Haagespostoa albisetata × Haagespostoa climaxantha × Haagespostoa mirabilis

Hybrid genus of cacti

× Haagespostoa is a hybrid genus of cacti, a natural hybrid between Haageocereus and Espostoa, exclusively found in Peru. Backeberg took this taxon for a new genus, and described it as Neobinghamia. According to Ostolaza (Quepo 2009), five taxa are known, all situated west of the Andes.

The genus × Haagespostoa is in the family Cactaceae in the major group Angiosperms (Flowering plants).

== Habitat ==
The genus × Haagespostoa grows endemically in Peru on mountainous slopes in rocky masses, in ravines (quebradas) and valleys, between 300 m and 1820 m in altitude. Populations are obviously rare and limited.

== Distribution ==
Peru (Ancash, Lambayeque, Lima)
