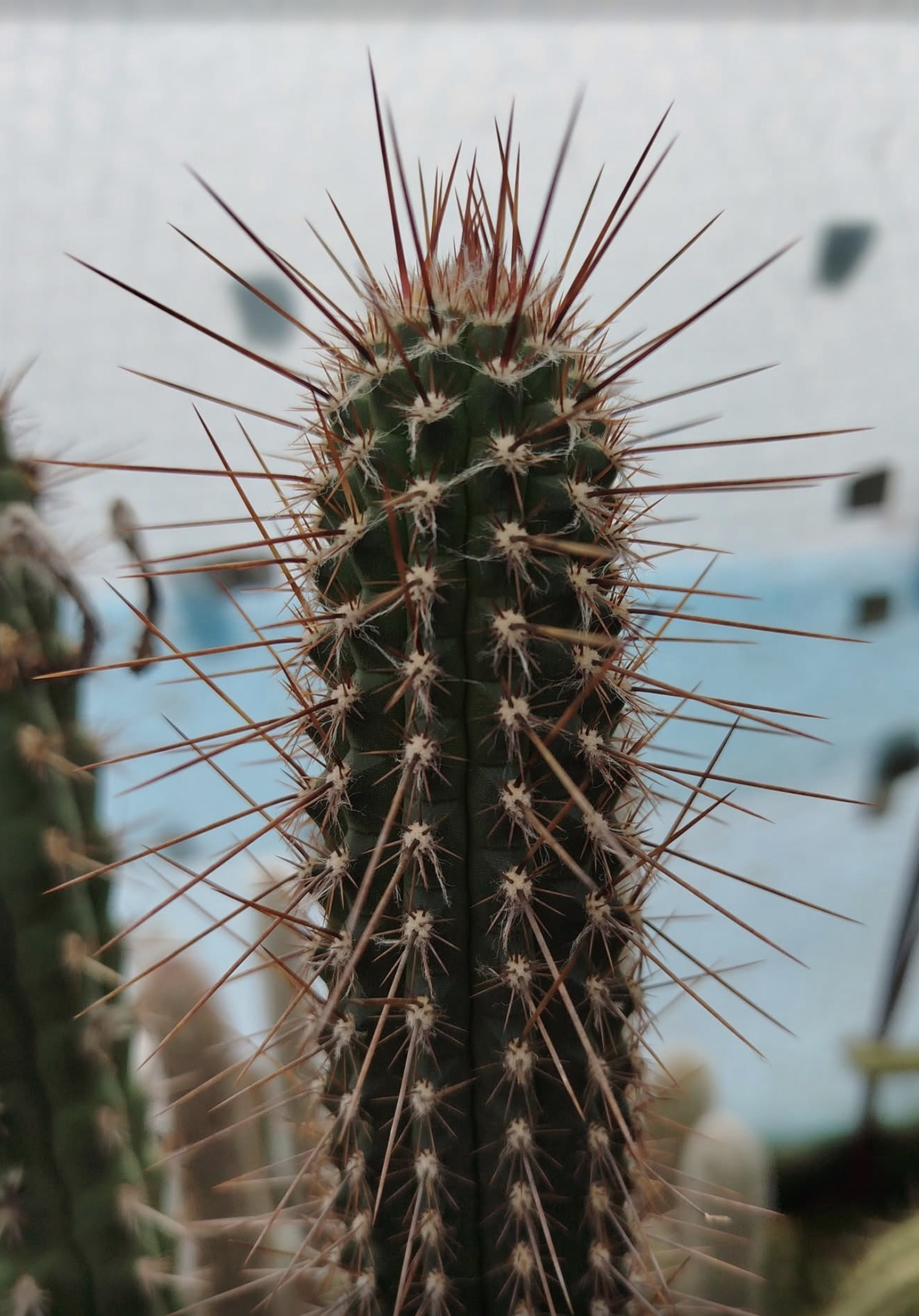

Scientific classification
- Kingdom: Plantae
- Clade: Tracheophytes
- Clade: Angiosperms
- Clade: Eudicots
- Order: Caryophyllales
- Family: Cactaceae
- Subfamily: Cactoideae
- Subtribe: Trichocereinae
- Genus: × Raustoa; M.H.J.van der Meer

Species
- None published, one nothospecies known: Rauhocereus riosaniensis × Espostoa superba

= × Raustoa =

Genus of cacti

× Raustoa is a nothogenus of cacti native to Peru with only one known species.

== Habitat ==
× Raustoa is found in Jaén, Peru, where Rauhocereus riosaniensis and Espostoa superba occur sympatrically.
