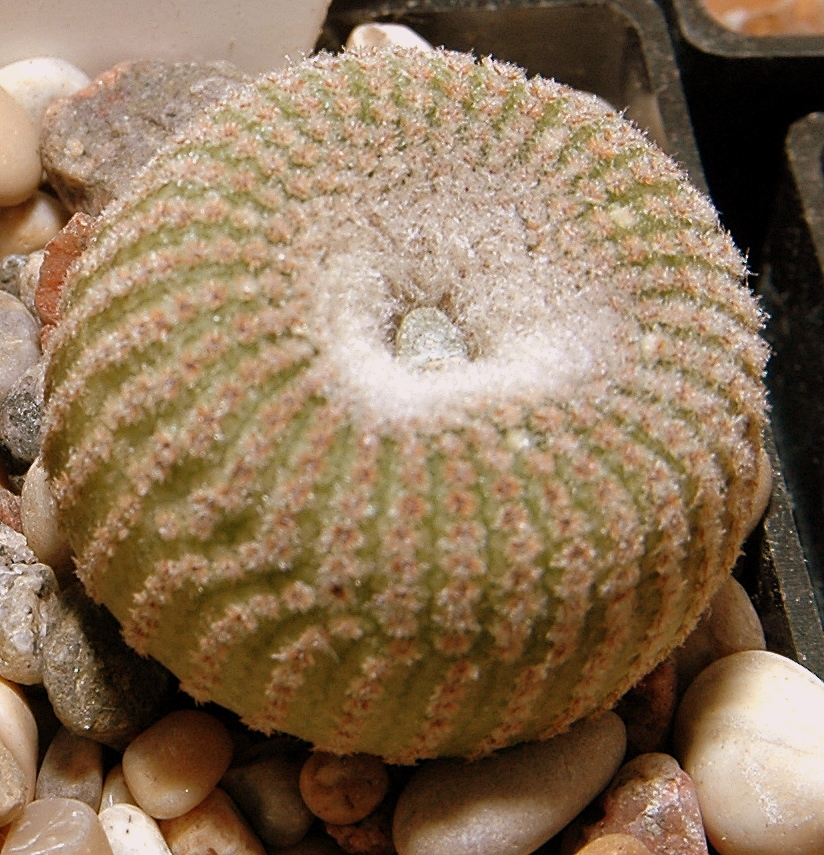

Conservation status
- Endangered (IUCN 3.1)

Scientific classification
- Kingdom: Plantae
- Clade: Tracheophytes
- Clade: Angiosperms
- Clade: Eudicots
- Order: Caryophyllales
- Family: Cactaceae
- Subfamily: Cactoideae
- Tribe: Notocacteae
- Genus: Yavia; R.Kiesling & Piltz
- Species: Y. cryptocarpa

Binomial name
- Yavia cryptocarpa R.Kiesling & Piltz

Synonyms
- Blossfeldia cryptocarpa (R.Kiesling & Piltz) Halda 2003

= Yavia =

Genus of cacti

Yavia cryptocarpa is a species of cactus (family Cactaceae) and the only species of the genus Yavia. The genus is named after Argentina's department Yavi, Jujuy Province, where the plant is endemic to sparsely vegetated rocky slopes. The plant is also sometimes put in the tribe Notocacteae. The specific epithet cryptocarpa refers to the plant being a cryptocarp. This means that the fruits are formed inside the plant's body and only visible when the plant shrinks in the drought period, in some specimens of this species don't shrinking isn't sufficient enough to expose the fruit (sometimes referred to as berries), So the seeds are released only after the plants death or damage to the plants body. Though this ocuers rarely in healthy specimens

== Description ==
The species, with very tuberous roots, has a subglobular stem, has a cylindrical to inverted cone-shaped, compressed at the apex and wider at the top than at the bottom, green plant body that reaches heights of between 0.5 and 1.5 cm (0.59 in) and a diameter of 1.3 to 2.5 cm (0.51 to 0.98 in) (rarely 3 cm (1.2 in)). Its general appearance is quite flattened and the upper part protrudes slightly from the ground. It measures from 3 to 4 cm (1.2 to 1.6 in) in height by about 2 to 3 cm (0.79 to 1.18 in) in width. The areoles are arranged on the tubers and have between 8 and 15 pectinated spines about 1 to 5 mm (0.039 to 0.197 in) long. From them arise 8 to 15 pink-colored thorns, which become glassy-white with age. The flowers are pale pink although they can be white or pale purple. They measure 1 cm (0.39 in) long by about 2 cm (0.79 in) wide. The flower cup, which is up to 5 mm (0.20 in) long and 2 mm (0.079 in) wide, is bare. Perianth is cone-shaped. The outer, olive petals are spatulate, 4 mm (0.16 in) long and 2.5 mm (0.098 in) wide. The inner, lanceolate, 6 to 7 mm (0.24 to 0.28 in) long and 3 to 4 mm (0.12 to 0.16 in) wide petals are white to pink with a whitish edge. Flowering is diurnal and occurs at the end of spring. The fruits are about 2 or 3 mm (0.12 in) wide and remain protected in the central depression of the plant for several months, being expelled at the end of spring of the following year, when the flower buds develop at the beginning of the rainy season.

The inverted cone-shaped, bare, small fruits are embedded in the apex depression and surrounded by the woolly felt of the young areoles. They contain few, dark brown and more or less oval seeds.

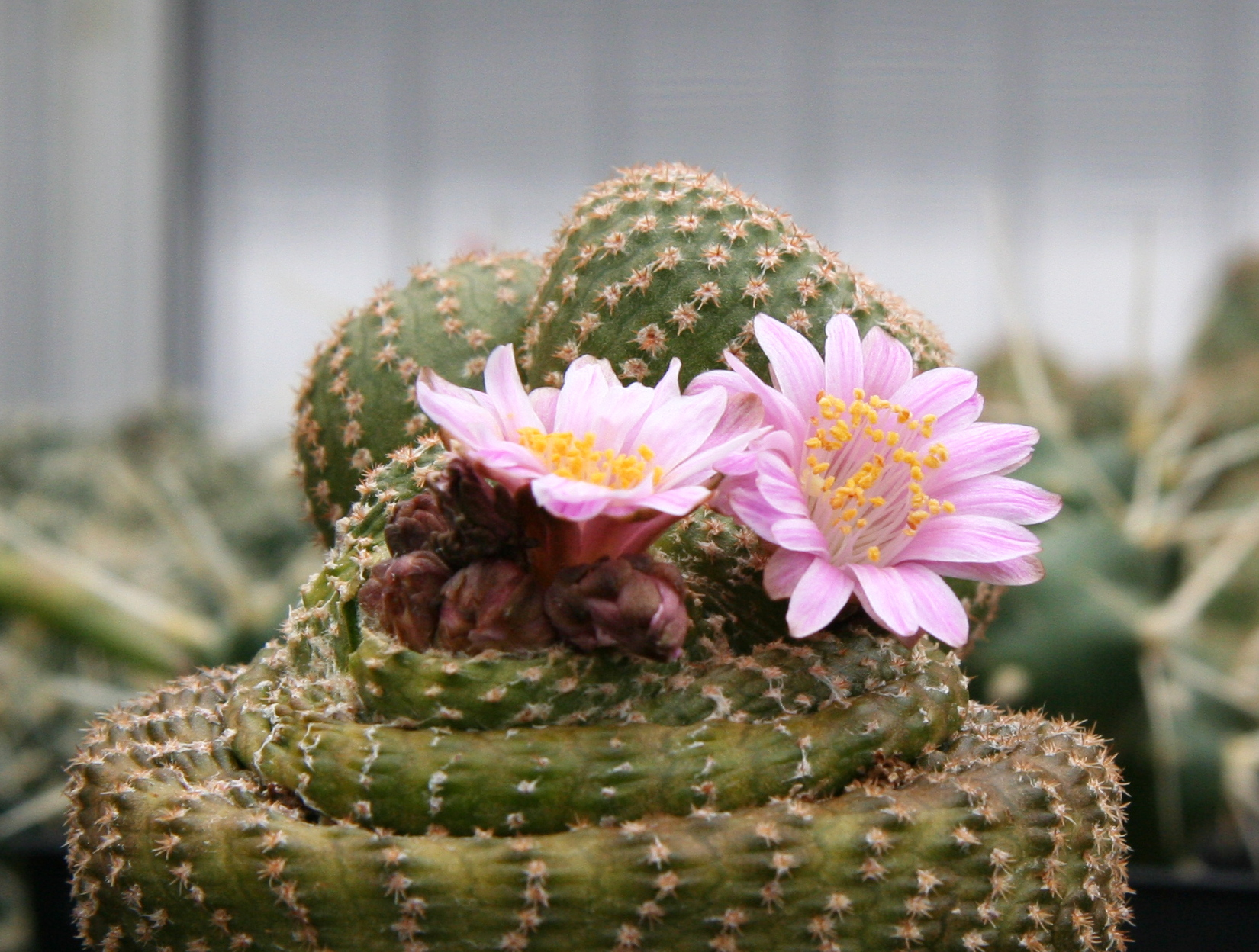
Flowers

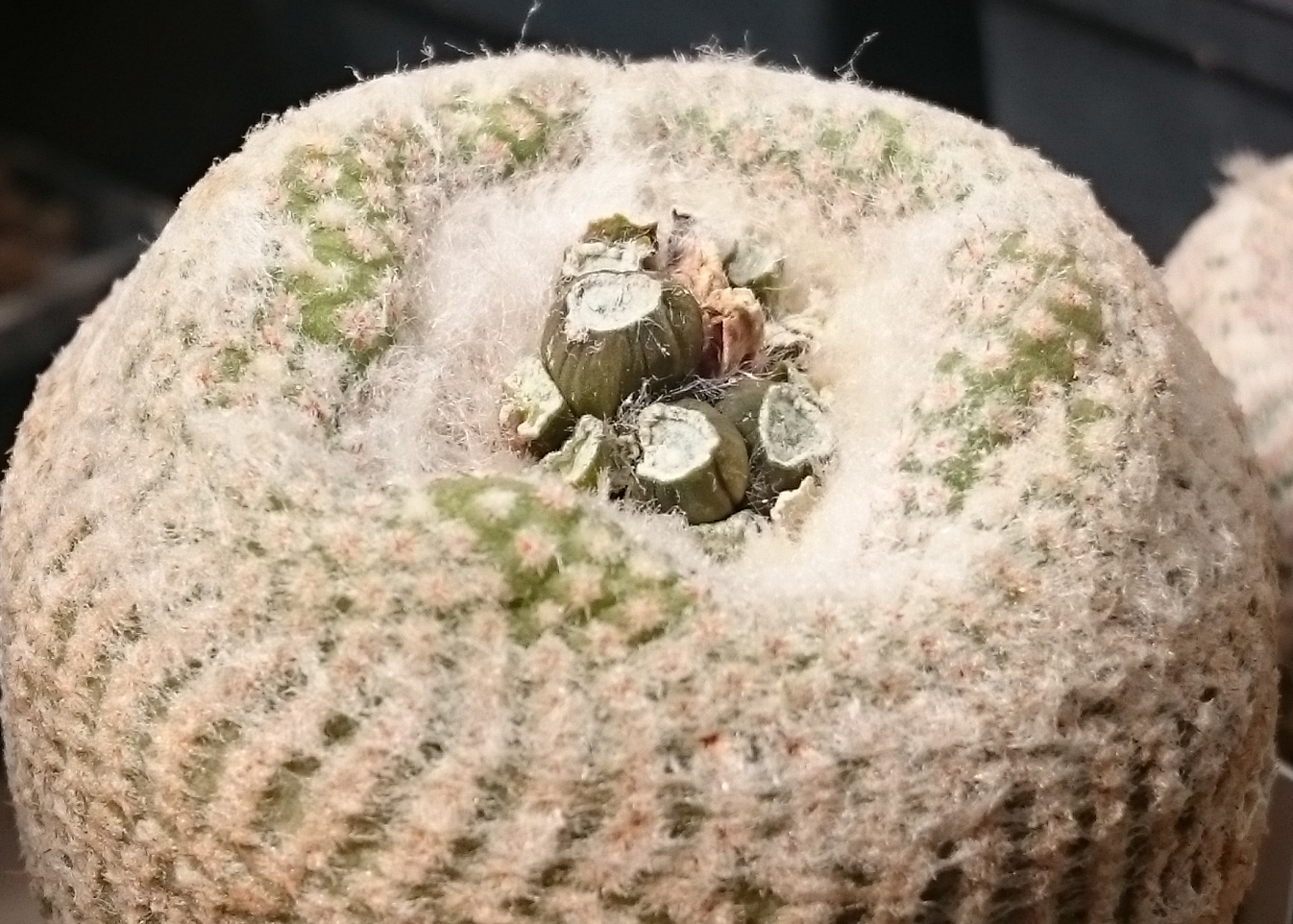
Fruits

== Distribution ==
Yavia cryptocarpa is widespread in the north of the Argentine province of Jujuy in the border area with Bolivia at altitudes of around 3700 meters.

== Taxonomy ==
The first specimens discovered by Roberto Kiesling in February 1986 were lost. Only until 2000 could new specimens be collected and cultivated. The first description, written together with Jörg Piltz, appeared in March 2001 in Cacti and Other Succulents, the magazine of the German Cactus Society.

A nomenclature synonym is Blossfeldia cryptocarpa (R.Kiesling & Piltz) Halda (2003).
