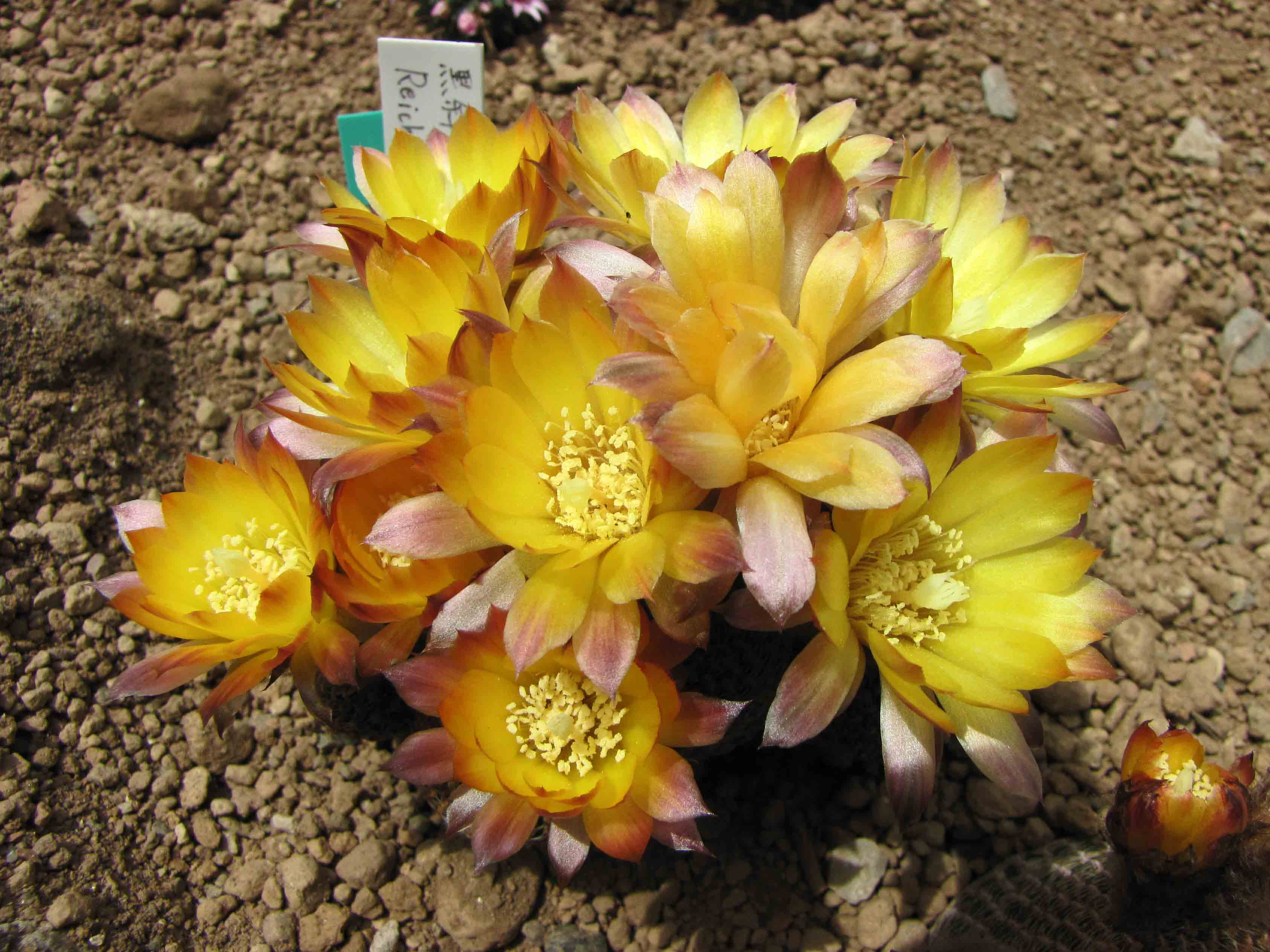

Conservation status
- Vulnerable (IUCN 3.1)

Scientific classification
- Kingdom: Plantae
- Clade: Tracheophytes
- Clade: Angiosperms
- Clade: Eudicots
- Order: Caryophyllales
- Family: Cactaceae
- Subfamily: Cactoideae
- Tribe: Cereeae
- Subtribe: Trichocereinae
- Genus: Reicheocactus; Backeb.
- Species: R. famatimensis

Binomial name
- Reicheocactus famatimensis (Speg.) Schlumpb.

Synonyms
- List: Echinocactus famatinensis Speg.; Echinopsis famatinensis (Speg.) Werderm.; Lobivia famatinensis (Speg.) Britton & Rose; Echinopsis bonnieae (Halda, Hogan & Janeba) Halda & Malina; Lobivia bonnieae Halda, Hogan & Janeba; Lobivia famatinensis var. aurantiaca Backeb., no Latin descr.; Lobivia famatinensis var. cinnabarina Backeb., no Latin descr.; Lobivia otukae Y.Itô; Lobivia otukae var. cinnabarina Y.Itô; Lobivia otukae var. croceantha Y.Itô; Reicheocactus bonnieae (Halda, Hogan & Janeba) Schlumpb.; Reicheocactus pseudoreicheanus Backeb.

= Reicheocactus =

Monotypic genus of cactus

Reicheocactus is a monotypic genus of cactus in the family Cactaceae, native to north western Argentina. It has only one known species, Reicheocactus famatimensis.

== Description ==
Reicheocactus famatinensis usually grows solitary and only occasionally forms cushions. The spherical to short cylindrical shoots reach heights of 3 to 7 cm (1.2 to 2.8 in) with diameters of 2.5 to 6 cm (0.98 to 2.36 in). The shoot apex is strongly sunken. There are 24 to 30 low ribs, which are divided into cusps. The brownish areoles on them are elongated. Central spines are not formed. The seven to nine whitish to yellowish marginal spines have a darker base. They are curved, rest on the surface of the shoot and are up to 0.3 cm (0.12 in) long. The short, funnel-shaped, yellow to orange flowers are 3 to 3.5 cm (1.2 to 1.4 in) long.

It is usually solitary or slowly clumping and slow growing. The stems are small flattened-roundish to cylindrical with very short spidery-pectinate spines and egg-yellow flowers.

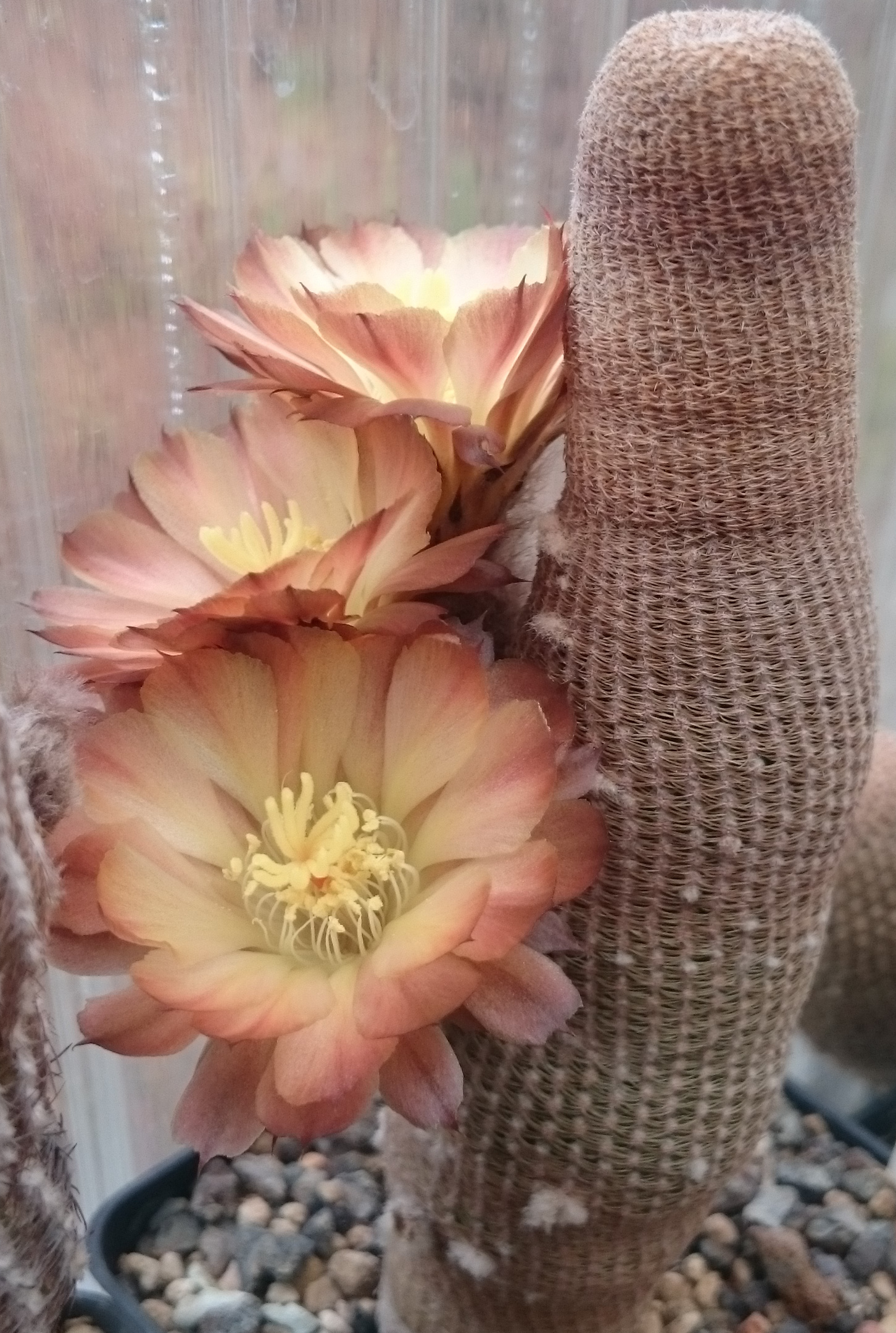
Reicheocactus famatimensis

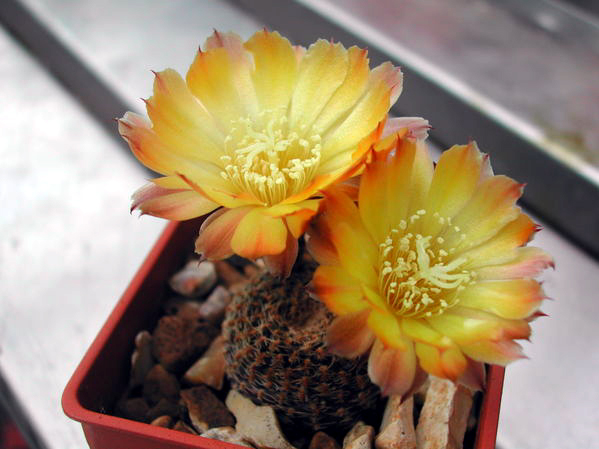
Flowers

== Taxonomy ==
The genus Reicheocactus was published in Cactaceae (Berlin) 1941(2) on page 76 (published in 1942), and the species was published in Cactaceae Syst. Init. vol.28 on page 30 in 2012.

It was once thought to be a synonym of Rebutia, and commonly found in cactus nurseries as Lobivia famatimensis.

The genus name of Reicheocactus is in honour of Karl Friedrich Reiche (1860–1929), who was a German botanist who worked as a university professor in Chile and Mexico. The Latin specific epithet of famatimensis is derived from Sierra de Famatina, a mountain range and massif in the Andes of the Argentine province of La Rioja.

== Distribution ==
The species grows at elevations of 1,000 to 3,000 m (3,300 to 9,800 ft) meters above sea level. It is found in high altitude grasslands on rocky soils. The species is not common or abundant, however it is difficult to see because of its small size. The major threat for the species is over collection (by plant collectors). The potential development of mining in its natural habitat could affect the populations of the species in the near future.

== Other sources ==
- Urs Eggli, Leonard E. Newton "Etymological Dictionary of Succulent Plant Names". Springer, Berlin/Heidelberg 2010
