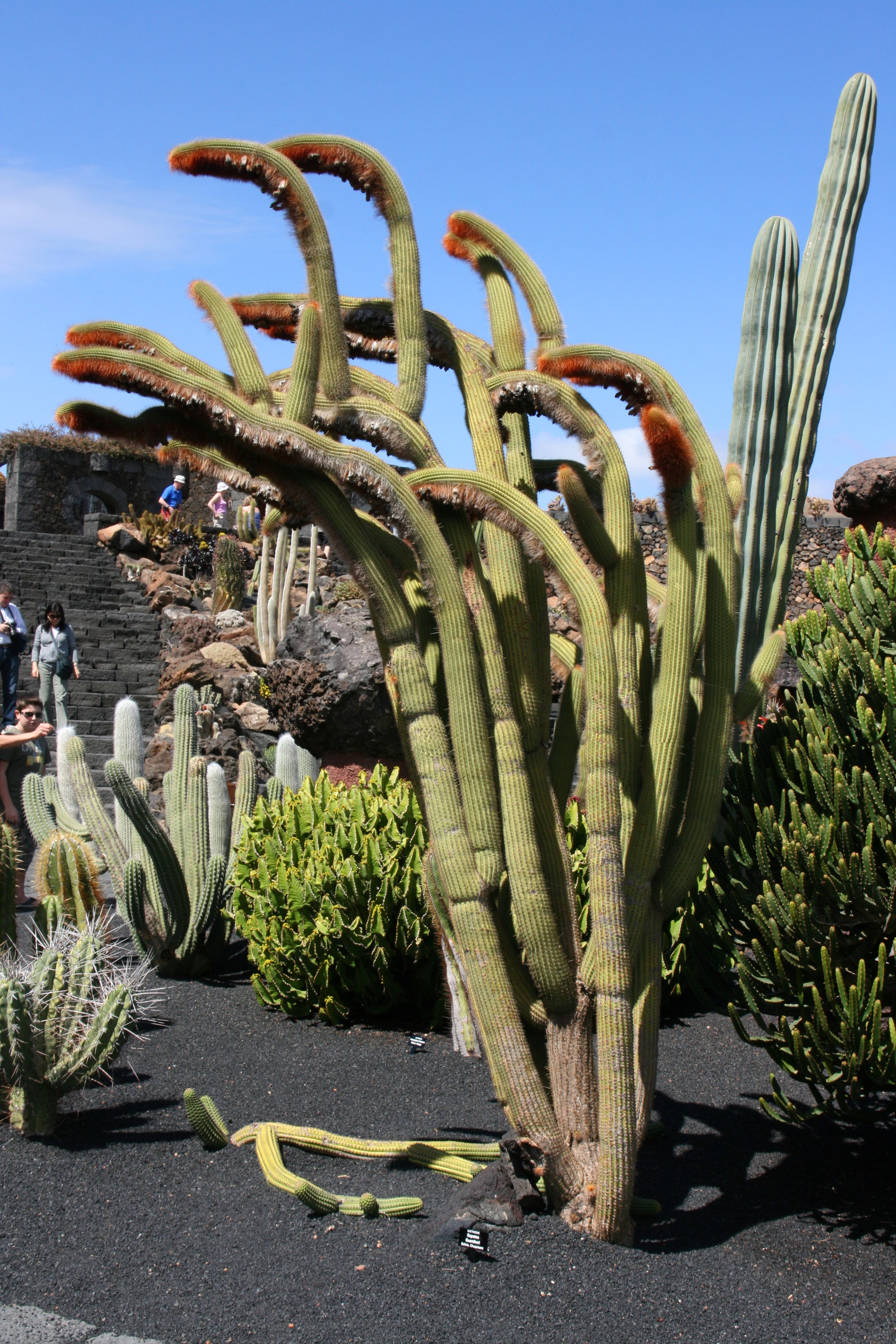
- In cultivation in the Jardin de Cactus, Lanzarote

Scientific classification
- Kingdom: Plantae
- Clade: Embryophytes
- Clade: Tracheophytes
- Clade: Spermatophytes
- Clade: Angiosperms
- Clade: Eudicots
- Order: Caryophyllales
- Family: Cactaceae
- Subfamily: Cactoideae
- Tribe: Cereeae
- Subtribe: Trichocereinae
- Genus: Vatricania; Backeb.
- Species: V. guentheri

Binomial name
- Vatricania guentheri (Kupper) Backeb.

Synonyms
- Cephalocereus guentheri Kupper; Cereus guentheri (Kupper) Werderm., nom. illeg.; Echinopsis guentheri (Kupper) Anceschi & Magli; Espostoa guentheri (Kupper) Buxb. ex Eggli

= Vatricania =

Species of flowering plant

Vatricania is a monotypic genus of flowering plants belonging to the family Cactaceae. It contains just one species, Vatricania guentheri. It has the common name of red tail cactus.

Its native range is Bolivia. It is found in dry forest vegetation or covering hillsides, at altitudes of 800–1,300 metres (2,600–4,300 ft) metres above sea level.

== Description ==
Vatricania guentheri is an evergreen, perennial columnar cactus. It can grow up to 2 m (6 ft 7 in) tall. Branching occurs from the base, with pale green stems up to 10 cm (4 in) in diameter. It has about 27 ribs. The flowers are initially borne in a cephalium (reddish brown wool,) running down from the crown (top of the plant) on one side, of the branches, later in a superficial dome cephalium. It blooms during the early summer and develops yellowish whitish flowers that get up to 8 cm long and 5–3 cm (2–1 in) in diameter. The flowers are yellowish white areoles or funnel shaped flowers, with 25 spines, 5–22 mm (0–1 in) long. It has edible fruit.

== Taxonomy ==
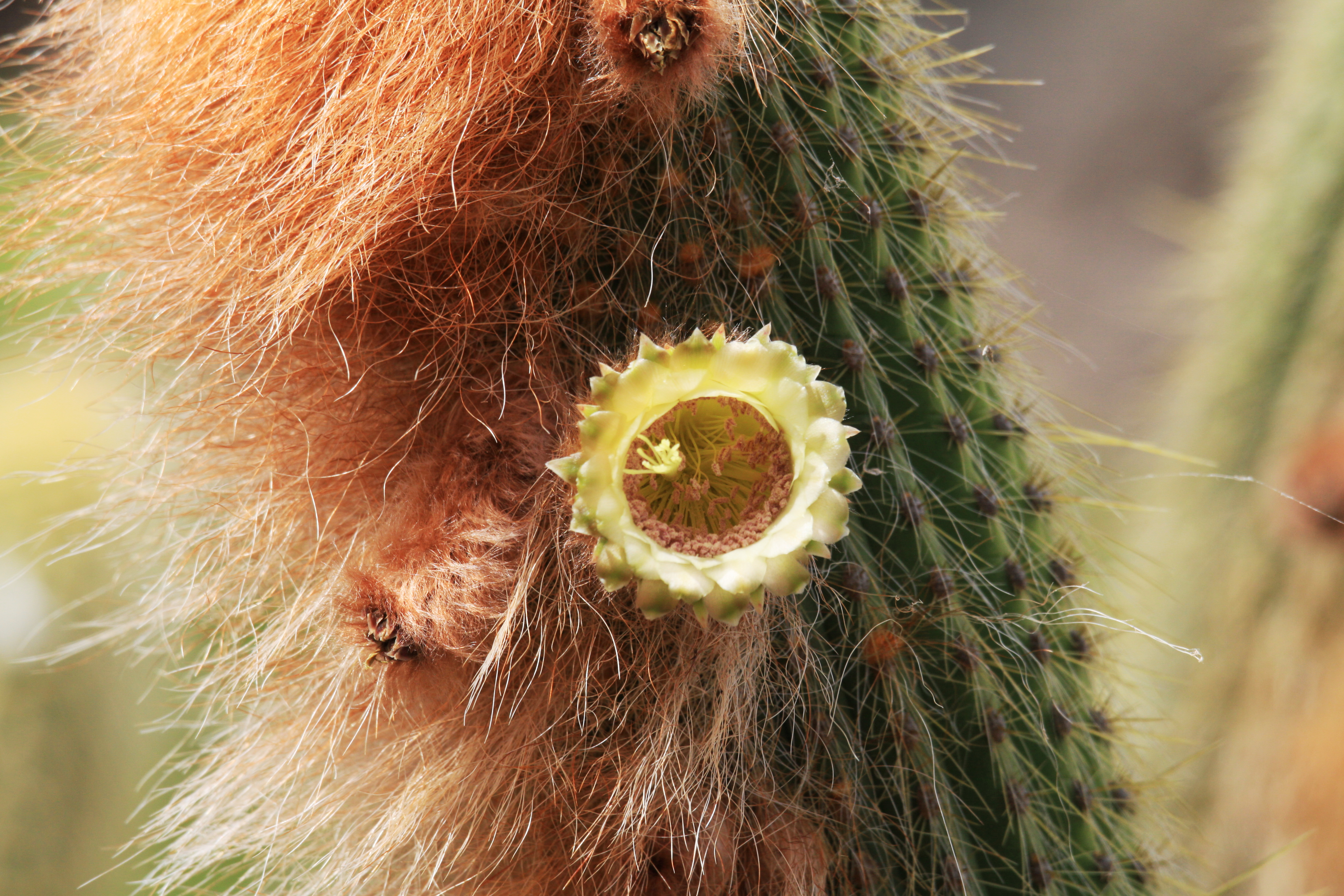
Flower of the plant

The genus was first described and published in 1950 by Curt Backeberg. The genus name Vatricania is in honour of Louis Félix Vatrican (1904–2007), an agricultural engineer from Monaco, director of the national Jardin Exotique. The genus is placed in the tribe Trichocereinae.

In publishing the genus name, Backeberg designated Cephalocereus guentheri as the type species, although he did not actually use the combination Vatricania guentheri, which he published in 1951. Cephalocereus guentheri was first described by Kupper in 1931. The Latin specific epithet guentheri refers to Ernesto Günther of Valparaíso, Chile, who financed the expedition in Bolivia during which Carl Troll discovered the species. Kupper originally spelled the epithet Güntheri.

The species was lumped into Espostoa in 1959. A hybrid origin was suggested as there are differences from Espostoa. Molecular evidence suggests that Espostoa is not the correct placement for this species.

== Cultivation ==
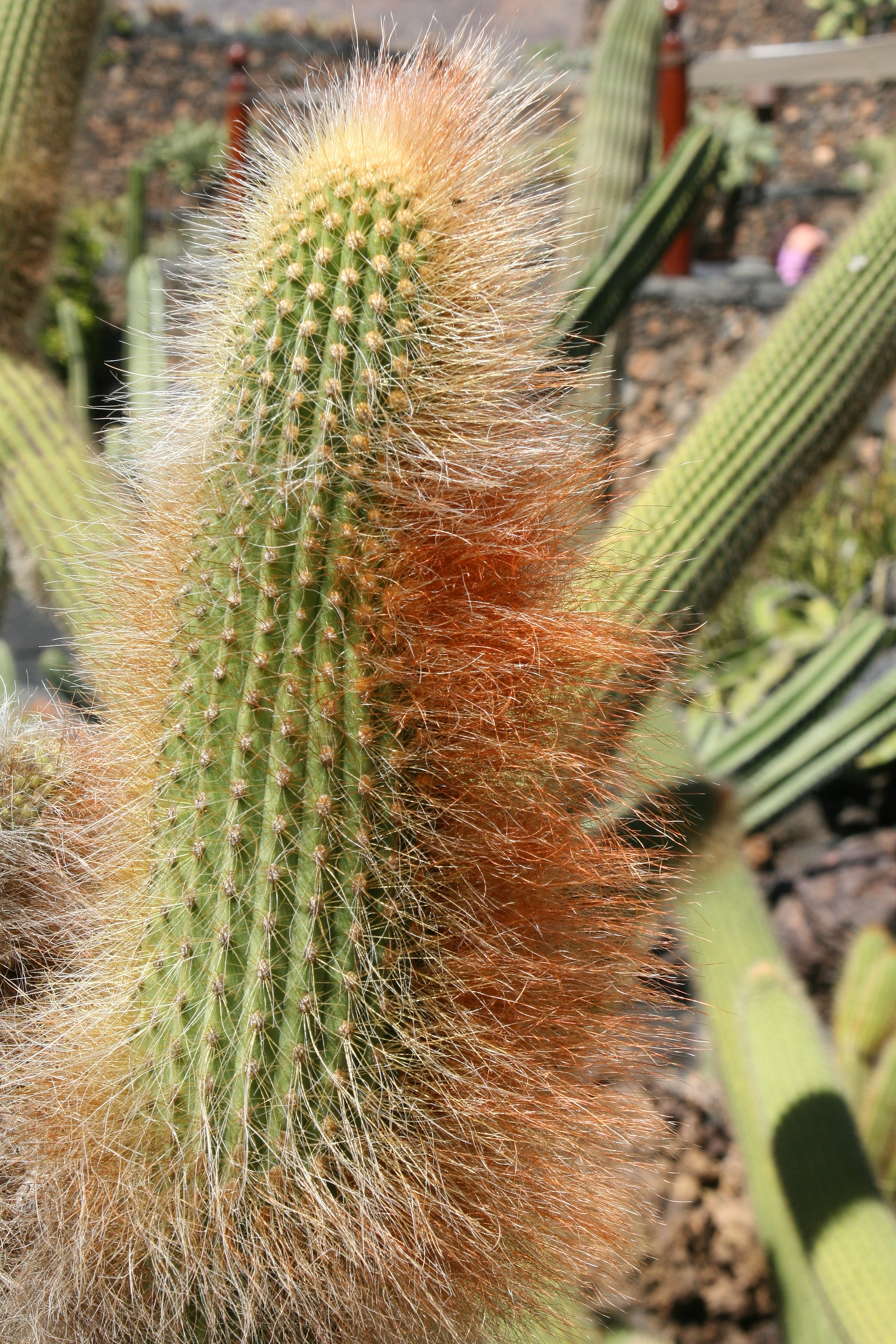
Cephalium

Can be grown in the USA, in Zone USDA: 9b-11. It can survive a minimum average temperature of 55°F (12°C) and can tolerate positions in full sun.
