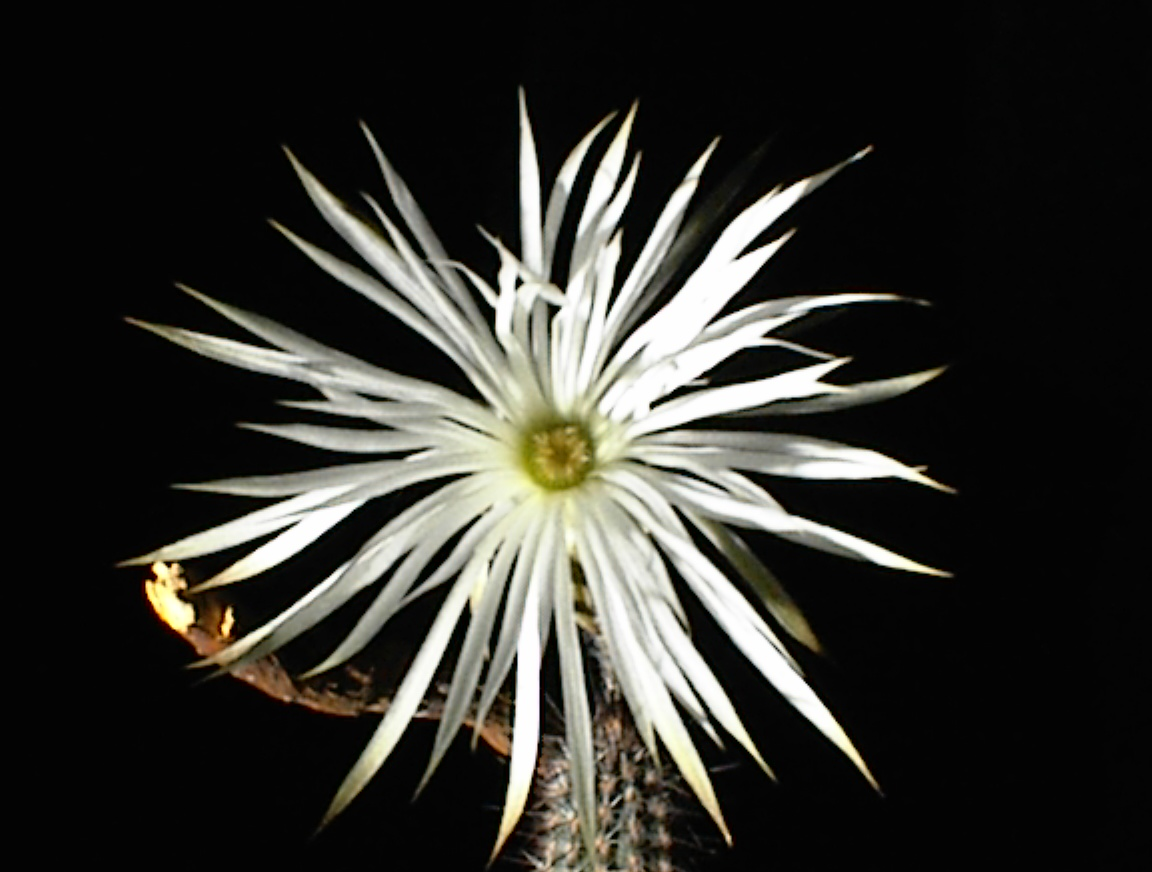

Conservation status
- Least Concern (IUCN 3.1)

Scientific classification
- Kingdom: Plantae
- Clade: Tracheophytes
- Clade: Angiosperms
- Clade: Eudicots
- Order: Caryophyllales
- Family: Cactaceae
- Subfamily: Cactoideae
- Tribe: Cereeae
- Subtribe: Trichocereinae
- Genus: Setiechinopsis; Backeb. ex de Haas
- Species: S. mirabilis

Binomial name
- Setiechinopsis mirabilis (Speg.) Backeb. ex de Haas

Synonyms
- Of Setiechinopsis: Acanthopetalus Y.Itô; Of Setiechinopsis mirabilis: Acanthopetalus mirabilis (Speg.) Y.Itô; Arthrocereus mirabilis (Speg.) W.T.Marshall; Echinopsis mirabilis Speg.

= Setiechinopsis =

Species of cactus

Setiechinopsis is a monotypic genus of cacti. Its only species, Setiechinopsis mirabilis, is native to Argentina.

== Description ==
Setiechinopsis mirabilis grows solitary. The cylindrical, dull yellowish-green to brown-green shoots reach heights of 12 to 15 cm (4.7 to 5.9 in) with a diameter of up to 2 cm (0.79 in). There are eleven ribs that are slightly wavy. The single, protruding and straight central spine is 1 to 1.5 cm (0.39 to 0.59 in) long. The nine to 14 radial spines are slender and straight.

The narrow, tubular, white flowers appear near the tips of the shoots and are rather unpleasantly scented. They are 11 to 12 cm (4.3 to 4.7 in) long. Their bracts are spread out. The fruits reach a diameter of 0.6 to 1 cm (0.24 to 0.39 in) and are 3.5 to 4 cm (1.4 to 1.6 in) long.

== Taxonomy ==
The first description of the species as Echinopsis mirabilis by Carlos Luis Spegazzini was published in 1905. The specific epithet mirabilis comes from Latin, means 'wonderful' and refers to the appearance of the species. De Haas placed the species in the genus Setiechinopsis in 1940.

== Distribution ==
Setiechinopsis mirabilis is distributed among lowland shrubs at 500 to 1000 meters in the Argentine provinces of Santiago del Estero, San Juan, La Rioja and Mendoza.
