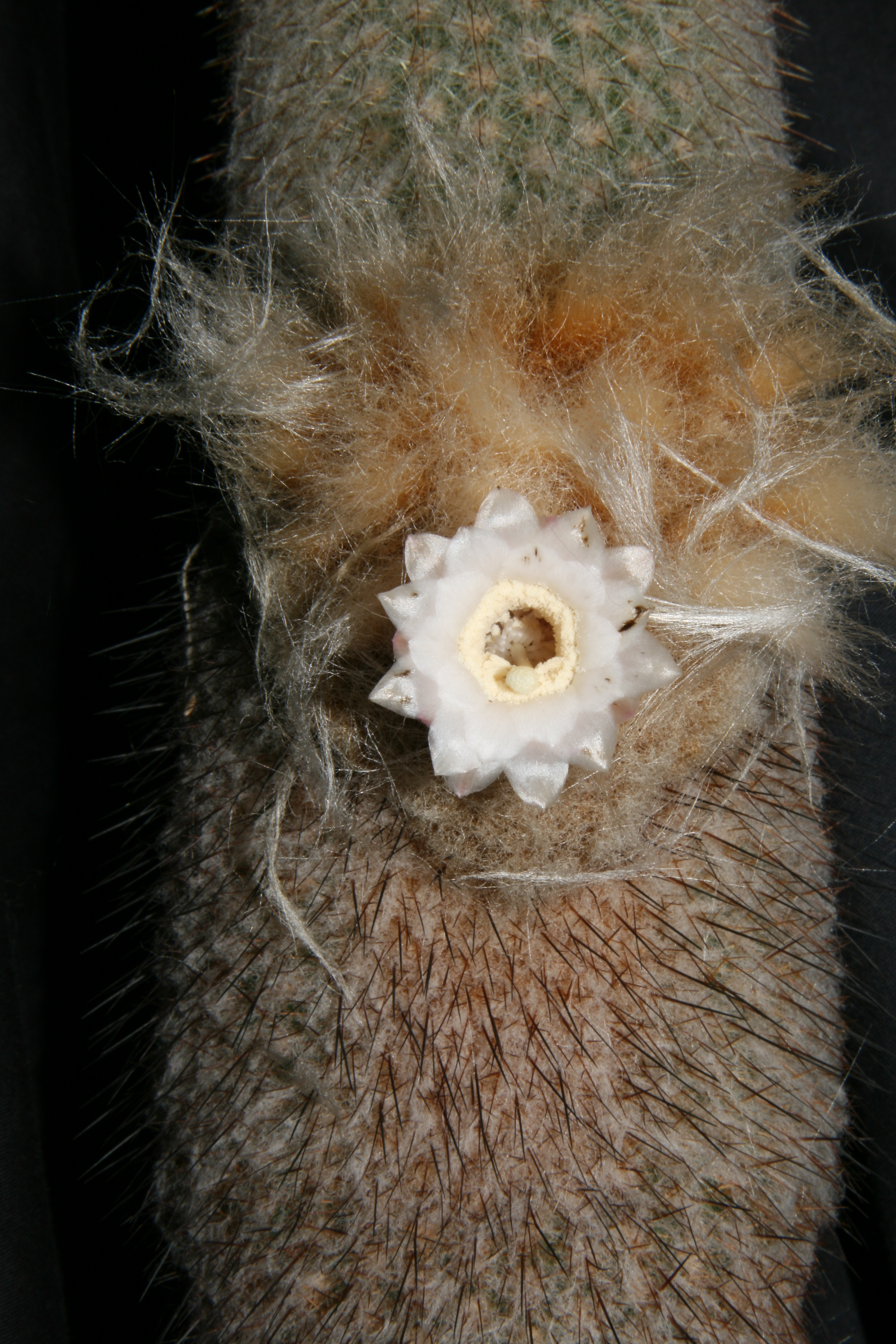

Conservation status
- Vulnerable (IUCN 3.1)

Scientific classification
- Kingdom: Plantae
- Clade: Embryophytes
- Clade: Tracheophytes
- Clade: Angiosperms
- Clade: Eudicots
- Order: Caryophyllales
- Family: Cactaceae
- Subfamily: Cactoideae
- Tribe: Cereeae
- Subtribe: Cereinae
- Genus: Espostoopsis; Buxb.
- Species: E. dybowskii

Binomial name
- Espostoopsis dybowskii (Rol.-Goss.) Buxb.

Synonyms
- Of the genus: Gerocephalus F.Ritter; Of the species: Austrocephalocereus dyhowskii (Rol.-Goss.) Backeb.; Cephalocereus dybowskii (Rol.-Goss.) Britton & Rose; Cereus dybowskii Rol.-Goss.; Coleocephalocereus dybowskii (Rol.-Goss.) F.H.Brandt; Gerocephalus dybowskii (Rol.-Goss.) F.Ritter

= Espostoopsis =

Genus of cacti

Espostoopsis is a monotypic genus of cactus containing the single species Espostoopsis dybowskii. The generic name is formed from Greek opsis meaning "view", referring to its resemblance to the genus Espostoa, with which it is often confused. The plant is only known from northern Bahia, Brazil.

== Description ==
Espostoopsis dybowskii grows shrubby and branches from the ground, reaches heights 2 to 4 meters. Their cylindrical trunks have 20 to 28 ribs, reaches up to a diameter of 8 centimeters and completely covered by white hairs. The areoles are covered with dull, yellowish wool and abundant white hairs. The 2 to 3 protruding, needle-like central spines are yellow and 2 to 3 centimeters long. The numerous, short and thin radial spines are hidden in the hairs of the areoles. The cephalium arises laterally and has a length of up to 60 centimeters.

The flowers are white and short tubular to bell-shaped, open at night and are up to 4 centimeters long. The flower tube covered with very small scales. The fruits are almost glabrose, pink fruits with persistent, blackening flower remains are broadly ovate in shape and have a diameter of up to 2.5 centimeters. Fruits contain white flesh and do not tear open. The black, rough-warty seeds are oval to pear-shaped.

== Taxonomy ==
The genus was first described in 1968 by Franz Buxbaum. The specific epithet dybowskii honors the botanist and agricultural scientist Jean Dybowski. Its only species was first described in 1909 as Cereus dybowskii by Robert Roland-Gosselin. Further nomenclature synonym are Cephalocereus dybowskii (Rol.-Goss.) Britton & Rose (1920), Austrocephalocereus dybowskii (Rol.-Goss.) Backeb. (1951), Austrocephalocereus dyhowskii (Rol.-Goss.) Backeb. (1951), Gerocephalus dybowskii (Rol.-Goss.) F.Ritter (1968) and Coleocephalocereus dybowskii (Rol.-Goss.) F.H.Brandt (1981).

The genus was formerly placed in subtribe Trichocereinae, but a 2023 molecular phylogenetic study found that it belonged to subtribe Cereinae.

== Distribution and habitat ==
Espostoopsis dybowskii is found growing in granite and quartz outcrops in northern Bahia, Brazil at altitudes of 300 to 750 meters.
