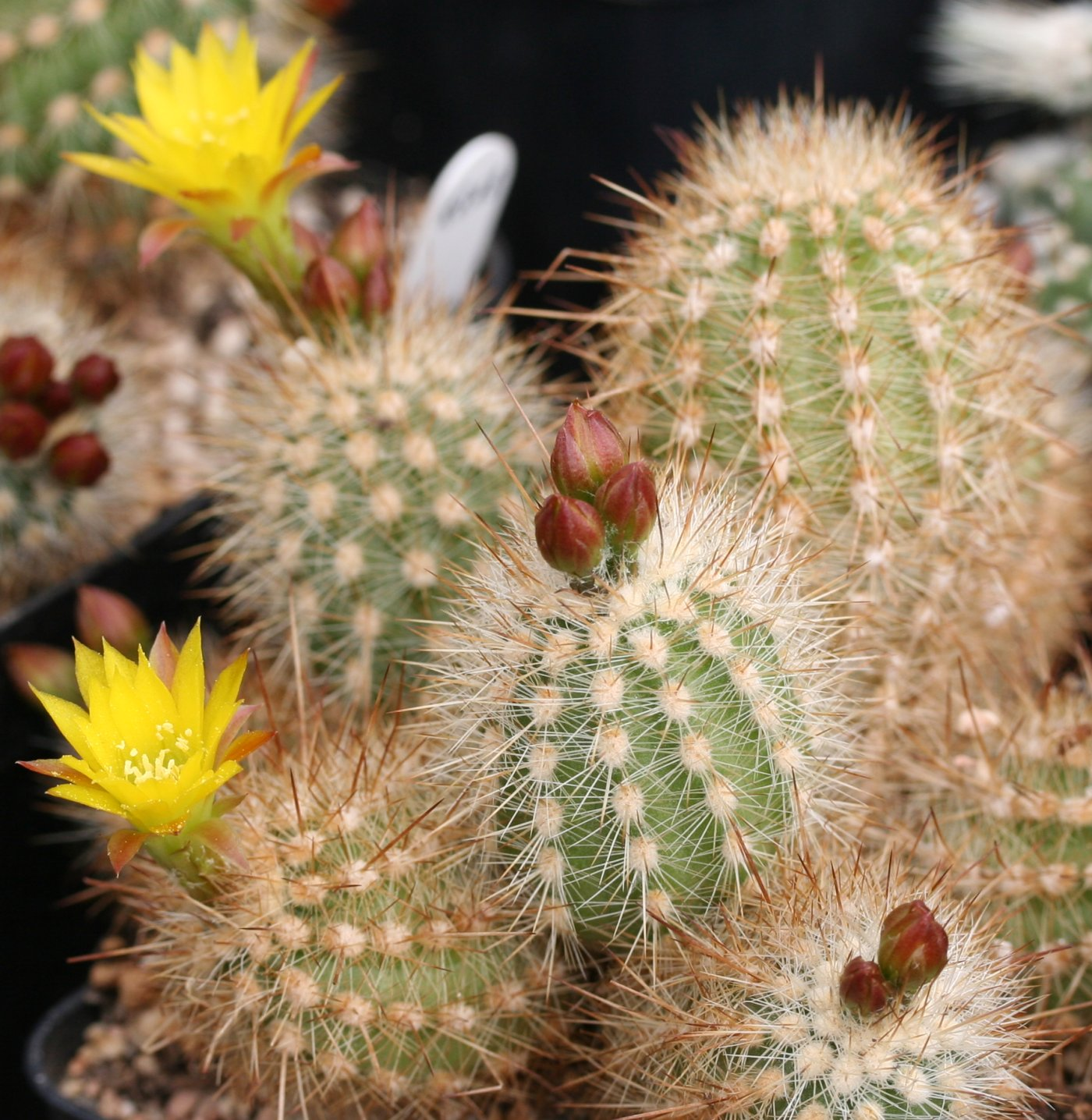

Conservation status
- Vulnerable (IUCN 3.1)

Scientific classification
- Kingdom: Plantae
- Clade: Tracheophytes
- Clade: Angiosperms
- Clade: Eudicots
- Order: Caryophyllales
- Family: Cactaceae
- Subfamily: Cactoideae
- Tribe: Cereeae
- Subtribe: Trichocereinae
- Genus: Mila; Britton & Rose
- Species: M. caespitosa

Binomial name
- Mila caespitosa Britton & Rose

Subspecies
- See text.

Synonyms
- Of the species: Echinopsis maytana Molinari; Of M. caespitosa subsp. caespitosa: Mila breviseta Rauh & Backeb.; Mila caespitosa subsp. densiseta (Rauh & Backeb.) Ostolaza; Mila caespitosa subsp. fortalezensis (Rauh & Backeb.) Ostolaza; Mila caespitosa subsp. nealeana (Backeb.) Donald; Mila cereoides Rauh & Backeb.; Mila colorea F.Ritter; Mila densiseta Rauh & Backeb.; Mila fortalezensis Rauh & Backeb.; Mila kubeana Werderm. & Backeb.; Mila kubei Backeb.; Mila lurinensis Rauh & Backeb.; Mila nealeana Backeb.; Mila sublanata Rauh & Backeb.; Of M. caespitosa subsp. pugionifera: Mila albisaetacens Rauh & Backeb.; Mila pugionifera Rauh & Backeb.

= Mila caespitosa =

Species of plant

Mila caespitosa is a species of cacti (family Cactaceae) and the only species of the genus Mila. Its generic name is an anagram of Lima, Peru, the city near which the plant is found. The genus was first thought to comprise 13 species, until recent studies suggest they form one very variable species.

== Description ==
The genus includes cacti that remain small, grow like a cereus, and sometimes sprout. The cacti with cylindrical, prostrate stems, about 30 cm long by 4 cm in diameter, they grow forming colonies. It has numerous low ribs covered with spines. The flowers are diurnal yellow. The fruits are small, globular, naked, green or reddish and juicy. The thorns are strong, stiff to soft and sometimes turn into hair bristles. The short-tubed flowers appear at the top, are funnel-shaped and usually yellow to whitish. The fruits are small, juicy and thornless berries.

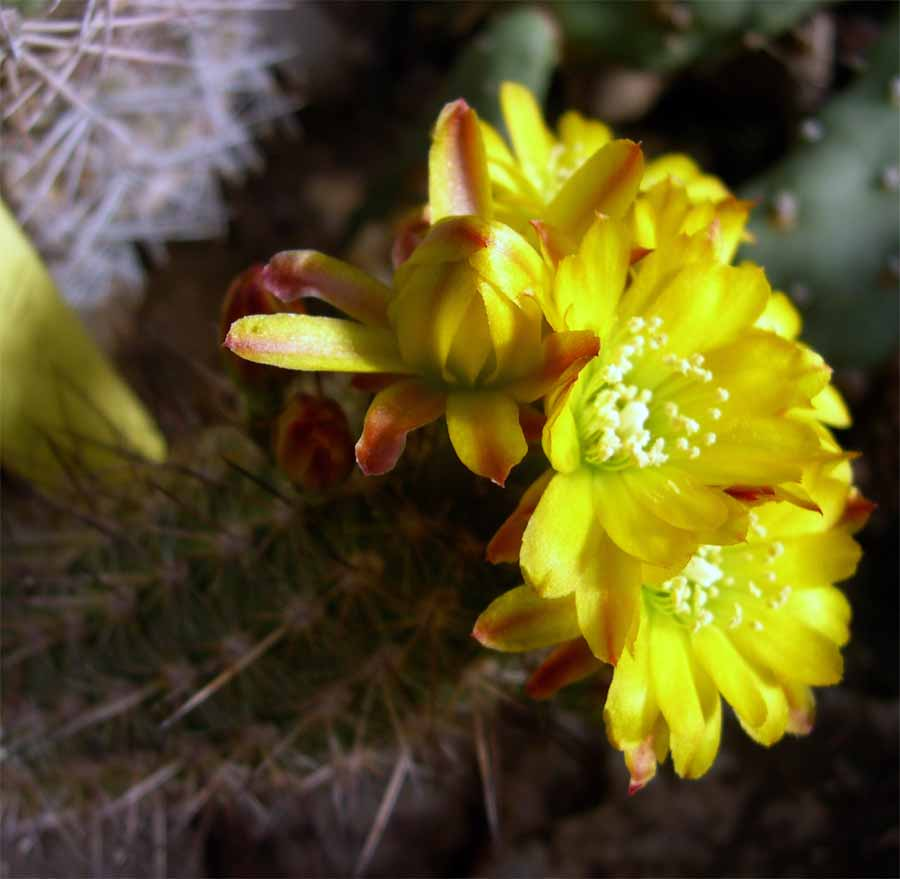
Flowers

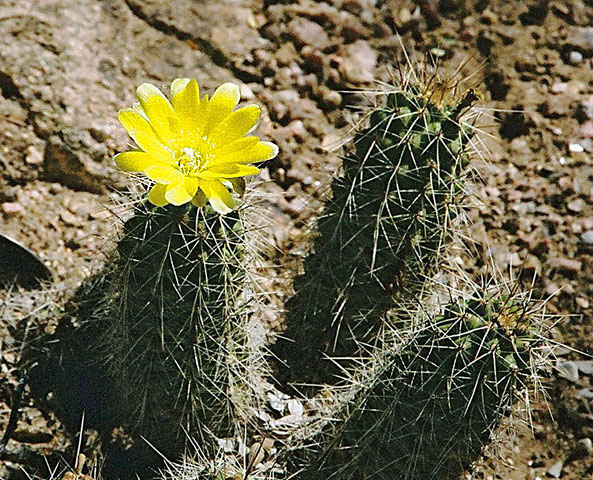
Plants

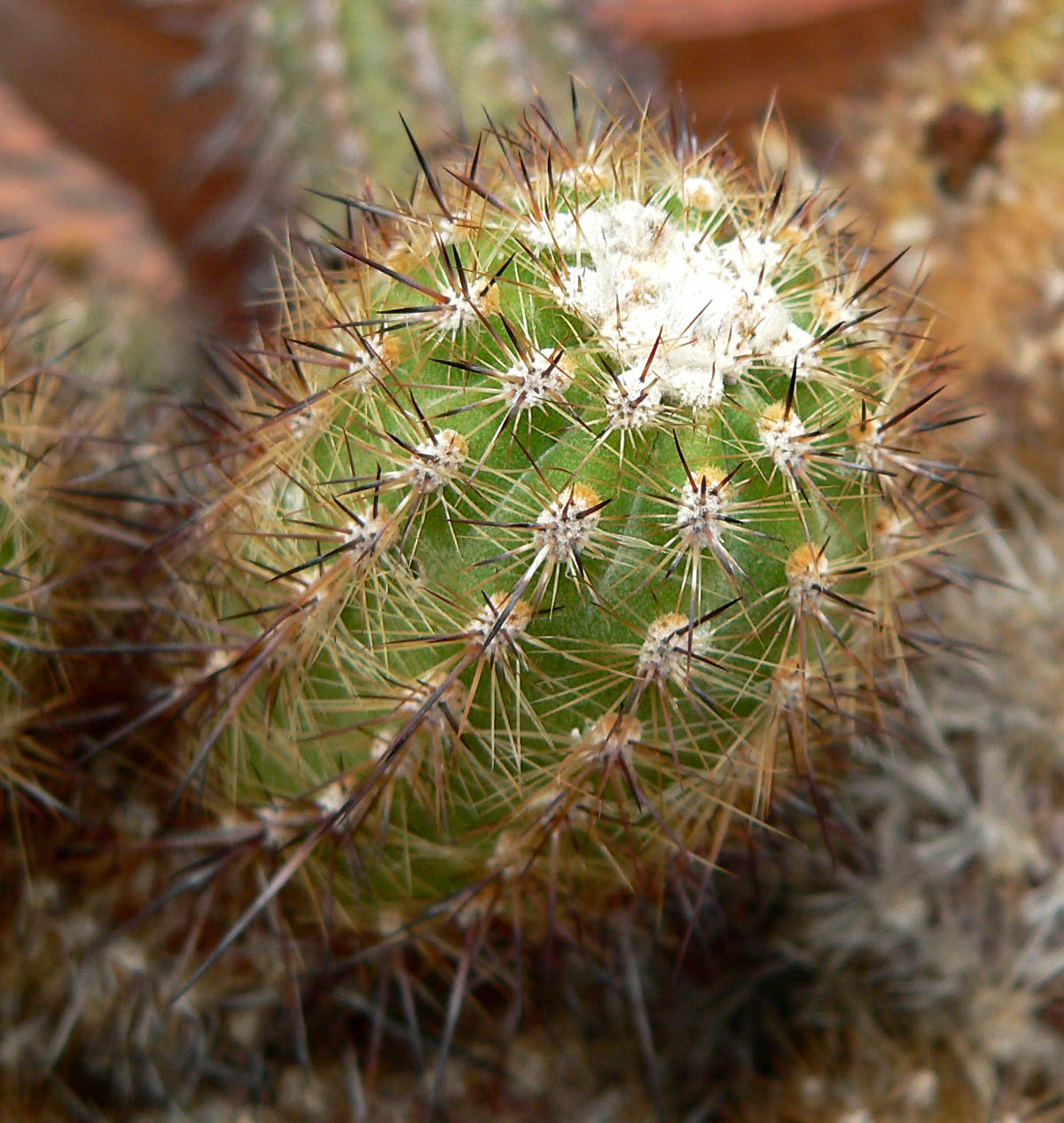
Spine

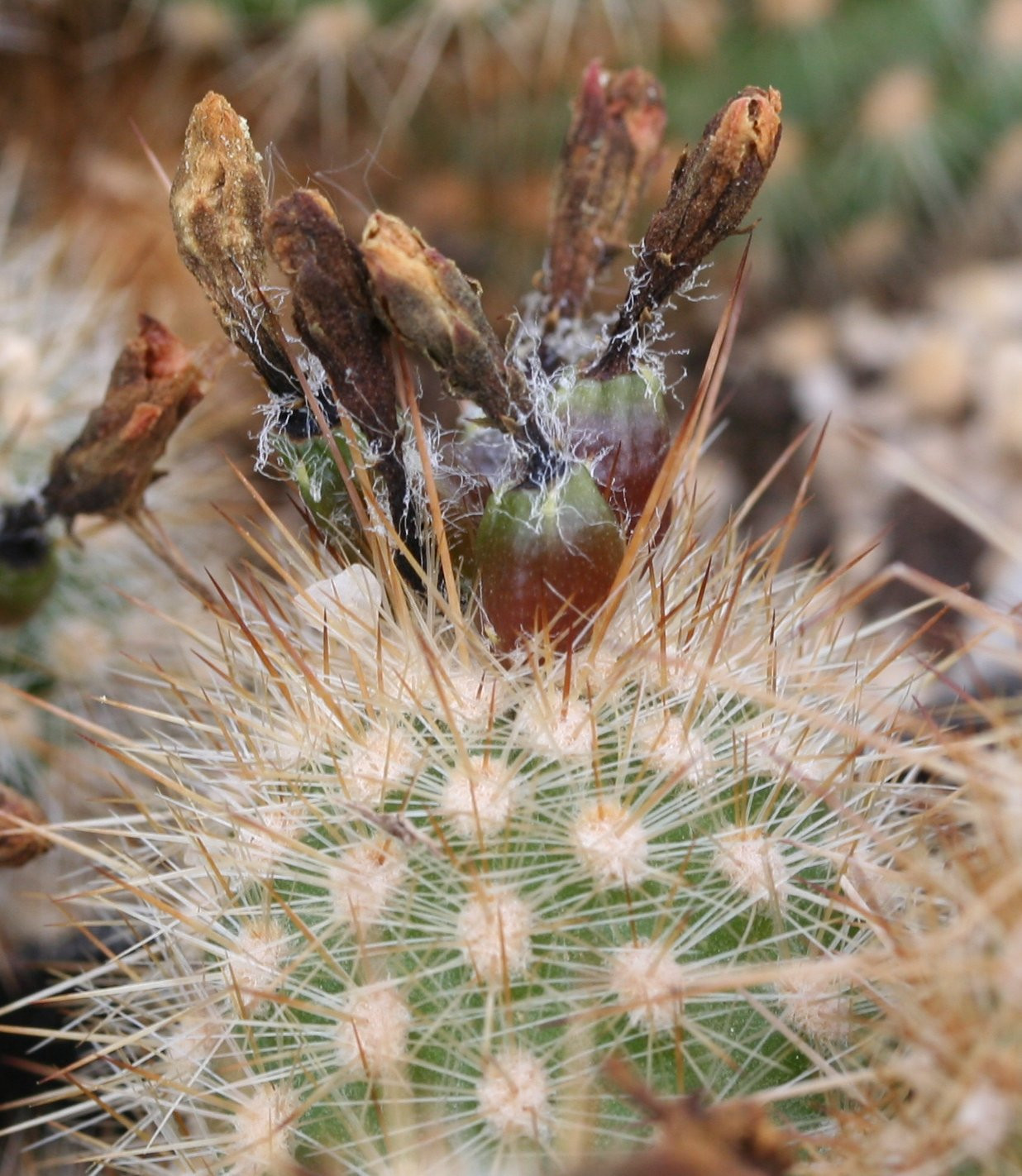
Fruits

== Taxonomy ==
The first description of the genus Mila with the single species Mila caespitosa was published in 1922 by Nathaniel Lord Britton and Joseph Nelson Rose. The genus name is an anagram of Lima, the capital of Peru. The specific epithet caespitosa comes from Latin, means tufted and refers to the growth habit of the species.

The history of the genus is characterized by a large number of first descriptions of supposedly independent species. The reason for this lies in the great variability of the species. In Walther Haage's work, 11 species and several subspecies are listed. David Hunt has 4 species. In recent literature, the genus is considered monotypic with only one species, Mila caespitosa. This classification is supported by molecular biological studies.

=== Subspecies ===
As of October 2023, Plants of the World Online accepted two subspecies:

- Mila caespitosa subsp. caespitosa
- Mila caespitosa subsp. pugionifera (Rauh & Backeb.) D.R.Hunt

== Distribution ==
The species ranges across the western Andes in Peru at an altitude of 1000 to 2500 m.
