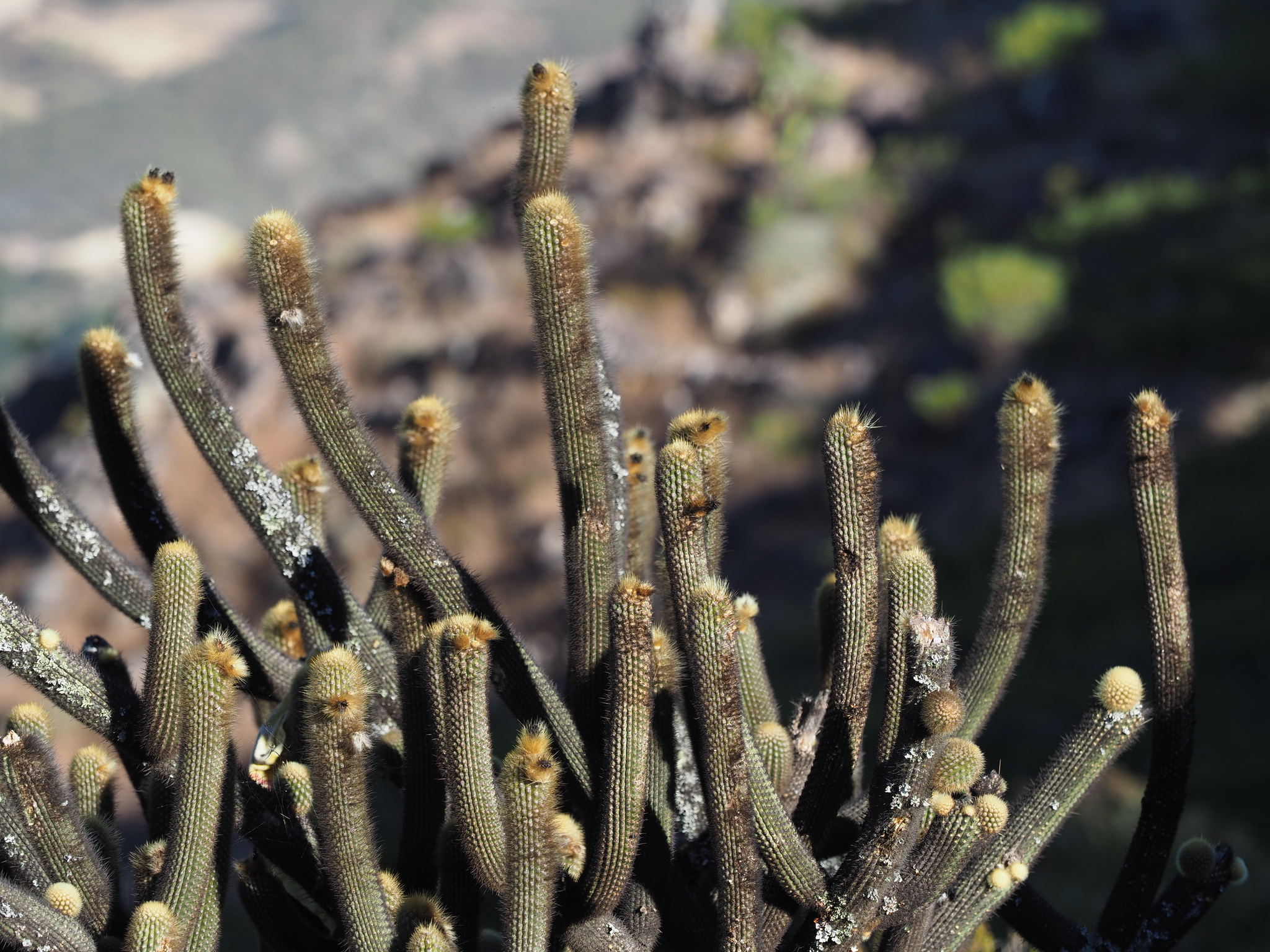
- Lasiocereus rupicola

Scientific classification
- Kingdom: Plantae
- Clade: Tracheophytes
- Clade: Angiosperms
- Clade: Eudicots
- Order: Caryophyllales
- Family: Cactaceae
- Subfamily: Cactoideae
- Tribe: Cereeae
- Subtribe: Trichocereinae (?)
- Genus: Lasiocereus; F.Ritter

Species
- See text.

= Lasiocereus =

Genus of cactus found in Peru

Lasiocereus is a genus of flowering plants in the family Cactaceae, native to Peru. The genus was established by Friedrich Ritter in 1966. It was formerly placed in subtribe Rebutiinae, but a 2023 molecular phylogenetic study suggested that it probably belonged to the subtribe Trichocereinae.

== Species ==
As of August 2023, Plants of the World Online accepted the following species:

- Lasiocereus fulvus F.Ritter
- Lasiocereus rupicola F.Ritter
