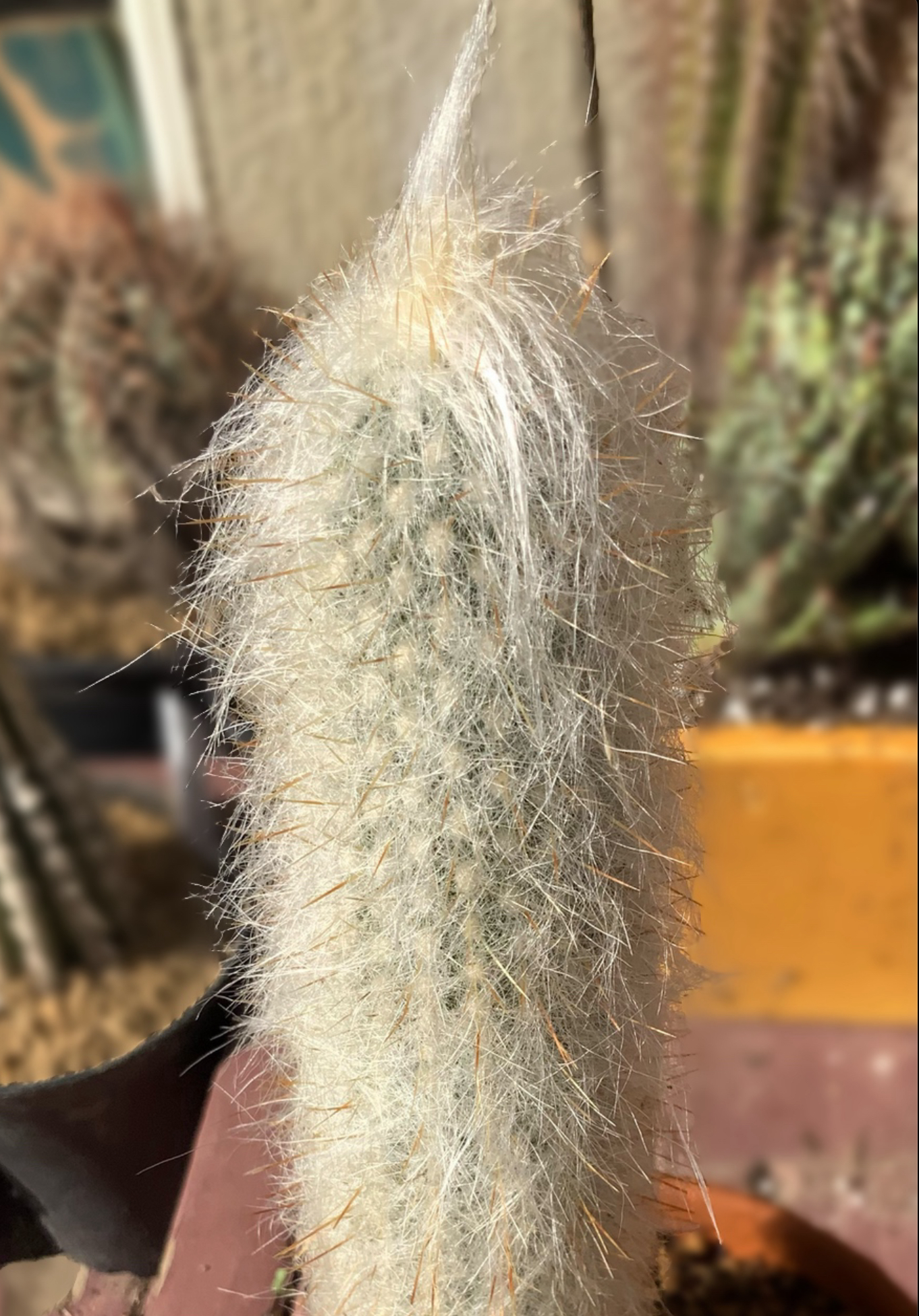
- 4 year old seedling of Cremnocereus

Scientific classification
- Kingdom: Plantae
- Clade: Tracheophytes
- Clade: Angiosperms
- Clade: Eudicots
- Order: Caryophyllales
- Family: Cactaceae
- Genus: Cremnocereus; M.Lowry, Winberg & Gut.Romero
- Species: C. albipilosus

Binomial name
- Cremnocereus albipilosus M.Lowry & Winberg

= Cremnocereus =

Genus of flowering plants

Cremnocereus is a monotypic genus of flowering plants belonging to the family Cactaceae with the sole species Cremnocereus albipilosus.

== Description ==
Cremnocereus albipilosus is a clustering species of cactus, semi-decumbent, but is also somewhat erect. The cylindrical shoots are up to 6 feet tall, and are often confused with that of Espostoa, Oreocereus, Espostoopsis, Micranthocereus, and Cleistocactus because of the white hairs. With 20-25 ribs, the stems are covered in fine white hairs, up to 8 cm. Areoles are 4 mm in diameter, 7 to 8 mm apart. Flowers are found on the apical tip of the stems. These flowers are tubular, pink, and are up to 5 cm long. Fruits are not known.
