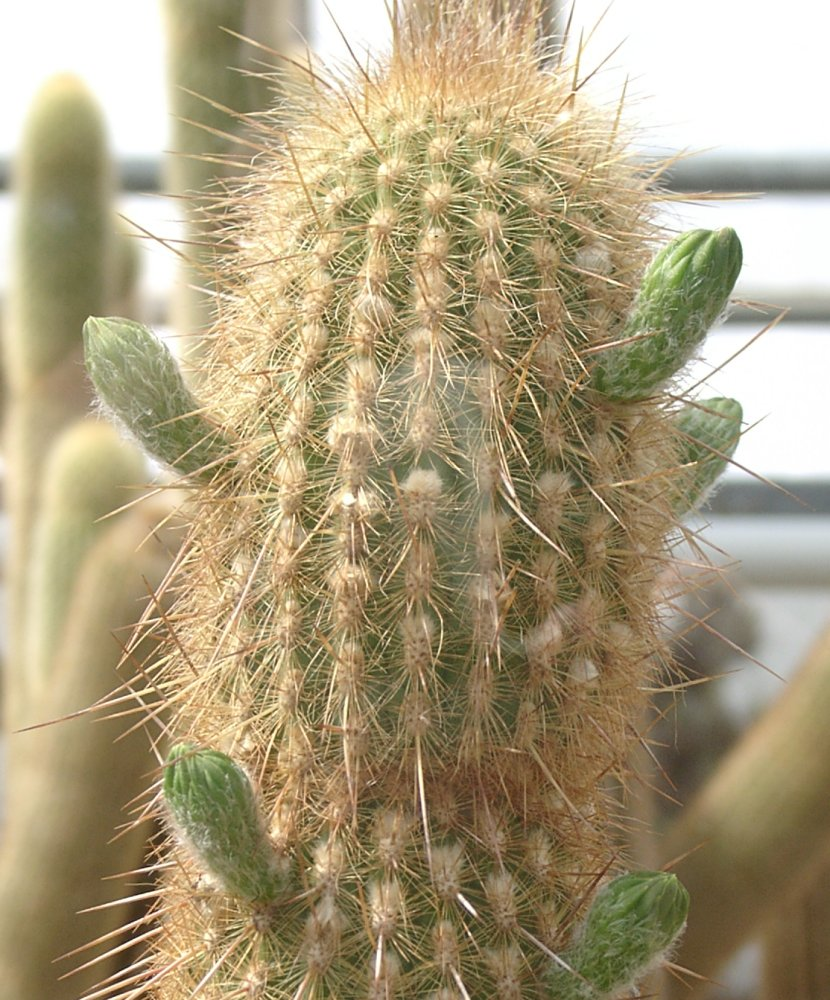
- Haageocereus pacalaensis of the tribe Trichocereeae.

Scientific classification
- Kingdom: Plantae
- Clade: Tracheophytes
- Clade: Angiosperms
- Clade: Eudicots
- Order: Caryophyllales
- Family: Cactaceae
- Subfamily: Cactoideae
- Tribe: Cereeae
- Subtribe: Trichocereinae; Buxb. (1958)

Type genus
- Trichocereus

Genera
- See text

= Trichocereinae =

Subtribe of cacti

Trichocereinae is a subtribe of cactus that are particular to South America. There are 28 recognized genera in this subtribe.

== Description ==
Arborescent to shrubby, Trichocereinae normally form unsegmented, spherical to columnar stems that are usually ribbed, tuberculate, or ribbed-warty.

The small to fairly large, regular or bilaterally symmetrical flowers appear laterally or below the apex and open day or night. The flower cup is scaled or covered with hair.

The fruits are fleshy to berry-like and sometimes burst open lengthwise. They contain small to medium-sized seeds that vary in shape. Hilum and micropyle of seeds are fused to united. Appendages are usually absent. A strophic is present in some.

== Genera ==
The composition of the subtribes of the tribe Cereeae varies. The list below is based on genera accepted by Plants of the World Online as of March 2025. Most were placed in subtribe Trichocereinae by Lendel in 2013. Reicheocactus (listed here) was not included in Lendel's analysis, and was described as basal to the subtribe. Pygmaeocereus was placed in Trichocereinae in a 2023 study.

Image	Genus
	Acanthocalycium Backeb. 1936
	Arthrocereus A.Berger 1929
	Borzicactus Riccob. 1909
	Chamaecereus Britton & Rose 1922, synonym of Echinopsis
	Cephalocleistocactus F.Ritter
	Cleistocactus Lem. 1861
	Echinopsis Zucc. 1837
	Espostoa Britton & Rose 1920
	Haageocereus Backeb. 1933
	Harrisia Britton 1908 publ. 1909
	Lasiocereus F.Ritter (uncertainly in this subtribe)
	Leucostele Backeb. 1953
	Lobivia Britton & Rose 1922
	Loxanthocereus Backeb. 1937
	Matucana Britton & Rose 1922
	Mila Britton & Rose 1922
	Oreocereus Riccob. 1909
	Pygmaeocereus H.Johnson & Backeb.
	Rauhocereus Backeb. 1956 publ. 1957
	Reicheocactus Backeb. 1942
	Samaipaticereus Cárdenas
	Setiechinopsis Backeb. ex de Haas 1940
	Soehrensia Backeb. 1938, synonym of Echinopsis
	Trichocereus (A.Berger) Riccob. 1909
	Vatricania Backeb. 1950
	Weberbauerocereus Backeb. 1942
	Yungasocereus F.Ritter 1980

== Intergeneric hybrids ==
Naturally occurring hybrids between genera in the subtribe include:

- × Borzicana M.H.J.van der Meer = Borzicactus × Matucana
- × Haagespostoa G.D.Rowley = Haageocereus × Espostoa
- × Harricereus M.H.J.van der Meer = Harrisia × Cereus
- × Leia M.H.J.van der Meer = Leucostele × Sohrensia
- × Leucomoza M.H.J.van der Meer = Denmoza × Leucostele
- × Oreonopsis G.D.Rowley = Echinopsis × Oreocereus
- × Raustoa M.H.J.van der Meer = Rauhocereus × Espostoa
- × Weberbostoa G.D.Rowley = Weberbauerocereus × Espostoa
- × Weinganopsis G.D.Rowley = Weingartia × Echinopsis
- × Yungastocactus G.D.Rowley Yungasocereus × Cleistocactus

Artificial hybrids include:

- × Chamaelobivia Y.Itô = Chamaecyparis × Lobivia
- × Cleistopsis Strigl = Cleistocactus × Echinopsis.
- × Trichopsis Y.Itô = Echinopsis × Trichocereus
- × Harrisinopsis G.D.Rowley = Echinopsis × Harrisia
