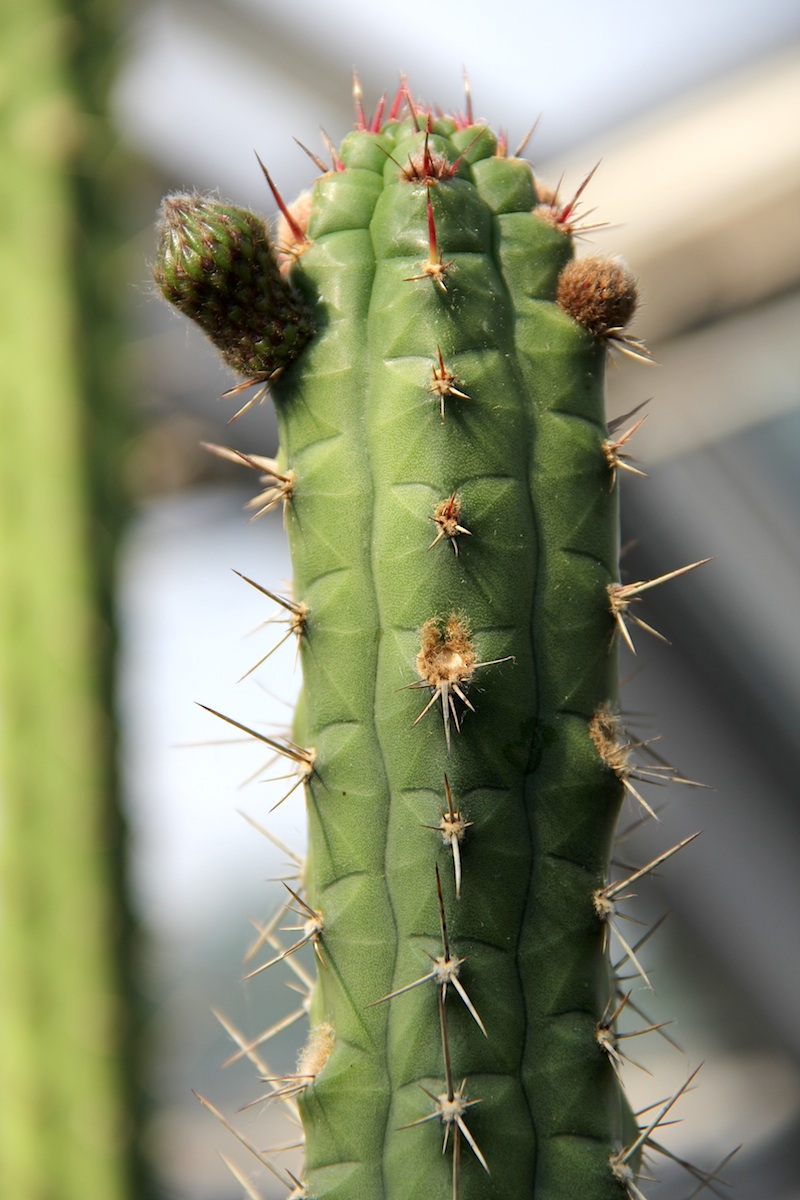
- Rauhocereus riosaniensis in cultivation

Conservation status
- Least Concern (IUCN 3.1)

Scientific classification
- Kingdom: Plantae
- Clade: Tracheophytes
- Clade: Angiosperms
- Clade: Eudicots
- Order: Caryophyllales
- Family: Cactaceae
- Subfamily: Cactoideae
- Tribe: Cereeae
- Subtribe: Trichocereinae
- Genus: Rauhocereus; Backeb.
- Species: R. riosaniensis

Binomial name
- Rauhocereus riosaniensis Backeb.

Synonyms
- Browningia riosaniensis (Backeb.) G.D.Rowley

= Rauhocereus =

Genus of plant

Rauhocereus is a monotypic genus of cacti (family Cactaceae). Its only species is Rauhocereus riosaniensis, which has nocturnal flowers. It is known from northern Peru (Rio Santa, Rio Zana, Chamaya and Jaén).

== Description ==
The mostly shrubby Rauhocereus riosaniensis, usually branching from the ground, often forms thickets up to 4 meters high. The upright, columnar shoots are bluish-green and have a diameter of 8 to 15 cm (3.1 to 5.9 in). The 5 to 6 ribs are broken up into many warts. 2 to 8 strong spines, up to 5 cm (2.0 in) long, emerge from the woolly areoles. The lower ones are initially reddish, the upper ones yellowish. Later all become greyish-white.

The bell-shaped flowers appear near the shoot tip. They open at night, are 8 to 10 cm (3.1 to 3.9 in) long and have a diameter of up to 5 cm (2.0 in). The flower cup and the flower tube are covered with small scales and curly brown hairs.

The red, fleshy fruits are ovoid with a persistent flower rest. They contain small, ovoid, shiny black seeds.

== Taxonomy ==
The genus and its only species were first described in 1957 by Curt Backeberg. As of October 2023, Plants of the World Online accepted two subspecies:

- Rauhocereus riosaniensis subsp. jaenensis (Rauh) Ostolaza
- Rauhocereus riosaniensis subsp. riosaniensis

=== Hybrids ===
==== × Raustoa ====
A hybrid of Rauhocereus riosaniensis subsp. jaenensis and Espostoa superba is found in Jaén, Peru.

== Distribution ==
Rauhocereus riosaniensis is found in northern Peru in the Amazonas and Cajamarca regions at altitudes of 500 to 1000 meters.
