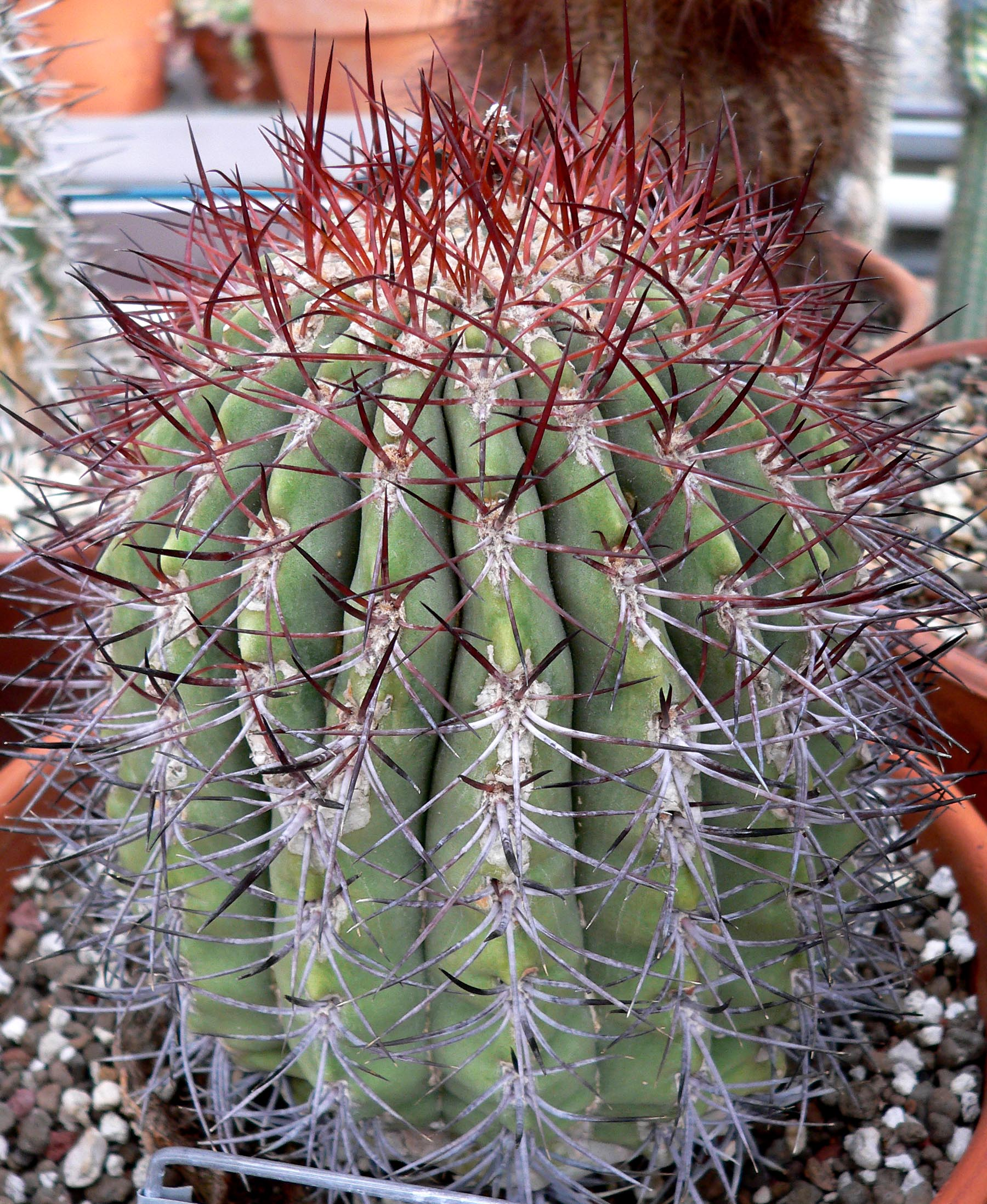

Conservation status
- Least Concern (IUCN 3.1)

Scientific classification
- Kingdom: Plantae
- Clade: Tracheophytes
- Clade: Angiosperms
- Clade: Eudicots
- Order: Caryophyllales
- Family: Cactaceae
- Subfamily: Cactoideae
- Genus: Denmoza; Britton & Rose
- Species: D. rhodacantha

Binomial name
- Denmoza rhodacantha (Salm-Dyck) Britton & Rose

Synonyms
- Cactus coccineus Gillies ex Loudon; Cereus erythrocephalus (K.Schum.) A.Berger; Cereus rhodacanthus (Salm-Dyck) F.A.C.Weber; Cleistocactus rhodacanthus (Salm-Dyck) Lem.; Denmoza ducis-pauli (C.F.Först. ex Rümpler) Werderm. ex Backeb.; Denmoza erythrocephala (K.Schum.) A.Berger; Denmoza rhodacantha var. diamantina Slaba; Denmoza strausii var. luteispina Frič; Echinocactus coccineus Pfeiff.; Echinocactus rhodacanthus Salm-Dyck; Echinocactus rhodacanthus var. coccineus Monv. ex Labour.; Echinopsis ducis-pauli C.F.Först. ex Rümpler; Echinopsis rhodacantha (Salm-Dyck) Salm-Dyck; Furiolobivia ducis-pauli (C.F.Först.) Y.Itô; Lobivia ducis-pauli (C.F.Först.) Borg; Mammillaria coccinea G.Don; Pilocereus erythrocephalus K.Schum.; Pilocereus rhodacanthus (Salm-Dyck) Speg.; Pseudolobivia ducis-pauli (C.F.Först.) Krainz

= Denmoza =

Species of cactus

Denmoza is a monotypic genus of cactus with the sole species Denmoza rhodacantha, synonym Echinopsis rhodacantha, native to northwest Argentina.

== Description ==
Denmoza rhodocantha starts out as a globular cactus and stays that way for quite some time before growing into a 0.5 to 1.5 m (1.5 to 5 ft) column with a diameter of 20 to 30 cm (8 to 12 in). The 30 or more ribs are high and wide, with a width of 1 cm (0.4 in) at the base. The first areoles are confluent and bear brownish-red spines, later grey. The 8 to 10 radial spines are slightly bent. The areoles from which the flowers sprout also produce a series of long brown bristles as well as long spines up to 7 cm (2.8 in). The tubular flowers are scarlet. The fruits are spherical and contain shiny black-brown seeds with a diameter of about 1.3 mm (0.05 in).

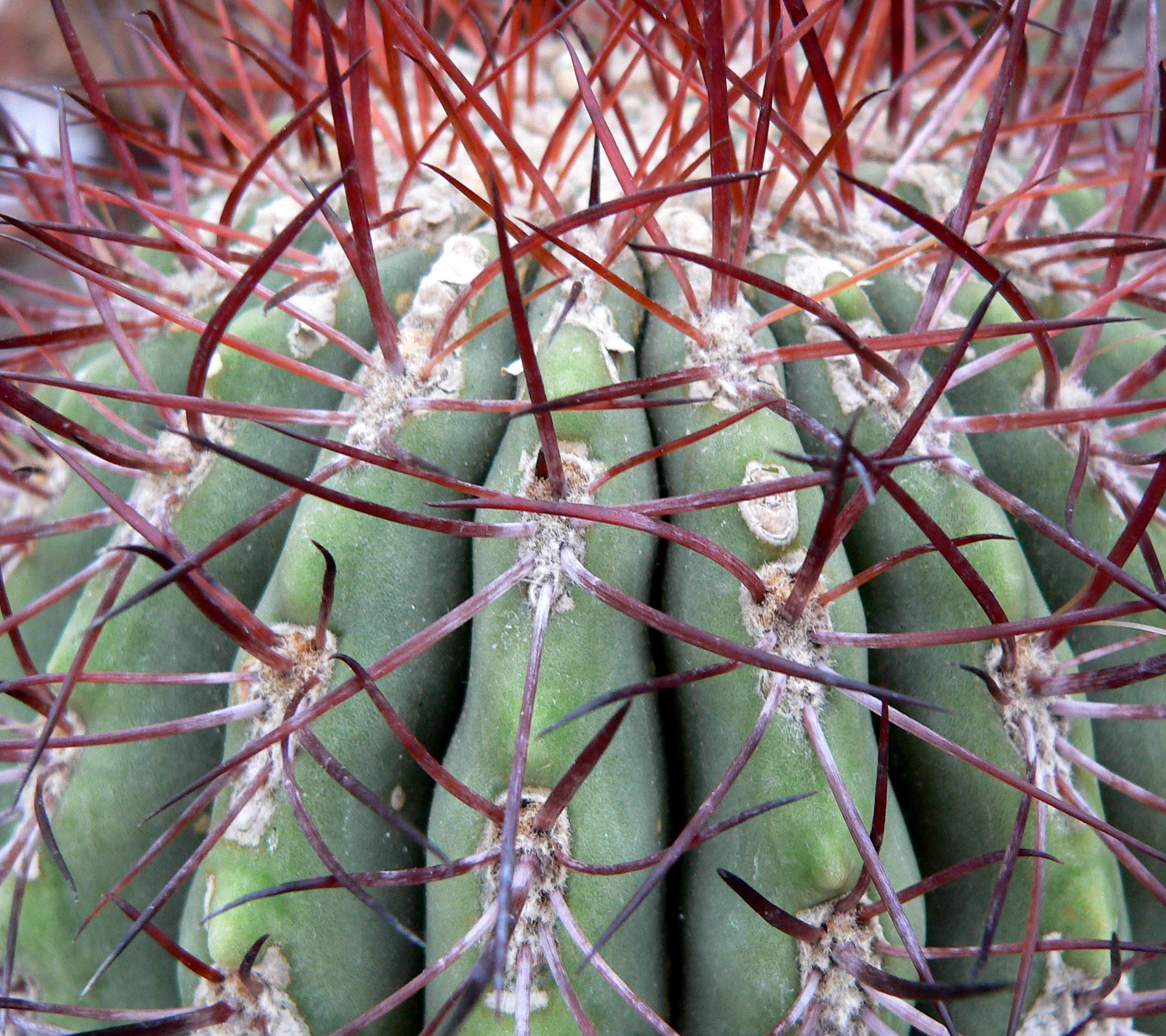
Spines

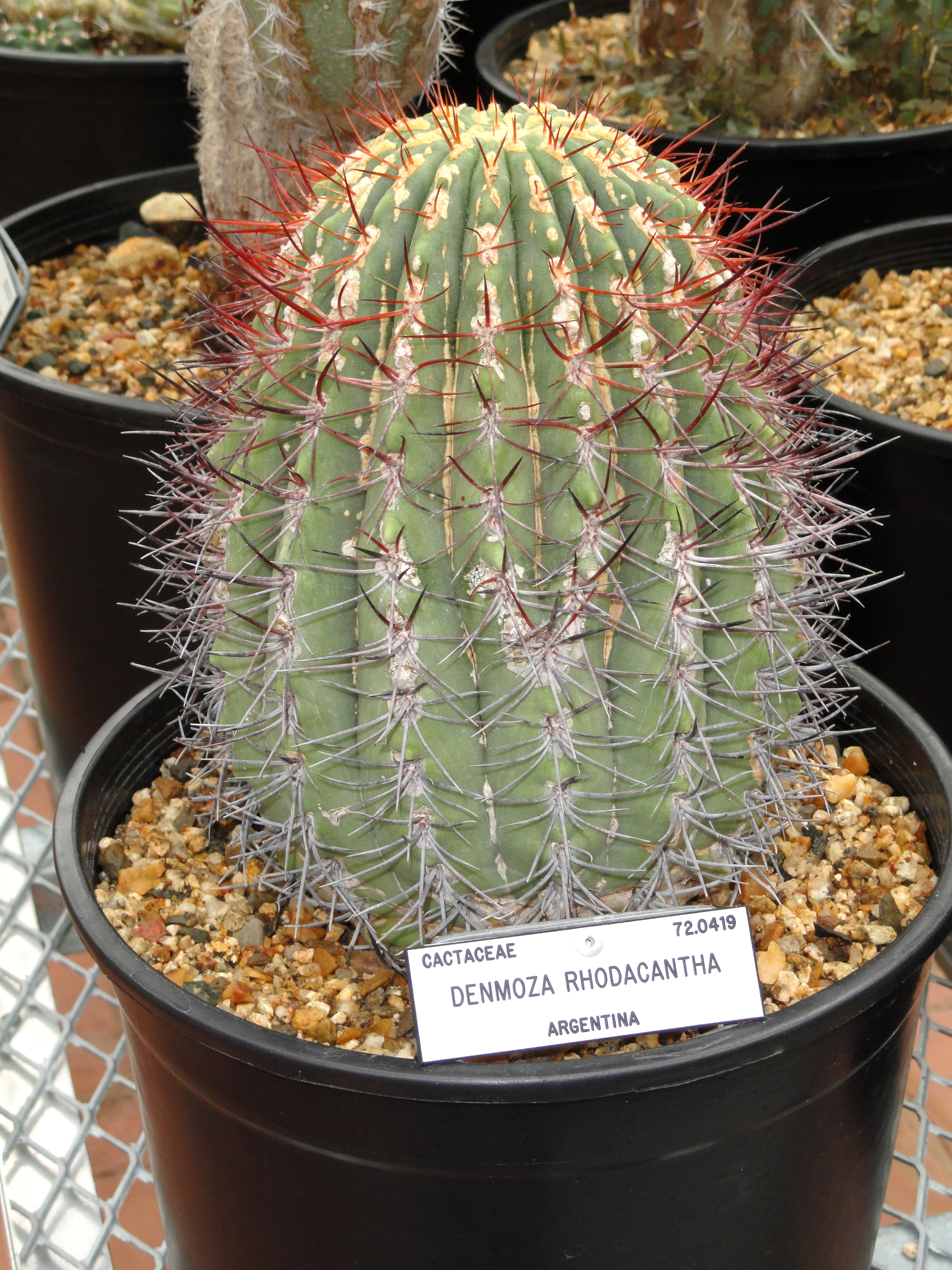
Plant grown in University of California Botanical Garden

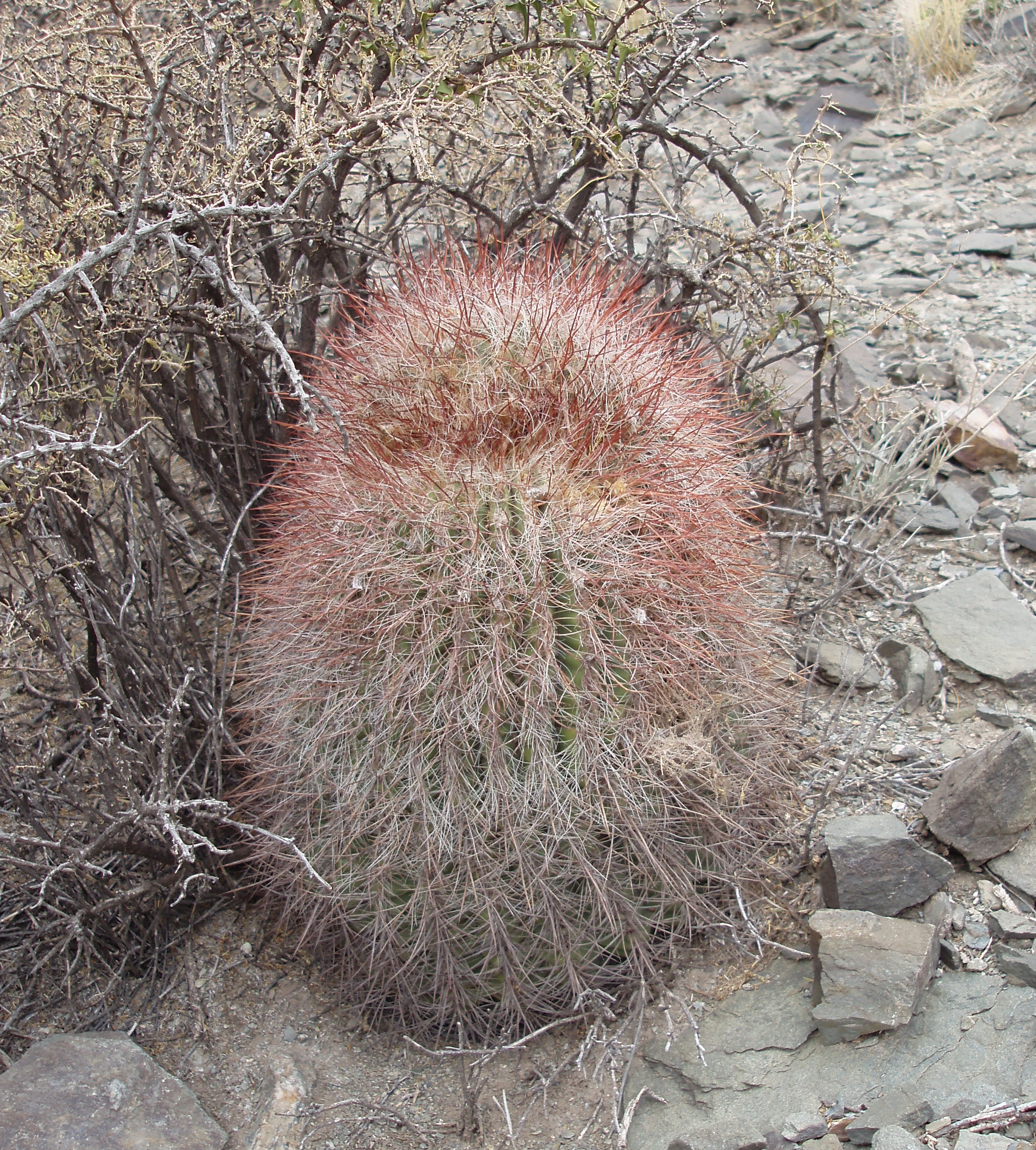
Plant growing in habitat in Uspallata, Argentina

== Taxonomy ==
The first plants were probably discovered in 1821 by John Gilles near the city of Mendoza. They were given the name Cactus coccineus, but this has never been validly published. The species was first described as Echinocactus rhodacanthus in 1834 by Joseph zu Salm-Reifferscheidt-Dyck. Nathaniel Lord Britton and Joseph Nelson Rose transferred the species to their newly established genus Denmoza in 1922. As of November 2025, Plants of the World Online accepted the placement in Denmoza.

== Distribution ==
Denmoza rhodacantha is found in northwestern and western Argentina on the eastern slopes and foothills of the Andes in the provinces from Mendoza to Salta at altitudes of 800 to 2800 meters.

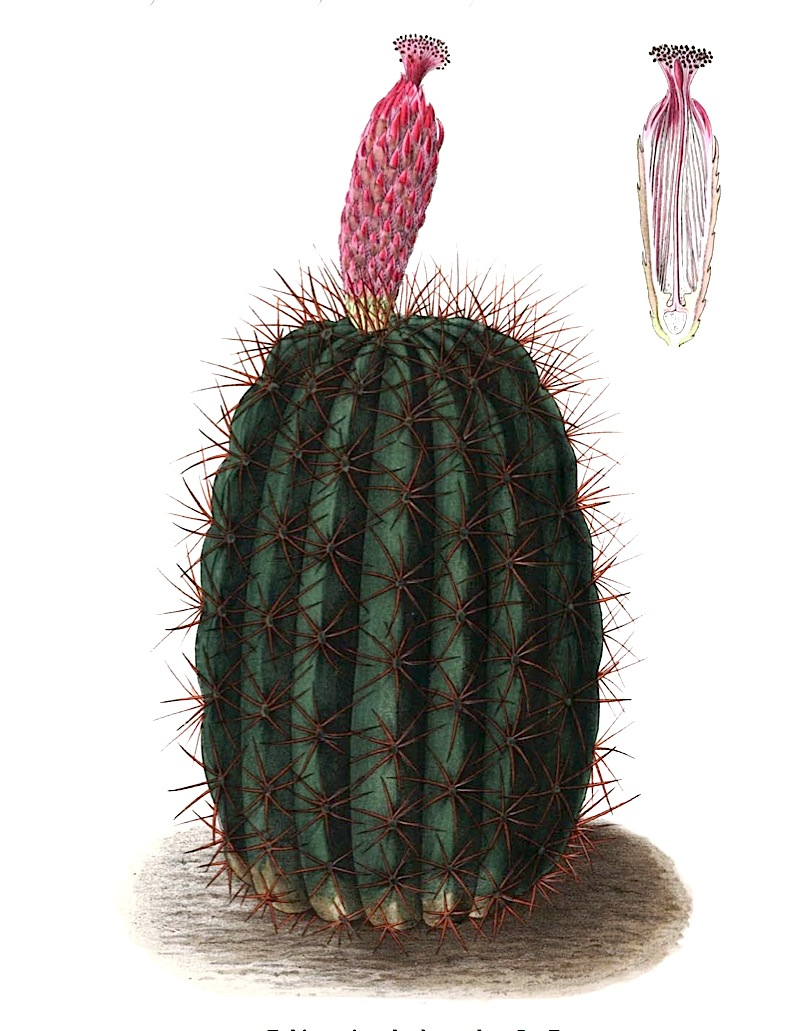
Plate as Echinopsis rhodocantha in Blühende Kakteen - Iconographia Cactacearum Tafel 16 (1904)

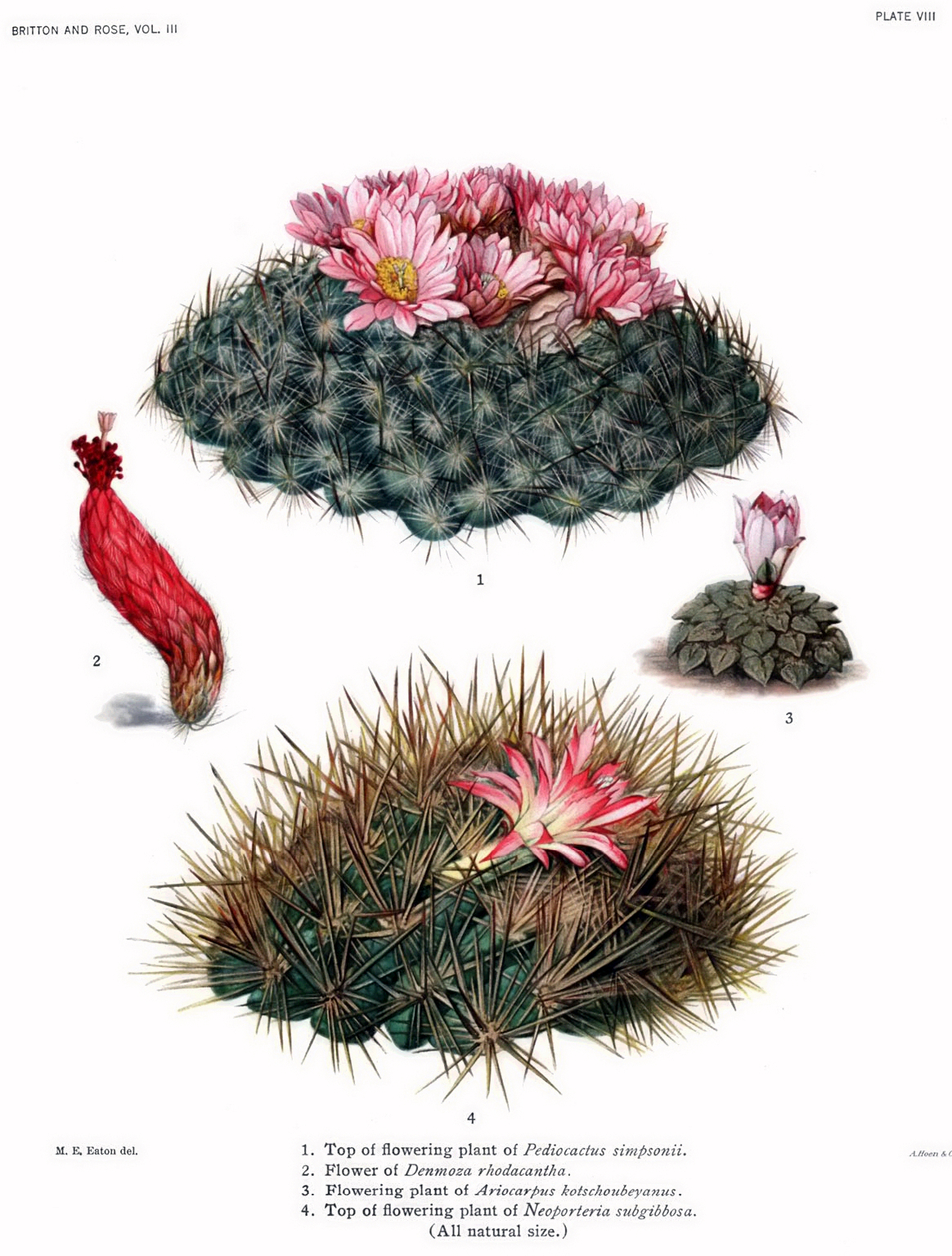
As Echinopsis rhodocantha from The Cactaceae (1919-1923) by Britton et Rose, Vol. III. (1922)

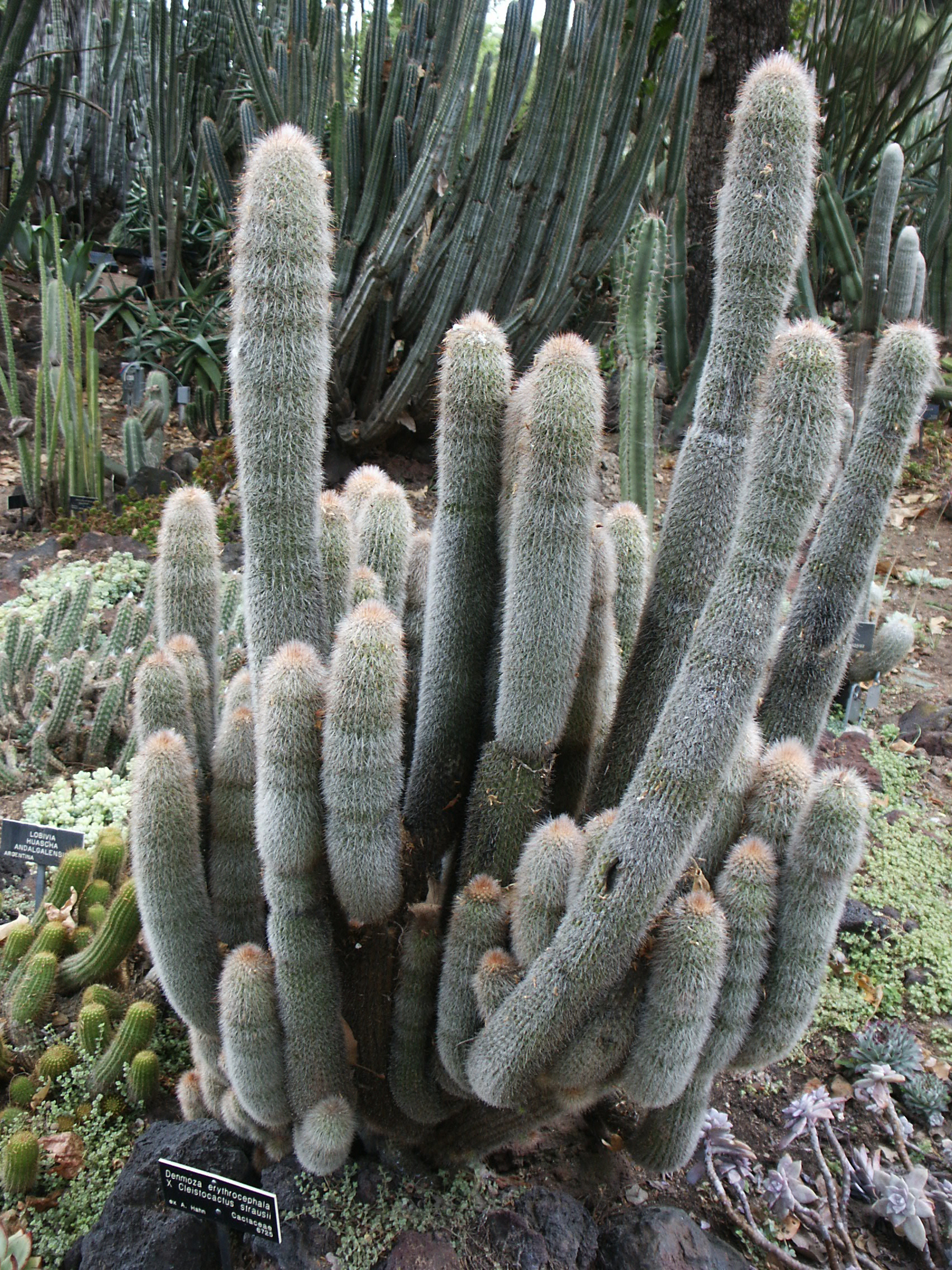
A hybrid with Cleistocactus strausii, Huntington Desert Garden
