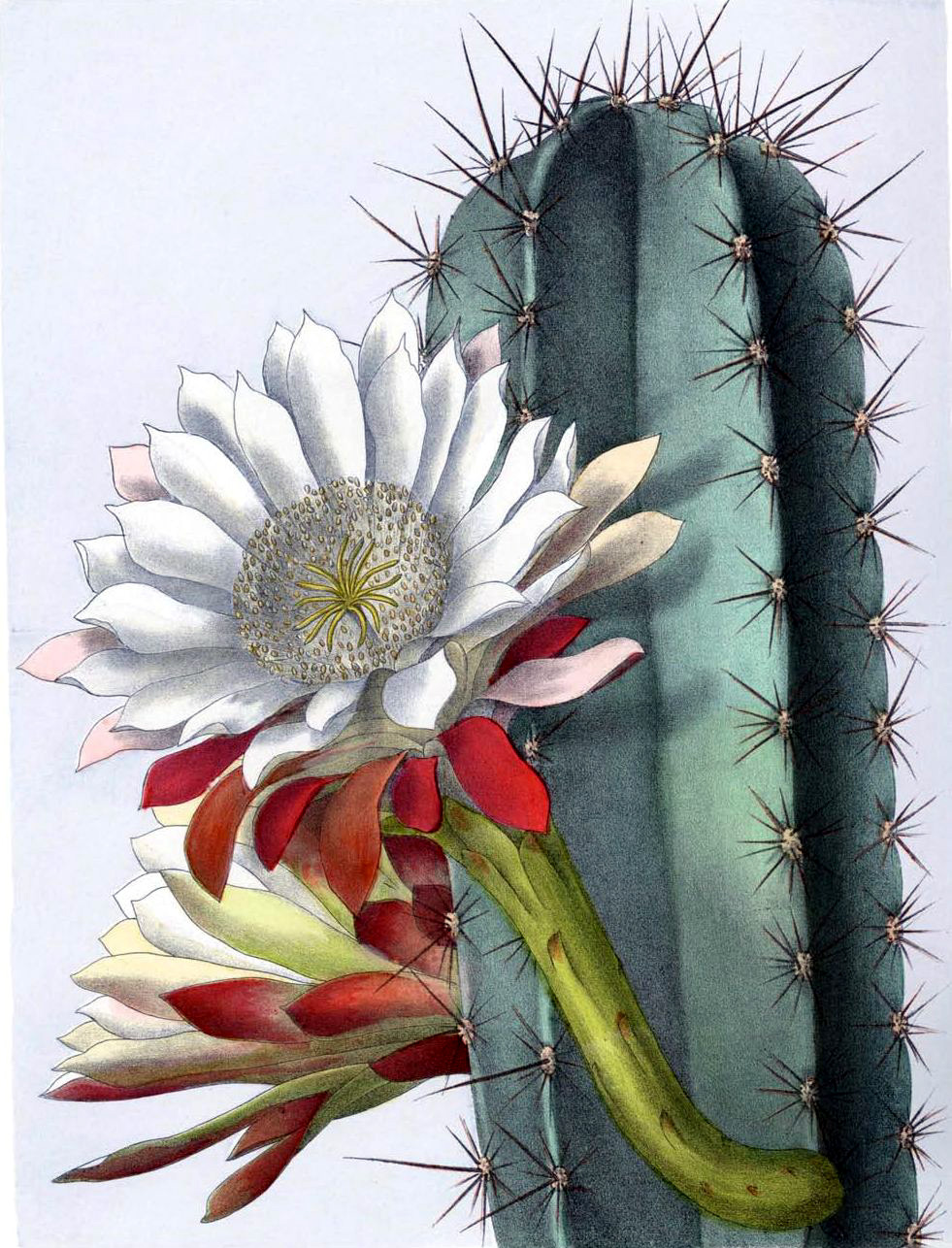
- Cereus repandus

Scientific classification
- Kingdom: Plantae
- Clade: Tracheophytes
- Clade: Angiosperms
- Clade: Eudicots
- Order: Caryophyllales
- Family: Cactaceae
- Subfamily: Cactoideae
- Tribe: Cereeae

Type genus
- Cereus

Subtribes
- See text.

Synonyms
- Trichocereeae Buxb. (1958)

= Cereeae =

Tribe of cacti

Cereeae is a tribe of cacti belonging to the subfamily Cactoideae containing about 50 genera, divided in 2023 among six subtribes.

== Description ==
Cereeae are tree-like or shrubby, sometimes climbing plants. Their mostly elongated to spherical, ribbed and thorny shoots are not articulated. The flowers, which usually appear on the side of the shoot, open during the day or at night. Their pericarpels usually have a few scales or are completely glabrous. The fleshy, berry-like, bursting or non-bursting fruits often have a blackening adherent flower remnant. The small to large seeds are oval. The hilum and micropyle of the seeds are fused, one appendage is absent.

== Taxonomy ==
=== Phylogeny ===
In classifications before the use of molecular phylogenetic methods, Cereeae was one of nine tribes into which the subfamily Cactoideae was divided. Molecular studies found that these traditional tribes were not monophyletic. A broader circumscription of Cereeae, including Browningieae and Trichocereeae and comprising most columnar cacti of South American origin, was found to be monophyletic. With this circumscription, Cereeae was divided into three subtribes: Rebutiinae, Trichocereinae and Cereinae, although Rebutiinae appeared not to be monophyletic. A 2021 study confirmed that Trichocereinae and Cereinae are monophyletic, but that Rebutiinae as then circumscribed was not.

A 2023 study proposed six subtribes, which it found to be monophyletic. Rebutiinae was split into four subtribes: Aylosterinae, Gymnocalyciinae, Rebutiinae, and Uebelmanniinae. (Two genera, Espostoopsis and Stetsonia, were moved to different subtribes.) The study used a number of large datasets. Two genome-scale datasets agreed that the relationship among Rebutiinae, Trichocereinae, Gymnocalyciinae and Cereinae was as shown below. Limited coverage of the other two subtribes in the two datasets and low resolution in the analysis of a separate gene-based dataset meant that the study could not be certain as to which of Uebelmanniinae and Aylosterinae was the earliest diverging group, although the gene-based dataset suggested it was Uebelmanniinae.

- Cereeae
  - Uebelmanniinae
  - - Aylosterinae
    - - Rebutiinae
      - - Trichocereinae
        - - Gymnocalyciinae
          - Cereinae

=== Subtribes ===
Historically, the circumscription of subtribes and genera in the Cereeae has been "highly controversial", and subject to considerable change. Six subtribes were proposed in a 2023 study. The table below compares the 2023 classification with a widely used 2010 classification. As of December 2024, Plants of the World Online accepted some genera that were treated as synonyms in the 2010 and 2023 studies. These genera are included in the table together with a note of the name used in one or both of the studies.

Subtribes of Cereeae
Genus	2023 classification	2010 classification
Uebelmannia Buining	Uebelmanniinae	Rebutiinae
Aylostera Spegazzini	Aylosterinae	Rebutiinae
Browningia Britton & Rose	Rebutiinae	Rebutiinae
Rebutia K.Schum.	Rebutiinae	Rebutiinae
Weingartia Werderm.	Rebutiinae	Rebutiinae
Gymnocalycium Mittler	Gymnocalyciinae	Rebutiinae
Acanthocalycium Backeb.	–	Trichocereinae
Arthrocereus A.Berger	Trichocereinae	Trichocereinae
Borzicactus Riccob.	Trichocereinae	Trichocereinae
Chamaecereus Britton & Rose (as Echinopsis)	Trichocereinae	Trichocereinae
Cleistocactus Lem. (synonyms Samaipaticereus and Yungasocereus)	Trichocereinae	Trichocereinae
Denmoza Britton & Rose (as Echinopsis)	Trichocereinae	Trichocereinae
Echinopsis Zucc.	Trichocereinae	Trichocereinae
Espostoa Britton & Rose	Trichocereinae	Trichocereinae
Haageocereus Backeb.	Trichocereinae	Trichocereinae
Harrisia Britton	Trichocereinae	Trichocereinae
Lasiocereus F.Ritter	Trichocereinae incertae sedis	Rebutiinae
Leucostele Backeb. (as Echinopsis)	Trichocereinae	Trichocereinae
Lobivia Britton & Rose (as Echinopsis)	Trichocereinae	Trichocereinae
Loxanthocereus Backeb. (as Haageocereus)	Trichocereinae	Trichocereinae
Matucana Britton & Rose	Trichocereinae	Trichocereinae
Mila Britton & Rose	Trichocereinae	Trichocereinae
Oreocereus (A.Berger) Riccob.	Trichocereinae	Trichocereinae
Oroya Britton & Rose	Trichocereinae	Trichocereinae
Pygmaeocereus Johns. & Backeb.	Trichocereinae	Trichocereinae
Rauhocereus Backeb.	Trichocereinae	Trichocereinae
Reicheocactus Backeb	Trichocereinae	Trichocereinae
Setiechinopsis Backeb. ex de Haas (as Echinopsis)	Trichocereinae	Trichocereinae
Soehrensia Backeb (as Echinopsis)	Trichocereinae	Trichocereinae
Trichocereus Britton & Rose	Trichocereinae	Trichocereinae
Vatricania Backeb (as Cleistocactus)	Trichocereinae	Trichocereinae
Weberbauerocereus Backeb.	Trichocereinae	Trichocereinae
Arrojadoa Britton & Rose	Trichocereinae	Cereinae
Brasilicereus Backeb. (as Facheiroa)	Trichocereinae	Cereinae
Cereus Mill.		Cereinae
Cipocereus F.Ritter		Cereinae
Coleocephalocereus Backeb.		Cereinae
Discocactus Pfeiff.		Cereinae
Espostoopsis Buxb.	Trichocereinae	Cereinae
Facheiroa Britton & Rose	Cereinae	Cereinae
Leocereus Britton & Rose (synonym of Facheiroa)	Cereinae	Cereinae
Melocactus Link & Otto	Cereinae	Cereinae
Micranthocereus Backeb.	Cereinae	Cereinae
Pilosocereus Byles & G.Rowley	Cereinae	Cereinae
Praecereus F.Buxb.	Cereinae	Cereinae
Serrulatocereus Guiggi (only species now included in Cereus)	Cereinae	Cereinae
Stetsonia Britton & Rose	Rebutiinae	Cereinae
Xiquexique Lavor & Calvente	Cereinae	Cereinae
