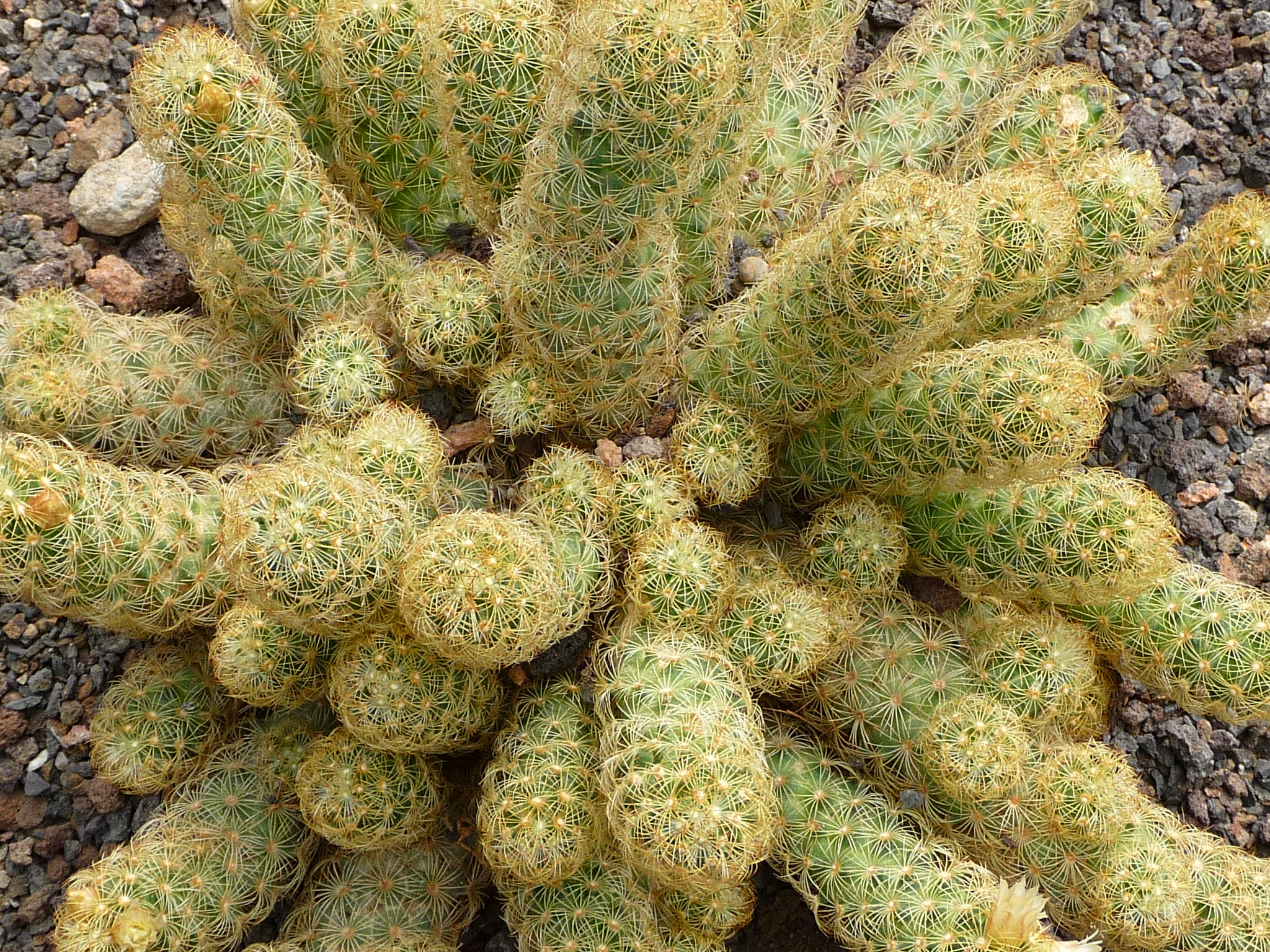
- Mammillaria elongata

Scientific classification
- Kingdom: Plantae
- Clade: Tracheophytes
- Clade: Angiosperms
- Clade: Eudicots
- Order: Caryophyllales
- Family: Cactaceae
- Subfamily: Cactoideae; Eaton

Tribes or clades
- See text.

= Cactoideae =

Subfamily of the cactus family, Cactaceae

The Cactoideae are the largest subfamily of the cactus family, Cactaceae, and are widely distributed throughout the Americas. Around 80% of cactus species belong to this subfamily. The genera of the Cactoideae are characterized by microscopic foliage leaves. All photosynthesis occurs in shoot cortex cells covered by a persistent epidermis and stomata. Another important characteristic of this subfamily is ribbed stems, which enable the inner cortex to expand radially without breaking the shoot surface to absorb large quantities of water.

As of August 2018, the internal classification of the family Cactaceae remained uncertain and subject to change. A classification incorporating many of the insights from the molecular studies was produced by Nyffeler and Eggli in 2010. Various revisions have been published since, e.g. to the tribes Hylocereeae and Echinocereeae, and the tribe Cereeae. Classifications remained uncertain as of December 2024.

== Tribes and genera ==
- Blossfeldieae
  - Blossfeldia
- Fraileeae
  - Frailea
- Cereeae
  - Aylosterinae
    - Aylostera
  - Cereinae
    - Arrojadoa – Brasilicereus – Cereus – Cipocereus – Coleocephalocereus – Discocactus – Espostoopsis – Facheiroa – Melocactus – Micranthocereus – Pilosocereus – Praecereus – Stetsonia – Xiquexique
  - Gymnocalyciinae
    - Gymnocalycium
  - Rebutiinae
    - Browningia –Castellanosia –Rebutia – Weingartia
  - Trichocereinae
    - Acanthocalycium – Arthrocereus – Borzicactus – Chamaecereus – Cleistocactus – Denmoza – Echinopsis – Espostoa – Haageocereus – Harrisia – Lasiocereus – Leucostele – Lobivia – Loxanthocereus – Matucana – Mila – Oreocereus – Oroya – Rauhocereus – Reicheocactus – Samaipaticereus – Setiechinopsis – Soehrensia – Trichocereus – Vatricania – Weberbauerocereus
  - Uebelmanniinae
    - Uebelmannia
- Cacteae
  - Acharagma – Ariocarpus – Astrophytum – Aztekium – Chichimecactus – Cochemiea – Coryphantha – Echinocactus – Epithelantha – Ferocactus – Geohintonia – Kadenicarpus – Kroenleinia – Leuchtenbergia – Lophophora – Mammillaria – Obregonia – Pediocactus – Pelecyphora – Rapicactus – Sclerocactus – Stenocactus – Strombocactus – Thelocactus – Turbinicarpus
- Echinocereeae
  - Armatocereus – (Acanthocereus is placed in Hylocereeae) –Austrocactus – Bergerocactus – Brachycereus – Carnegiea – Cephalocereus – Corryocactus – Echinocereus – Escontria – Isolatocereus – Jasminocereus – Leptocereus – Lophocereus – Marshallocereus – Mitrocereus – Myrtillocactus – Neoraimondia –Pachycereus – Peniocereus – Pfeiffera – Pilosocereus – Polaskia – Stenocereus – Strophocactus
- Hylocereeae
  - Acanthocereus – Deamia – Disocactus – Epiphyllum – Kimnachia – Pseudorhipsalis – Selenicereus (including Hylocereus) – Weberocereus
- Lymanbensonieae
  - Calymmanthium – Lymanbensonia
- Notocacteae
  - Copiapoa – Eriosyce – Neowerdermannia – Parodia –Rimacactus– Yavia
- Rhipsalideae
  - Hatiora – Lepismium – Rhipsalis – Rhipsalidopsis – Schlumbergera
- incertae sedis
  - Cremnocereus
