= Cipocereus laniflorus =

Conservation status
- Endangered (IUCN 3.1)

Scientific classification
- Kingdom: Plantae
- Clade: Tracheophytes
- Clade: Angiosperms
- Clade: Eudicots
- Order: Caryophyllales
- Family: Cactaceae
- Subfamily: Cactoideae
- Genus: Cipocereus
- Species: C. laniflorus

Binomial name
- Cipocereus laniflorus N.P.Taylor & D.C.Zappi

Synonyms
- Cereus laniflorus (N.P.Taylor & D.C.Zappi ) Anceschi & Magli; Pilosocereus laniflorus (N.P.Taylor & D.C.Zappi ) P.J.Braun & Esteves

Species of plant

Cipocereus laniflorus is a species of succulent flowering plant in the genus Cipocereus, within the family Cactaceae. It is endemic to southeastern Brazil.

== Description ==
Cipocereus laniflorus is a species of cactus with a treelike habit. Its stems, which branch out from the base of the plant, are columnar and olive-green in color. They can reach 2 m in height and 4 cm in diameter.

The stems have 5-7 triangular ribs, on which the light brown to black areoles are situated. From the areoles emerge long, white hairs; over time, the areoles fuse and form continuous bands on the ribs. Furthermore, the areoles have translucent, dark brown spines, among which are 7-9 central spines, which measure 1.5-3 cm long. 10-14 marginal spines (up to 1 cm long) are also present per areole.

The flowers are woolly and spiny. They are white to light creamy yellow in color, and measure 7 cm long and 3.5 cm wide. The fruits are ovoid, grooved, more or less blue-purple in color, and like the flowers, woolly and spiny. The seeds are brown in color.

== Distribution and habitat ==
Cipocereus laniflorus is native to the state of Minas Gerais in southeastern Brazil. It is mainly found in the seasonally-dry tropical biome.

== Taxonomy ==
Cipocereus laniflorus was described by the botanists Nigel Paul Taylor and Daniela Cristina Zappi, who first published this name in the scientific journal Cactaceae Consensus Initiatives 3: 7 in 1997.

Etymology

- Cipocereus: the genus name comes from "Cipo" (which refers to Serra do Cipó National Park in Minas Gerais, where one of the species in this genus is found) and the Latin word cereus (meaning "candle"), which refers to the tall, straight form of these plants.
- laniflorus: the specific epithet is derived from the Latin terms lana (meaning "wool") and florus (meaning "flower"), in reference to this species' characteristic woolly flowers.

== Conservation status ==
On the IUCN Red List, Cipocereus laniflorus is classified as Endangered (EN).

== Cultivation ==
Cipocereus laniflorus is mainly cultivated as an ornamental plant. It can be propagated vegetatively by cuttings, or by seeds.
