= Cipocereus pleurocarpus =

Conservation status
- Least Concern (IUCN 3.1)

Scientific classification
- Kingdom: Plantae
- Clade: Tracheophytes
- Clade: Angiosperms
- Clade: Eudicots
- Order: Caryophyllales
- Family: Cactaceae
- Subfamily: Cactoideae
- Genus: Cipocereus
- Species: C. pleurocarpus

Binomial name
- Cipocereus pleurocarpus F.Ritter

Synonyms
- Cipocereus minensis subsp. pleurocarpus (F.Ritter) N.P.Taylor & Zappi; Coleocephalocereus pleurocarpus (F.Ritter) F.H.Brandt; Pilosocereus pleurocarpus (F.Ritter) P.J.Braun

Species of plant

Cipocereus pleurocarpus is a species of succulent flowering plant in the genus Cipocereus, within the family Cactaceae. It is endemic to southeastern Brazil.

== Description ==
Cipocereus pleurocarpus is a species of cactus with a treelike habit, with straight, columnar stems that are gray-green in color.

The stems have 8-18 rounded ribs, on which the heavily-spined areoles are situated. The spines are brown in color, and there is no distinct central spine.

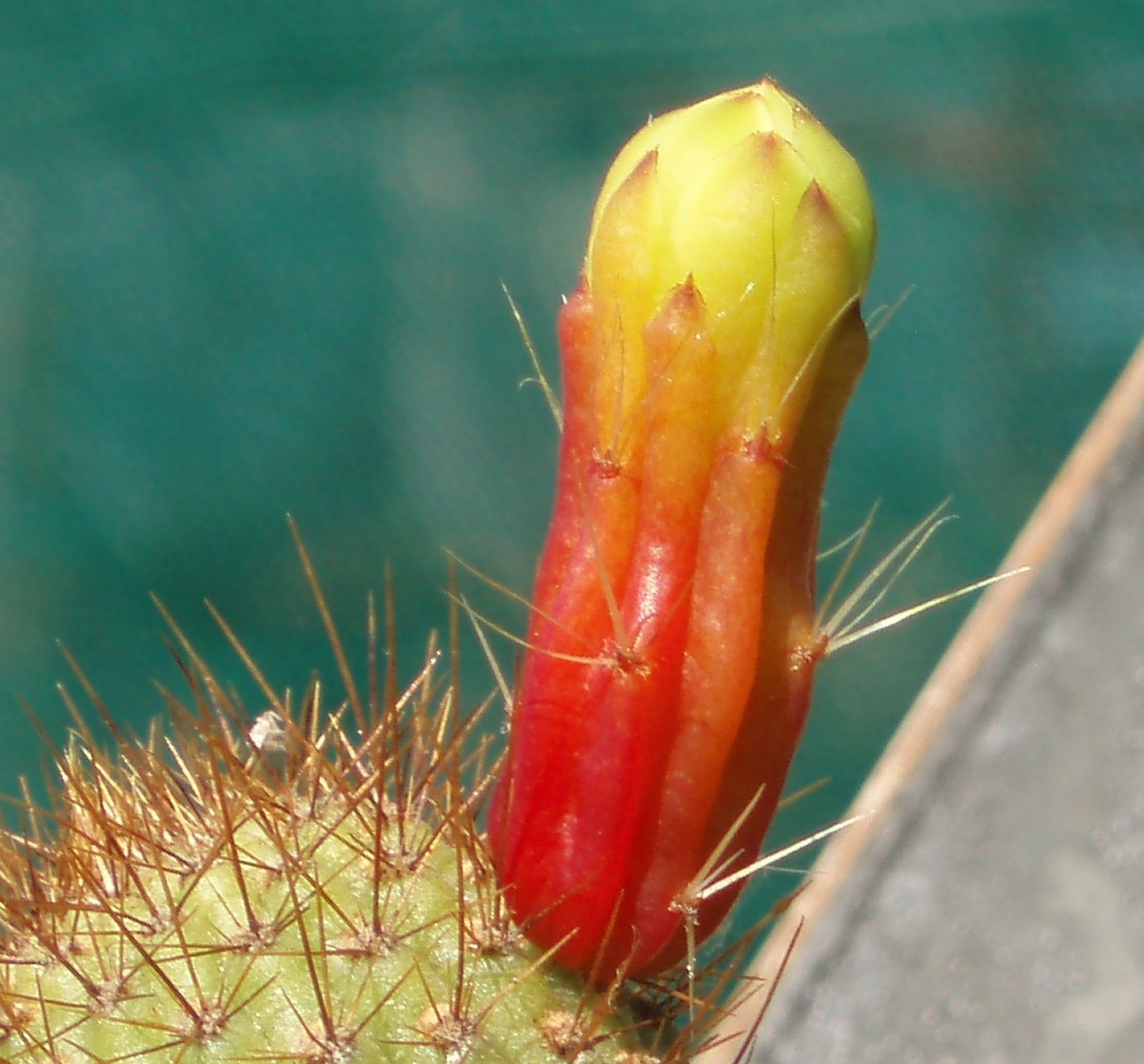
Flower of Cipocereus pleurocarpus

The flowers open at night and are red and yellow in color. They measure up to 5 cm long and 3 cm in diameter. The fruits develop laterally to the stems; when mature, they are spherical, and measure more than 3 cm in diameter.

== Distribution and habitat ==
Cipocereus pleurocarpus is native to the state of Minas Gerais in southeastern Brazil. It is mainly found in the seasonally-dry tropical biome.

== Taxonomy ==
Cipocereus pleurocarpus was described by the German botanist Friedrich Ritter, who first published the name in his book Kakteen in Südamerika 1: 54 in 1979.

Etymology

- Cipocereus: the genus name comes from "Cipo" (which refers to Serra do Cipó National Park in Minas Gerais, where one of the species in this genus is found) and the Latin word cereus (meaning "candle"), which refers to the tall, straight form of these plants.
- pleurocarpus: the specific epithet is derived from the Greek terms pleuron (meaning "rib") and karpos (meaning "fruit"), referring to the grooved apprearance of this species' fruits.

== Conservation status ==
On the IUCN Red List, this species is classified as being Least Concern.

== Cultivation ==
Cipocereus pleurocarpus is mainly cultivated as an ornamental plant. It can be propagated vegetatively by cuttings, or by seeds.
