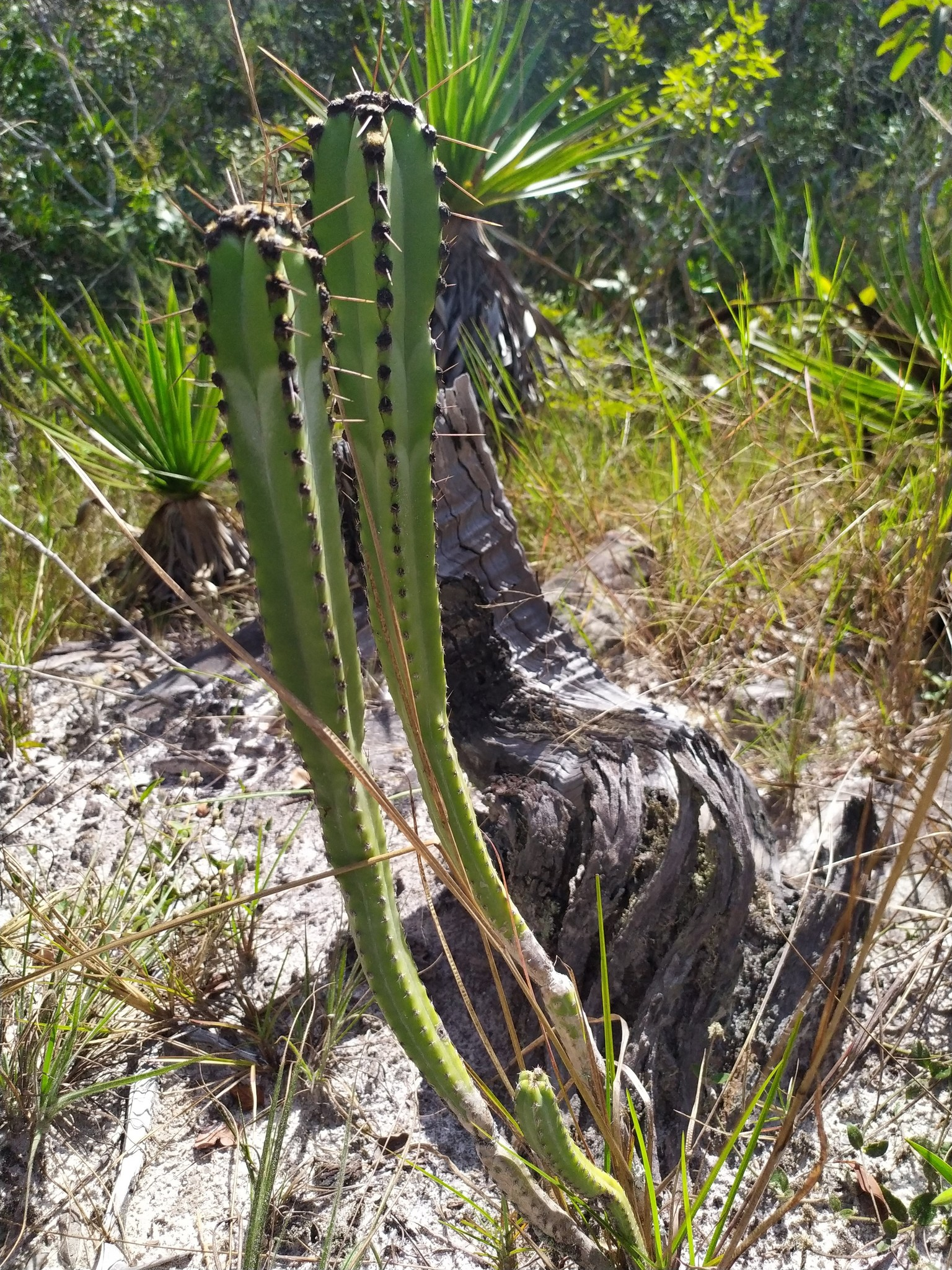

Conservation status
- Endangered (IUCN 3.1)

Scientific classification
- Kingdom: Plantae
- Clade: Tracheophytes
- Clade: Angiosperms
- Clade: Eudicots
- Order: Caryophyllales
- Family: Cactaceae
- Subfamily: Cactoideae
- Genus: Cipocereus
- Species: C. crassisepalus

Binomial name
- Cipocereus crassisepalus (Buining & Brederoo) Zappi & N.P.Taylor

Synonyms
- Cereus crassisepalus Buining & Brederoo 1973; Pilosocereus crassisepalus (Buining & Brederoo) Anceschi & Magli 2010; Piptanthocereus crassisepalus (Buining & Brederoo) F.Ritter 1979

= Cipocereus crassisepalus =

Species of cactus

Cipocereus crassisepalus is a species of cactus endemic to the state of Minas Gerais in Brazil.

== Description ==
Cipocereus crassisepalus grows tree-shaped, branches irregularly and reaches heights of up to 2 meters. The dark green, segmented shoots have a diameter of up to 6 centimeters. There are 4 to 6 blunt ribs that are thickened around the areoles. Thick, reddish-brown wool and bristly hair initially emerge from the round areoles, which later turn gray until the areoles are finally bald. The initially shiny reddish-brown thorns turn gray with a darker tip. The 1 to 2 central spines are directed upwards and up to 3 centimeters long. The approximately 3 marginal spines are spread out and are up to 2.5 centimeters long.

The flowers are 4 centimeters to 7.5 centimeters long in diameter. The pear-shaped fruits are yellowish white and tinged with purple.

== Distribution ==
Cipocereus crassisepalus is widespread in the Brazilian state of Minas Gerais in the Diamantina region.

== Taxonomy ==
The first description as Cereus crassisepalus was made in 1973 by Albert Frederik Hendrik Buining and Arnold J. Brederoo. The specific epithet crassisepalus is derived from the Latin words crassus for 'thick' and sepalum for 'sepal' and refers to the thick-fleshed outer perianth segments. Nigel Paul Taylor and Daniela Cristina Zappi (* 1965) placed the species in the genus Cipocereus in 1991. Further nomenclature synonyms are Piptanthocereus crassisepalus (Buining & Brederoo) F.Ritter (1979) and Pilosocereus crassisepalus (Buining & Brederoo) Anceschi & Magli (2010).
