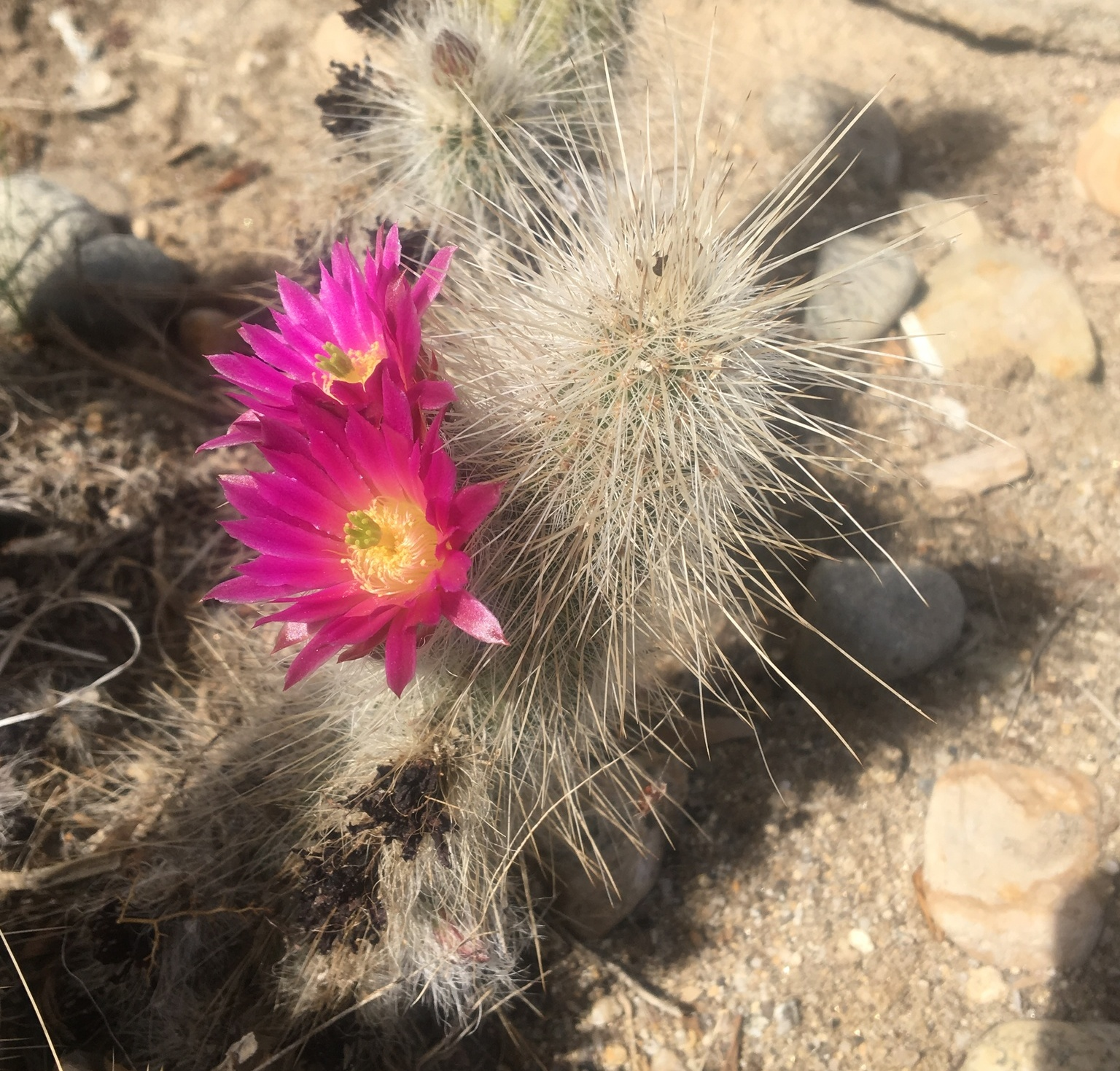

Conservation status
- Least Concern (IUCN 3.1)

Scientific classification
- Kingdom: Plantae
- Clade: Tracheophytes
- Clade: Angiosperms
- Clade: Eudicots
- Order: Caryophyllales
- Family: Cactaceae
- Subfamily: Cactoideae
- Genus: Echinocereus
- Species: E. rayonesensis

Binomial name
- Echinocereus rayonesensis N.P.Taylor, 1988

Synonyms
- Echinocereus parkeri subsp. rayonesensis (N.P.Taylor) D.Felix & W.Blum 2011

= Echinocereus rayonesensis =

Species of cactus

Echinocereus rayonesensis is a species of cactus native to Mexico.

== Description ==
Echinocereus rayonesensis grows with many shoots and branches at ground level. The upright, cylindrical shoots are 12 to 28 cm (4.7 to 11.0 in) long and have a diameter of 2.5 to 4.5 cm (0.98 to 1.77 in). They are hidden by the dense thorns. There are ten to 15 ribs that are tuberculated. The hair-like or slender thorns on them are glassy white to yellowish. The five to nine downward-facing central spines are 3 to 5 cm (1.2 to 2.0 in) long. The 15 to 25 radial spines, occasionally more, are 0.7 to 1.5 cm (0.28 to 0.59 in) long.

The broadly funnel-shaped flowers are somewhat purple-magenta in color and have a white throat. They appear on the sides of the shoots, are 2.5 to 6 cm (0.98 to 2.36 in) long and reach 2.8 to 6 cm (1.1 to 2.4 in) in diameter. The elongated fruits are olive green to brown.

== Distribution ==
Echinocereus rayonesensis is widespread in the Mexican state of Nuevo León in the Rayones Valley.

== Taxonomy ==
The first description by Nigel Paul Taylor was published in 1988. The specific epithet "rayonesensis" refers to the occurrence of the species in the Mexican Valley of Rayones.
