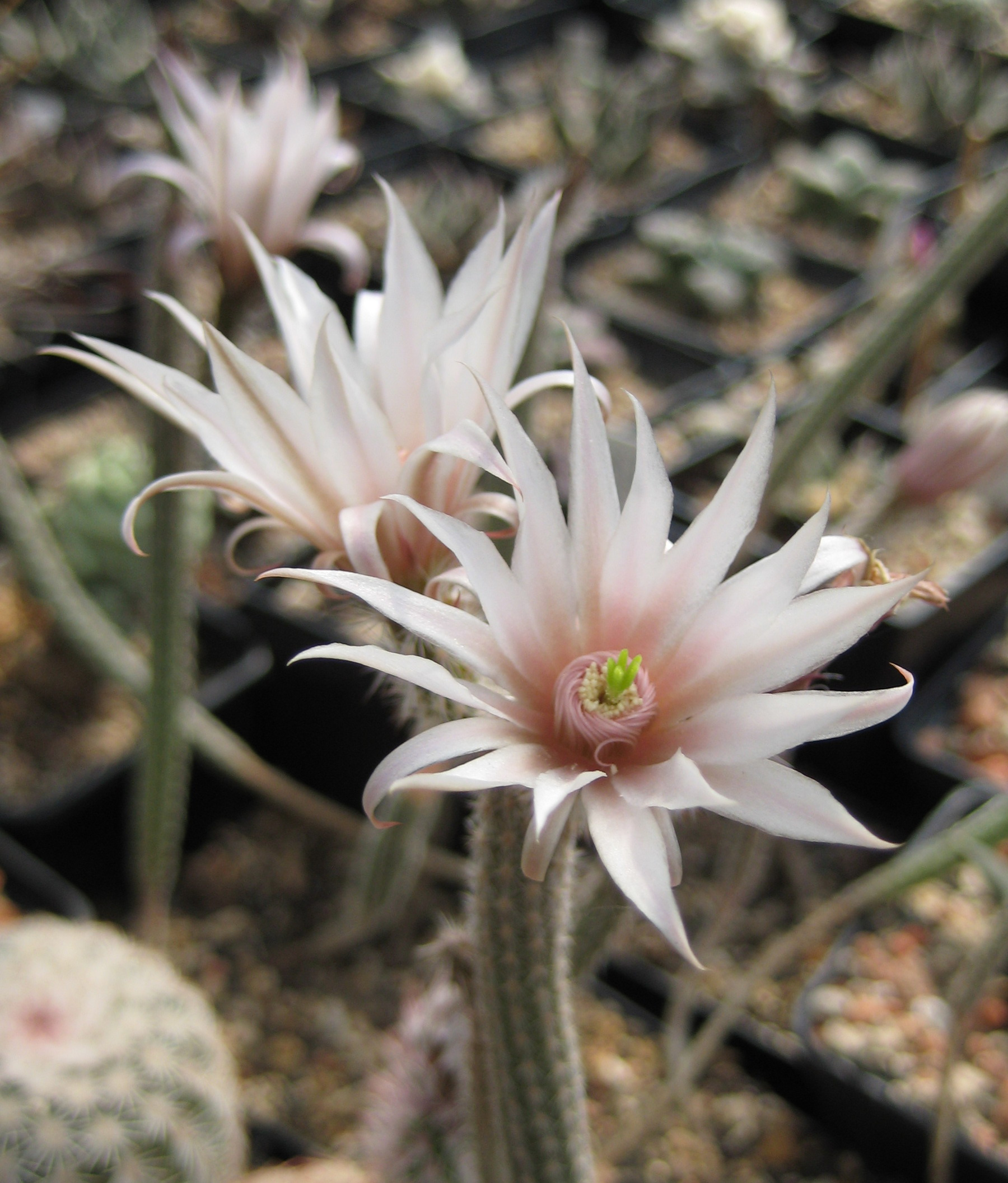

Conservation status
- Endangered (IUCN 3.1)

Scientific classification
- Kingdom: Plantae
- Clade: Tracheophytes
- Clade: Angiosperms
- Clade: Eudicots
- Order: Caryophyllales
- Family: Cactaceae
- Subfamily: Cactoideae
- Genus: Echinocereus
- Species: E. leucanthus

Binomial name
- Echinocereus leucanthus N.P.Taylor 1985

Synonyms
- Wilcoxia albiflora Backeb. 1952

= Echinocereus leucanthus =

Species of cactus

Echinocereus leucanthus is a species of cactus native to Mexico.

== Description ==
Echinocereus leucanthus branches out from the base and grows with cylindrical, slender light to dark green shoots that reach a diameter of 3 millimeters to 6 millimeters. The basally tapered shoots, which in the natural location are supported by adjacent vegetation, arise from a large tuberous root and grow up to 30 centimeters high. There are eight very low ribs. The 9 to 18 white radial spines are up to 1 millimeter long. 2 to 3, sometimes more, blackish central spines are formed per areole, which are less than 1 millimeter long. The funnel-like flowers that appear terminally or near the top of the shoot are white. They are 2 to 4 centimeters long and reach a diameter of up to 4 centimeters. The egg-shaped fruits are olive green in color and fragrant.

== Distribution ==
Echinocereus leucanthus is distributed at low altitudes in the Mexican states of Sinaloa and Sonora.

== Taxonomy ==
The first description as Wilcoxia albiflora was made in 1952 by Curt Backeberg. Nigel Paul Taylor placed the species in the genus Echinocereus in 1985. The specific epithet leucanthus is derived from the Greek words leukos for 'white' and anthos for 'flower'.
