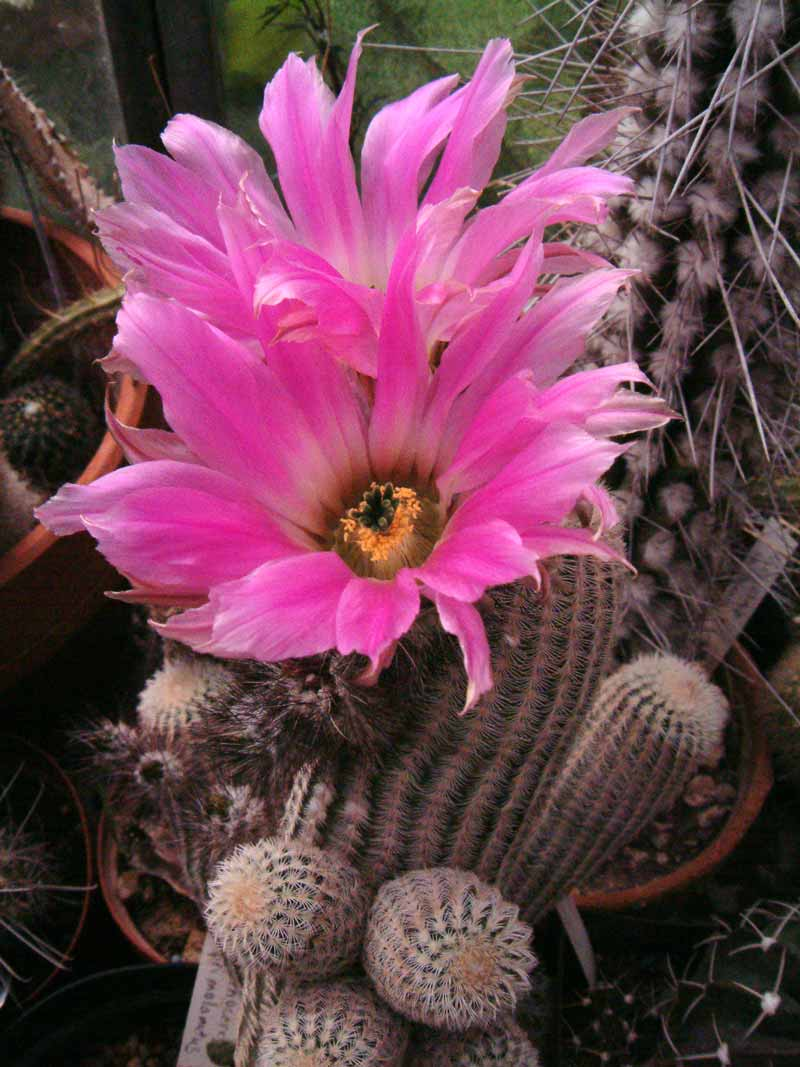

Conservation status
- Least Concern (IUCN 3.1)

Scientific classification
- Kingdom: Plantae
- Clade: Tracheophytes
- Clade: Angiosperms
- Clade: Eudicots
- Order: Caryophyllales
- Family: Cactaceae
- Subfamily: Cactoideae
- Genus: Echinocereus
- Species: E. primolanatus

Binomial name
- Echinocereus primolanatus Fritz Schwarz ex N.P.Taylor 1985

= Echinocereus primolanatus =

Species of cactus

Echinocereus primolanatus is a species of cactus native to Mexico.

== Description ==
Echinocereus primolanatus typically grows singly with occasionally enlarged roots. The green shoots are spherical to cylindrical, 4 to 12 centimeters long, and 2.5 to 5.5 centimeters in diameter, covered in thorns. There are 16 to 26 slightly tuberculated ribs. Young shoots have 1 to 3 hair-like, brownish central thorns up to 1.5 centimeters long. The 20 to 28 dirty white radial spines, arranged in two comb-like rows, are up to 0.4 centimeters long. The broad, funnel-shaped flowers are bright pink, 5.5 to 9 centimeters long, and 5 to 9 centimeters in diameter, appearing near the shoot tips from very woolly buds. The egg-shaped fruits are almost dry, tear lengthwise, and are covered with dense wool and spines.

== Distribution ==
Echinocereus primolanatus is found in the Mexican state of Coahuila on the edge of the Sierra de la Paila growing on exposed slopes and xerophytic scrub at elevations between 1200 and 1600 meters.

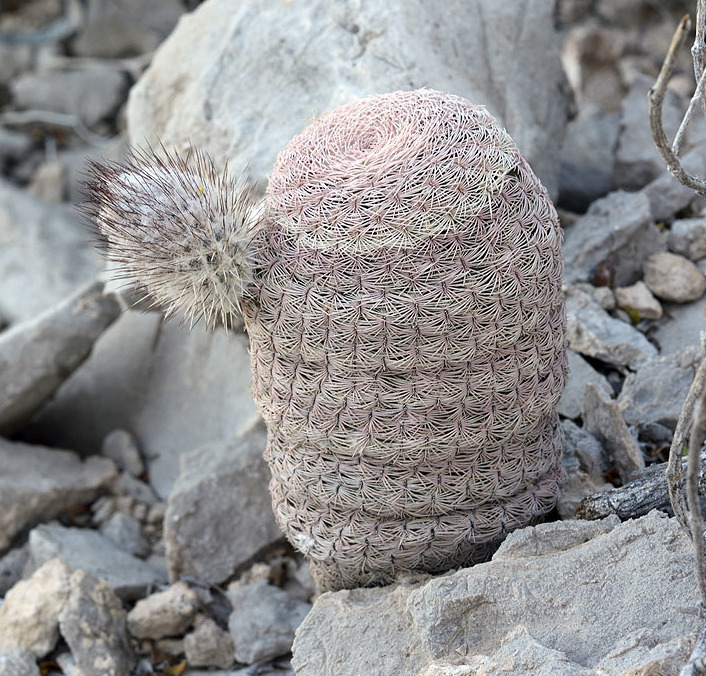
Habitat in Cuatrociénegas Municipality, Coahuila, Mexico

== Taxonomy ==
The first description of the plant was made by Nigel Paul Taylor in 1985. The specific epithet primolanatus is derived from the Latin words primus for 'first' and lanatus for 'woolly' and refers to the striking white spines of the species.
