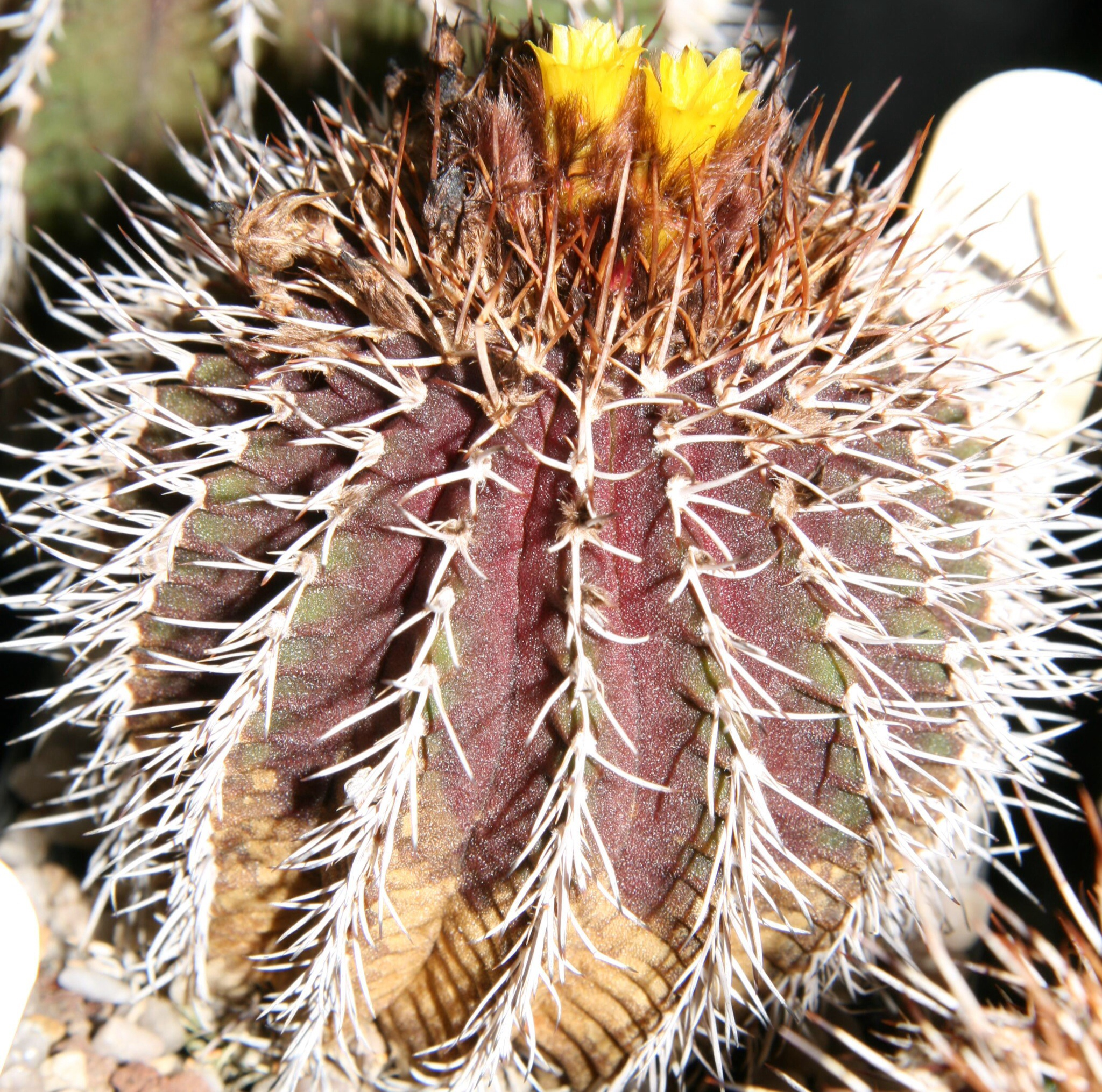

Conservation status
- Critically Endangered (IUCN 3.1)
- CITES Appendix I

Scientific classification
- Kingdom: Plantae
- Clade: Tracheophytes
- Clade: Angiosperms
- Clade: Eudicots
- Order: Caryophyllales
- Family: Cactaceae
- Subfamily: Cactoideae
- Genus: Uebelmannia
- Species: U. buiningii

Binomial name
- Uebelmannia buiningii Donald

= Uebelmannia buiningii =

Species of cactus

Uebelmannia buiningii is a species of plant in the family Cactaceae. It is endemic to Brazil. Its natural habitat is dry savanna. It is threatened by habitat loss.

== Description ==
Uebelmannia buiningii grows with greenish to reddish brown, spherical to short cylindrical bodies that reach diameters of up to 8 centimeters. The epidermis is rough due to wax deposits. The 18 straight ribs are spaced 15 millimeters apart. They are divided into about 5 millimeters distant downward cusps. The areoles are covered with a little wool. The 4 middle spines are crossed. The 2 to 4 straight edge spines are up to 5 mm long and shorter than the middle spines.

The yellow flowers are up to 2.7 inches long and reach a diameter of 2 centimeters. The egg-shaped fruits are yellow and have diameters of up to 4 millimeters.

== Distribution ==
Uebelmannia buiningii is widespread in the Brazilian state of Minas Gerais in the Serra Negra and grows on quartz grit.

== Taxonomy ==
The first description was made in 1968 by John Donald Donald. The specific epithet buiningii honors the Dutch cactus lover and specialist in Brazilian cacti Albert Frederik Hendrik Buining.
