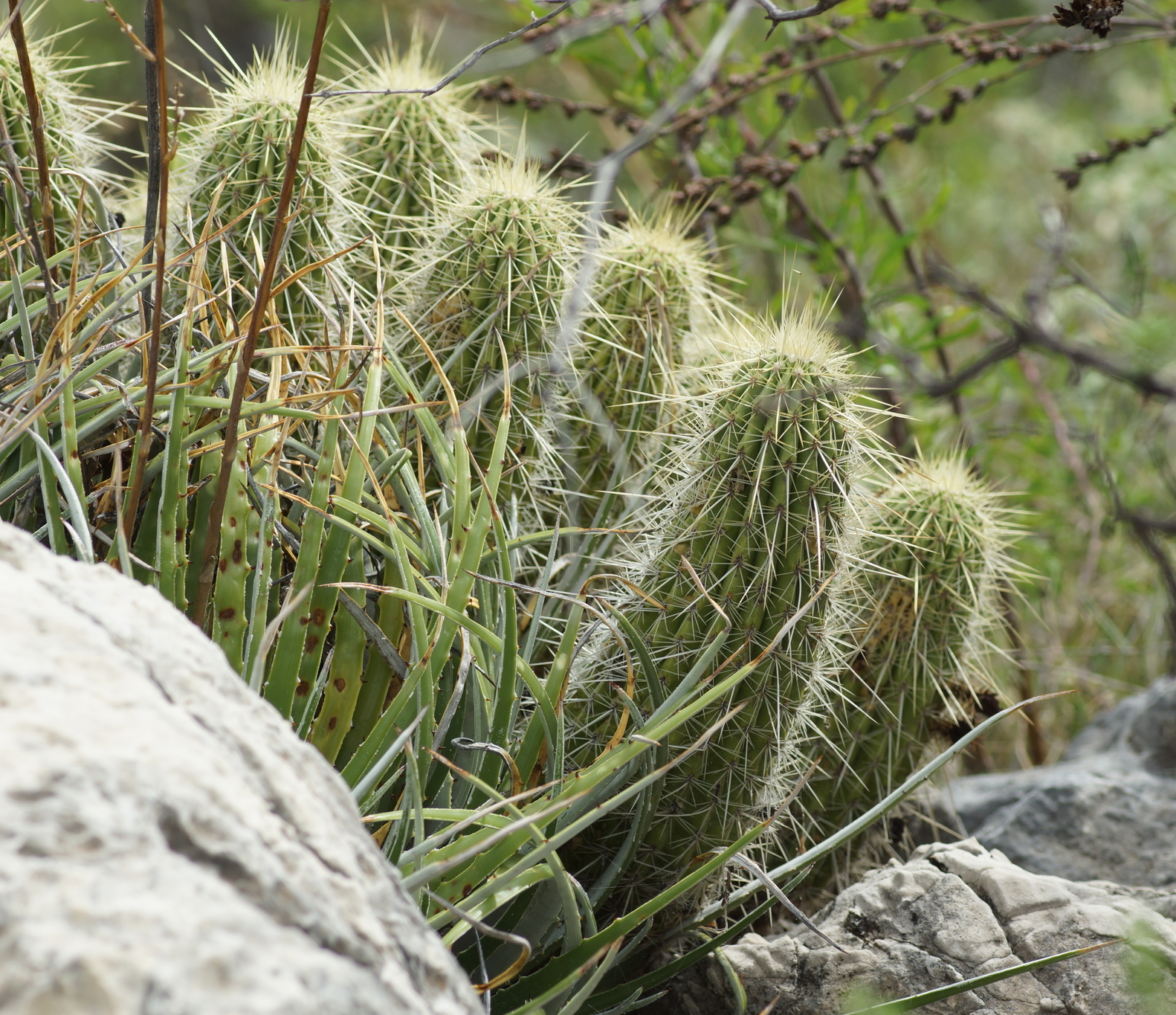

Scientific classification
- Kingdom: Plantae
- Clade: Tracheophytes
- Clade: Angiosperms
- Clade: Eudicots
- Order: Caryophyllales
- Family: Cactaceae
- Subfamily: Cactoideae
- Genus: Echinocereus
- Species: E. occidentalis

Binomial name
- Echinocereus occidentalis (N.P.Taylor) W.Rischer, S.Breckw. & Breckw., 2009 publ. 2008

Synonyms
- Echinocereus stramineus subsp. occidentalis (N.P.Taylor) N.P.Taylor 1997; Echinocereus stramineus var. occidentalis N.P.Taylor 1988

= Echinocereus occidentalis =

Species of cactus

Echinocereus occidentalis is a species of cactus native to Mexico.

== Description ==
Echinocereus occidentalis stems form clumps, are cylindrical and erect, light green, and measure up to 60 cm (24 in) in diameter and 30 cm (12 in) in height. The stems have 12-19 ribs. The spines are whitish-yellow with dark tips. There are 9-13 radial spines, each 15–20 mm (0.59–0.79 in) long, and 1-5 central spines, each 40–55 mm (1.6–2.2 in) long. The flowers are magenta with a light center, measuring 50–70 mm (2.0–2.8 in) in both length and width. The fruits are round, pinkish-red, 30 mm (1.2 in) in diameter, with white to pink pulp and black seeds.

=== Subspecies ===
There are two recognized subspecies:

Image	Scientific name	Distribution
	Echinocereus occidentalis subsp. breckwoldtiorum De-Nova, Cast.-Lara & W.Blum	Mexico (SW. Coahuila, N. Zacatecas)
	Echinocereus occidentalis subsp. occidentalis	Mexico (E. Central Durango)

== Distribution ==
Plants are found growing in south-western Coahuila, central to eastern Durango, and northern Zacatecas at elevations of 800–1,800 m (2,600–5,900 ft). Plants grow in limestone soil in desert shrub.

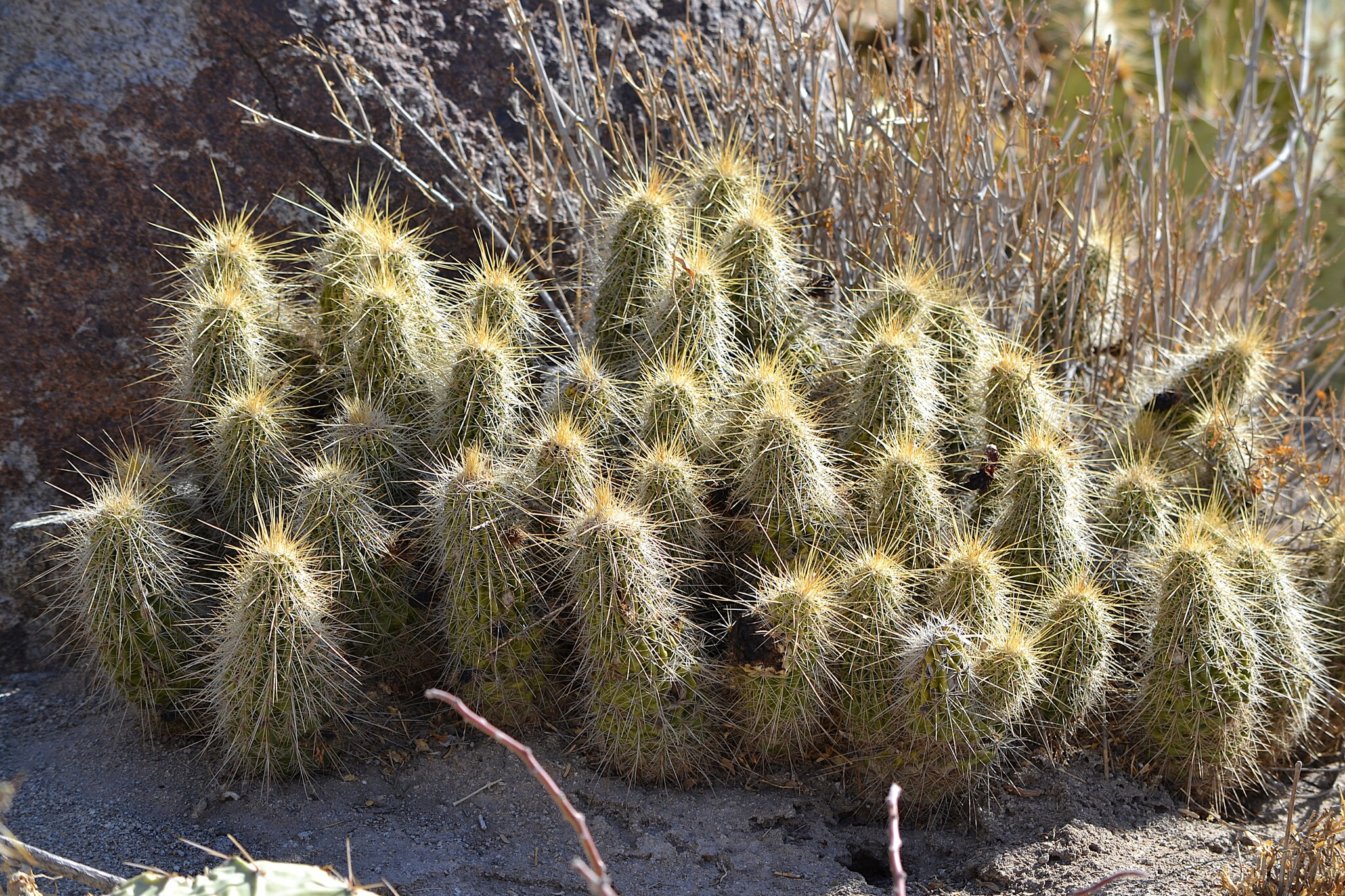
Habitat in Dinamita, Durango, Mexico

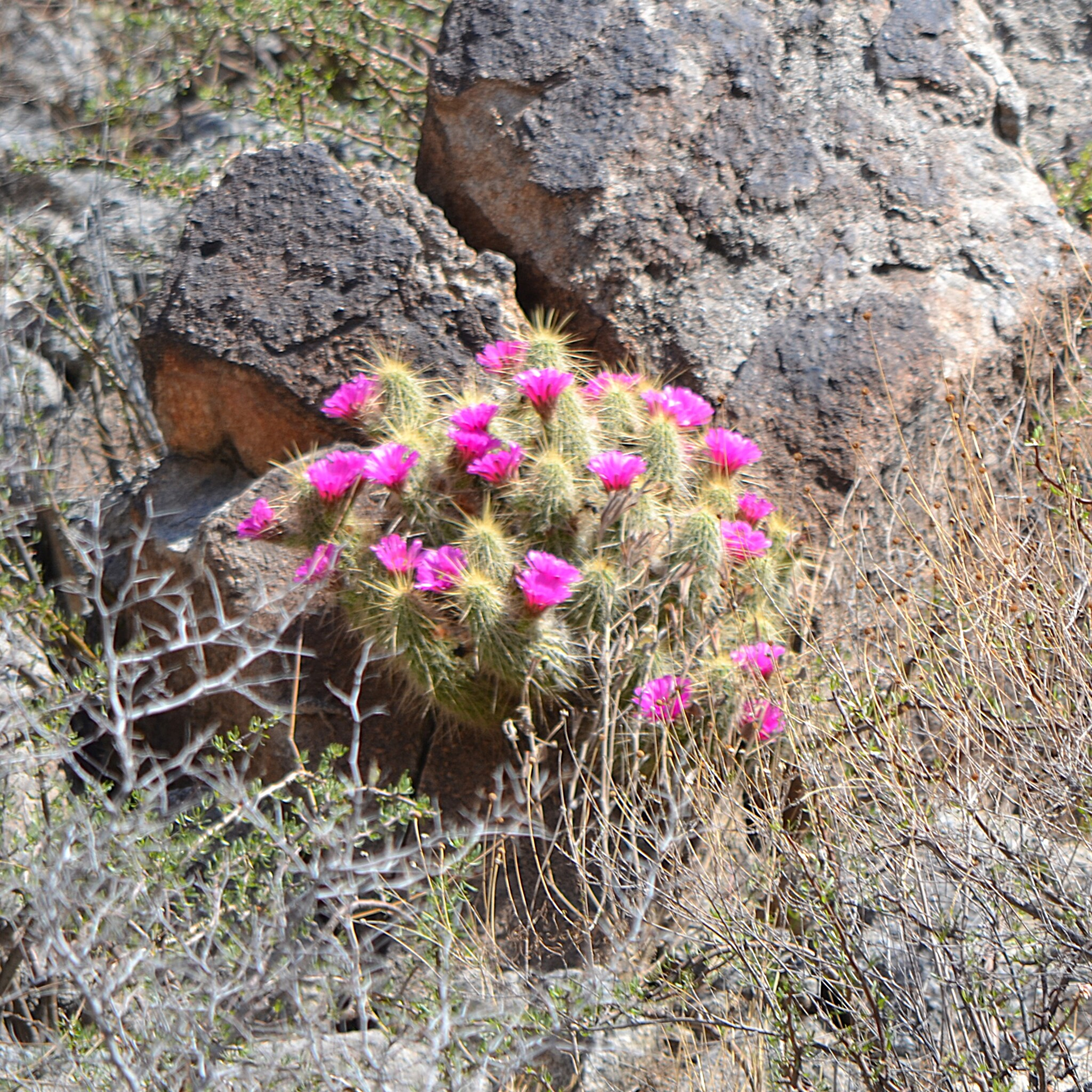
Habitat in La Mina, Durango, Mexico
