= Magliani =

Magliani is an Italian surname. Notable people with the surname include:

- Agostino Magliani (1824–1891), Italian financier
- Francesca Magliani (1845–?), Italian painter

== See also ==
- Magli (surname)
