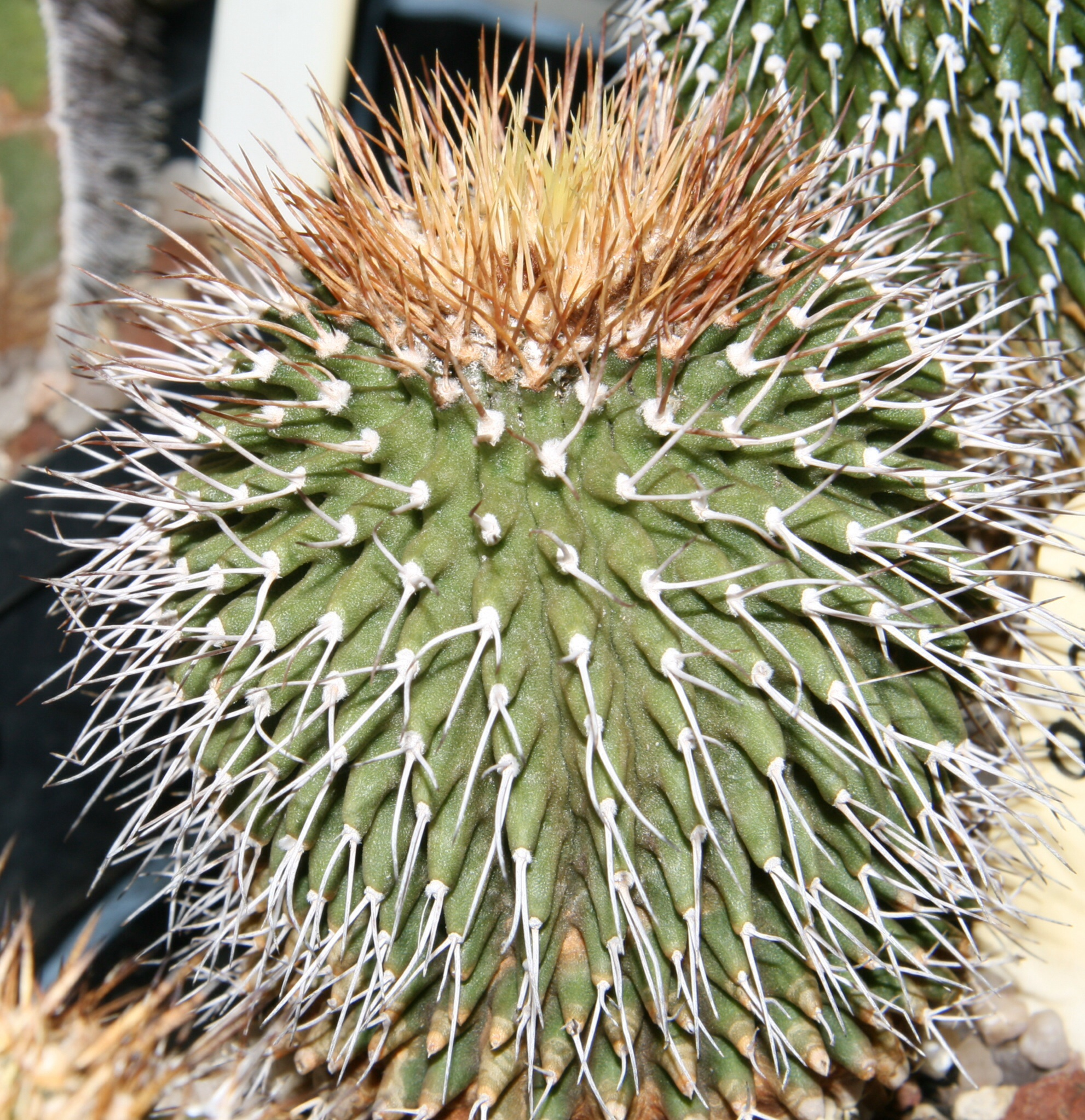

Conservation status
- Endangered (IUCN 3.1)
- CITES Appendix I

Scientific classification
- Kingdom: Plantae
- Clade: Tracheophytes
- Clade: Angiosperms
- Clade: Eudicots
- Order: Caryophyllales
- Family: Cactaceae
- Subfamily: Cactoideae
- Genus: Uebelmannia
- Species: U. gummifera

Binomial name
- Uebelmannia gummifera (Backeb. & Voll) Buining

Subspecies
- Uebelmannia gummifera subsp. gummifera; Uebelmannia gummifera subsp. meninensis (Buining) P.J.Braun & Esteves

Synonyms
- Parodia gummifera Backeb. & Voll

= Uebelmannia gummifera =

Species of cactus

Uebelmannia gummifera is a species of plant in the family Cactaceae. It is succulent cactus subshrub endemic to southeastern Brazil. Its natural habitat is dry savanna. It is threatened by habitat loss.

== Description ==
Uebelmannia gummifera grows with spherical to slightly elongated bodies that reach heights of up to 10 centimeters and diameters of up to 6 centimeters. In rare cases, short columnar specimens up to 40 centimeters high have been found. There are noticeable mucous ducts under the somewhat rough epidermis. The approximately 32 narrow ribs are initially tuberous. The areoles on it are grayish white. The single, gray central spine is straight and directed slightly downwards. One of the three marginal spines, which are up to 5 millimeters long, is directed slightly downwards.

The bright yellow flowers are up to 2 centimeters long and reach a diameter of 1.5 centimeters. The yellowish green fruits are up to 8 millimeters long and have a diameter of up to 6 millimeters.

== Distribution ==
Uebelmannia gummifera is widespread in the Brazilian state of Minas Gerais in the Serra de Ambrosia and grows on quartz grit.

== Subspecies ==
Two subspecies are accepted:

- Uebelmannia gummifera subsp. gummifera
- Uebelmannia gummifera subsp. meninensis (Buining) P.J.Braun & Esteves

== Taxonomy ==
The first description as Parodia gummifera was made in 1949 by Curt Backeberg and Otto Voll. The specific epithet gummifer is derived from the Latin words gumma for 'rubber' and -fer for '-bearing'. In 1967 Albert Frederik Hendrik Buining placed the species in the genus Uebelmannia.
