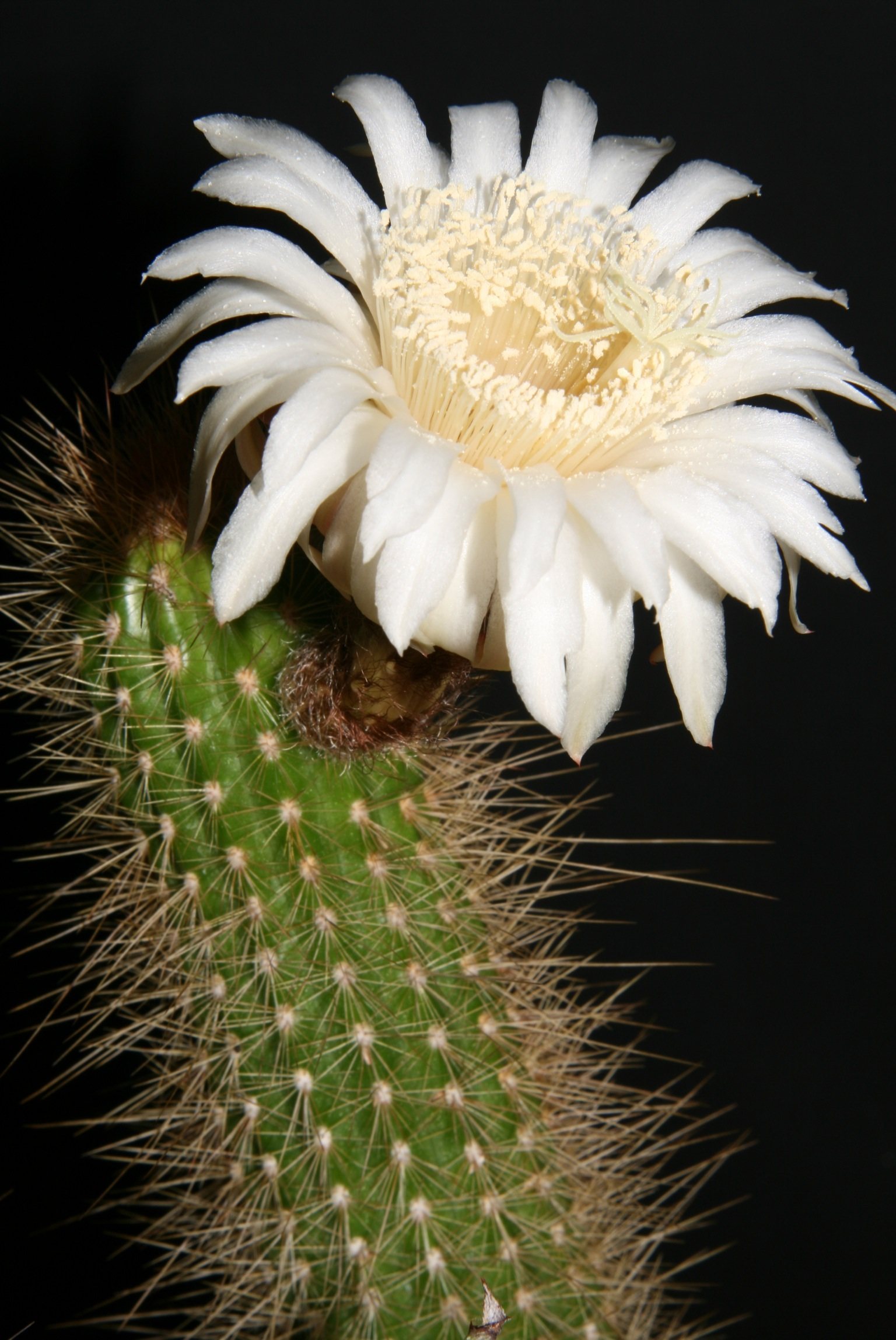

Conservation status
- Least Concern (IUCN 3.1)

Scientific classification
- Kingdom: Plantae
- Clade: Tracheophytes
- Clade: Angiosperms
- Clade: Eudicots
- Order: Caryophyllales
- Family: Cactaceae
- Subfamily: Cactoideae
- Genus: Arthrocereus
- Species: A. spinosissimus

Binomial name
- Arthrocereus spinosissimus (Buining & Brederoo) F. Ritter 1979

Synonyms
- Eriocereus spinosissimus Buining & Brederoo

= Arthrocereus spinosissimus =

Species of cactus

Arthrocereus spinosissimus is a species of cactus in the subfamily Cactoideae from Brazil.

== Description ==
Arthrocereus spinosissimus grows upright with basally branching shoots. The up to one meter long, green to bright green shoots reach a diameter of 5 to 6 cm (2.0 to 2.4 in). The 16 (or more) ribs are 4 to 5 mm (0.16 to 0.20 in) high. Numerous, thin, yellowish thorns emerge from the closely spaced areoles. There are 6 to 8 central spines that are usually 2 to 2.8 cm (0.79 to 1.10 in), occasionally up to 4.5 cm (1.8 in) in length, and about 20 radial spines of 0.7 to 0.8 cm (0.28 to 0.31 in) in length. The white flowers are between 6 and 7 cm (2.4 and 2.8 in) long, the fruits between 2.5 and 3 cm (0.98 and 1.18 in).

== Distribution ==
Arthrocereus spinosissimus is restricted to the Chapada dos Guimarães National Park in the Brazilian state of Mato Grosso at altitudes of 800 to 900 meters.

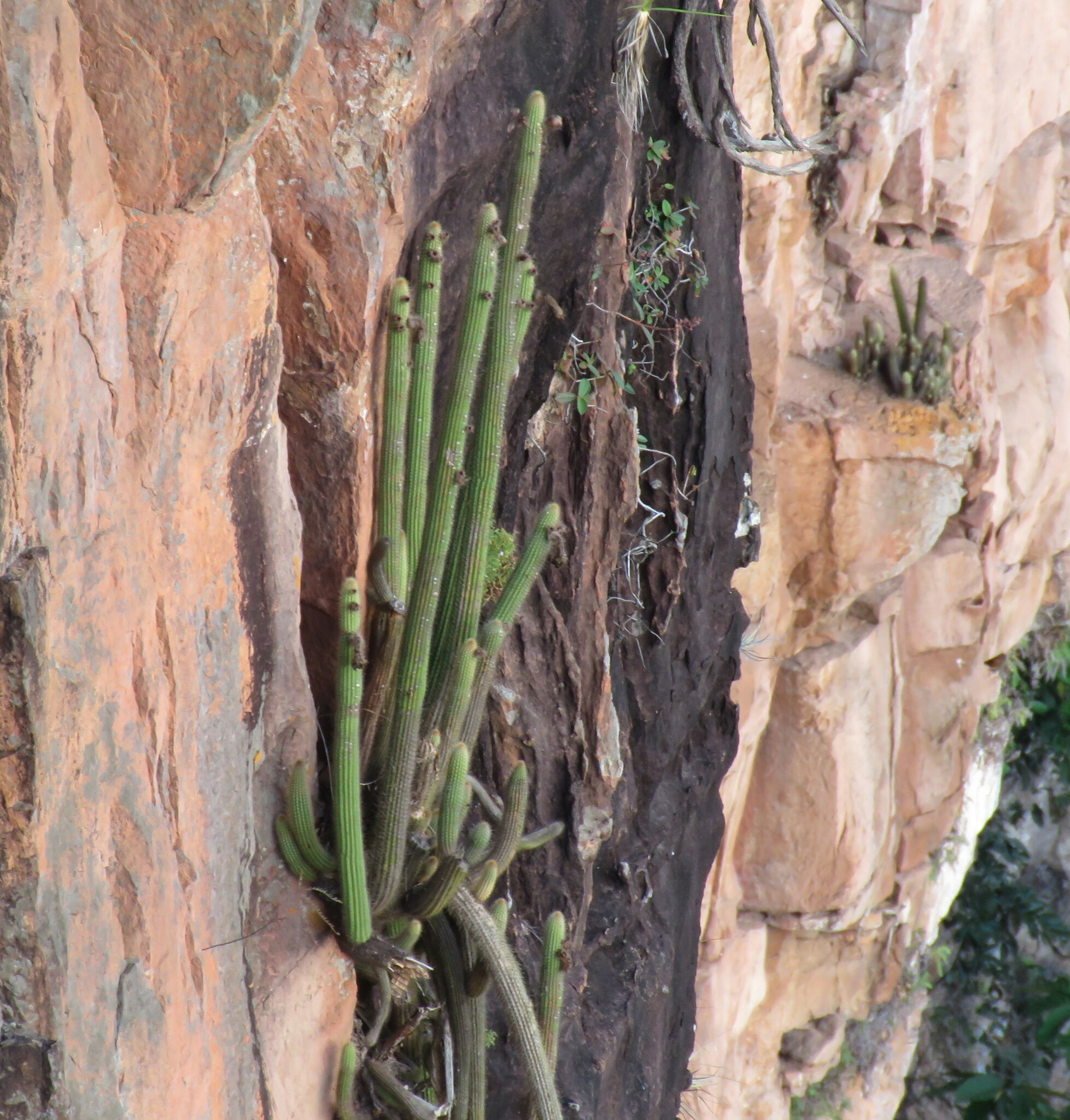
Habitat in Coxipó do Ouro, Cuiabá - State of Mato Grosso, Brazil

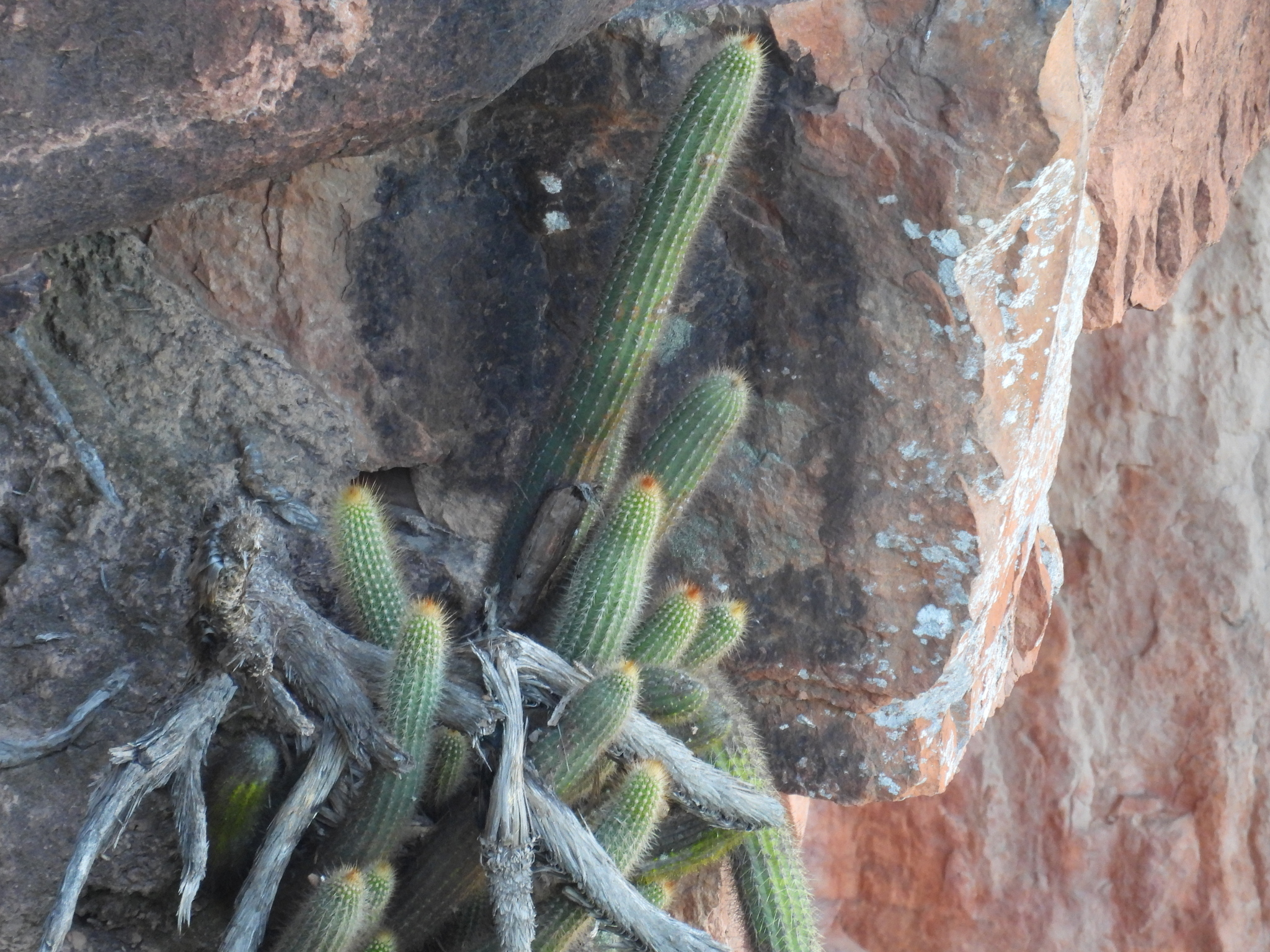

== Taxonomy ==
The first description as Eriocereus spinosissimus by Albert Frederik Hendrik Buining and Arnold J. Brederoo was published in 1977 from Buining's estate. The specific epithet spinosissimus is derived from the superlative of the Latin adjective spinosus for 'thorny'. Friedrich Ritter placed the species in the genus Arthrocereus in 1979.
