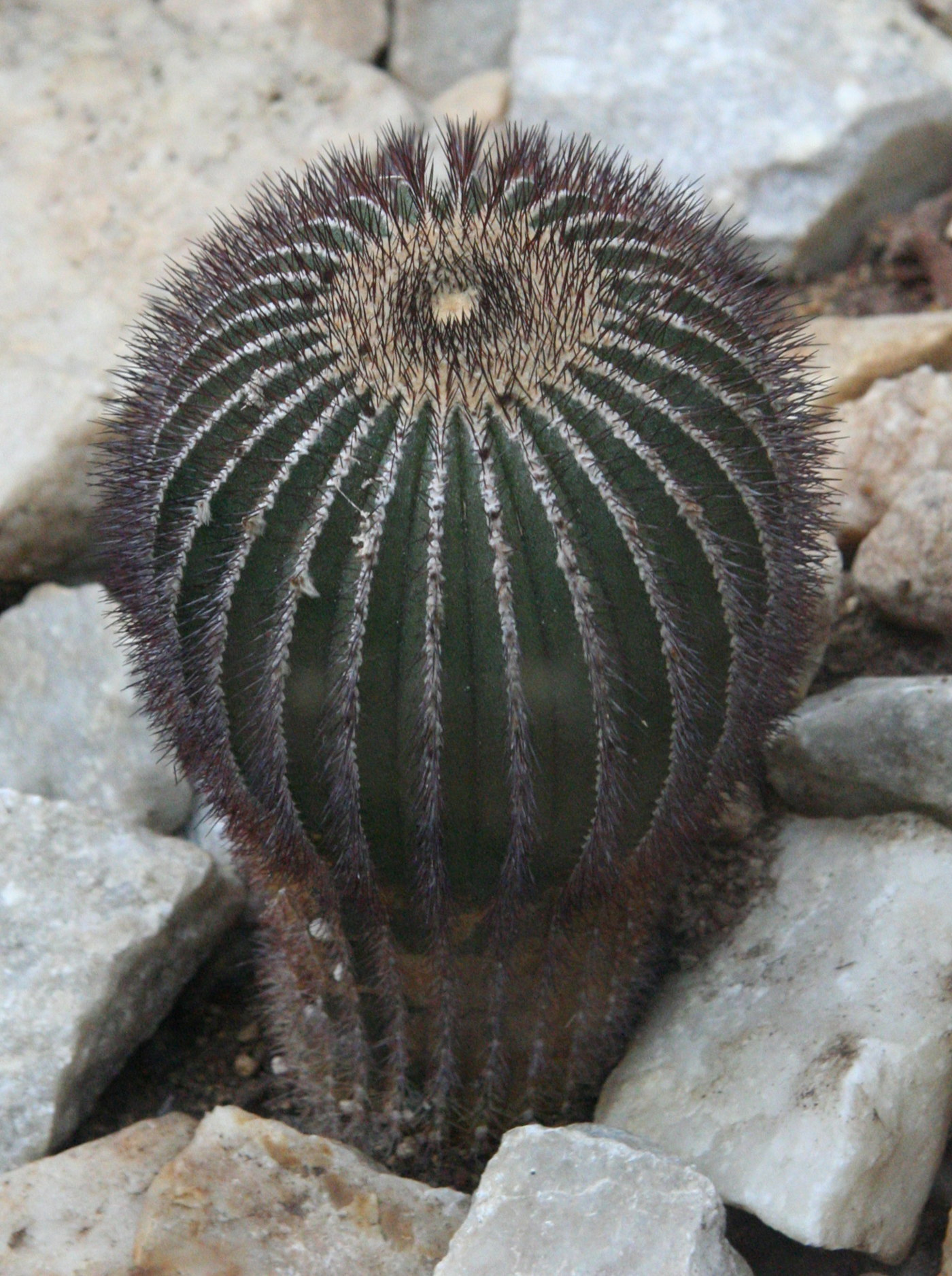

Conservation status
- Endangered (IUCN 3.1)
- CITES Appendix I

Scientific classification
- Kingdom: Plantae
- Clade: Tracheophytes
- Clade: Angiosperms
- Clade: Eudicots
- Order: Caryophyllales
- Family: Cactaceae
- Subfamily: Cactoideae
- Genus: Uebelmannia
- Species: U. pectinifera

Binomial name
- Uebelmannia pectinifera Buining

= Uebelmannia pectinifera =

Species of cactus

Uebelmannia pectinifera is a species of plant in the family Cactaceae. It is a succulent cactus subshrub endemic to Minas Gerais state in southeastern Brazil. Its natural habitats are dry savanna and rocky areas. It is threatened by habitat loss.

== Description ==
Uebelmannia pectinifer is a solitary and globular species, becoming columnar with age, grows with dark reddish-brown to grayish, more or less cylindrical bodies that reach heights of growth of up to 100 centimeters and a diameter of up to 15 centimeters. The epidermis usually appears granular and is covered with waxy white scales. The 15 to 40 ribs are sharp-edged. The brownish to gray felty areoles on it are very close together. The 1 to 4 brown to almost black spines are protruding, often intertwine and then form a "comb". They are up to 2 centimeters long.

The slender, funnel-shaped, light yellow flowers that bloom diurnal in the summer, up to 1.5 centimeters long and reach a diameter of 1 centimeter. The pear-shaped to cylindrical fruits are purple-red and 1.5 to 2.5 centimeters long, the seeds are small and black.

== Subspecies ==
Accepted subspecies:

Image	Subspecies	Description	Distribution
	Uebelmannia pectinifera subsp. pectinifera	0.5 m in height for about 18 ribs, found in high montane dry savanna around 1,000 meters	Brazil (Minas Gerais)
	Uebelmannia pectinifera subsp. flavispina (Buining & Brederoo) P.J.Braun & Esteves	0.35 m high and up to 20 ribs	SE. Brazil (west of Diamantina, Minas Gerais)
	Uebelmannia pectinifera subsp. horrida (P.J.Braun) P.J.Braun & Esteves	1 m high, from 23 to 40 ribs	SE. Brazil (Serra do Espinhaço)
	Uebelmannia pectinifera subsp. eriocactoides (Řepka, Krajča & V.Toman) Guiggi	Tall upright habit, gold spines, 18-25 ribs, elevation of 700–1100 m	Brazil (Minas Gerais)

== Distribution ==
Uebelmannia pectinifera is widespread in the Brazilian state of Minas Gerais and grows on sandstones containing quartzite growing in rock pockets in dry savanna at elevations of 650 to 1350 meters.

== Taxonomy ==
The first description was made in 1967 by Albert Frederik Hendrik Buining. The specific epithet pectinifera is derived from the Latin words pecten for 'comb' and -fer for '-bearing' and refers to the comb-like spines of the species.
