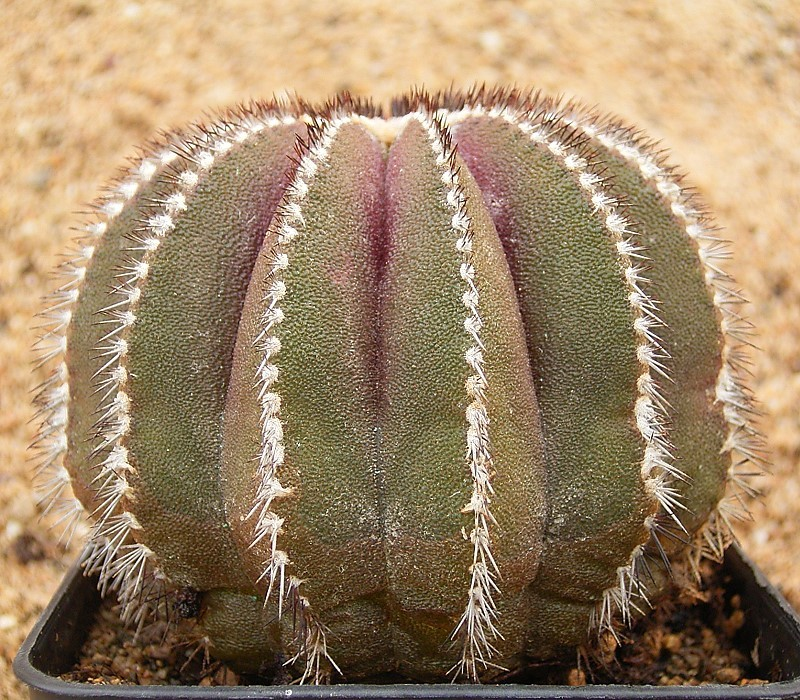
- Uebelmannia pectinifera

Scientific classification
- Kingdom: Plantae
- Clade: Embryophytes
- Clade: Tracheophytes
- Clade: Angiosperms
- Clade: Eudicots
- Order: Caryophyllales
- Family: Cactaceae
- Subfamily: Cactoideae
- Tribe: Cereeae
- Subtribe: Uebelmanniinae
- Genus: Uebelmannia; Buining

Type species
- Uebelmannia gummifera

Species
- See text.

= Uebelmannia =

Genus of cacti

Uebelmannia is genus of cacti, native to southeast Brazil. In a 2023 classification of the tribe Cereeae, it was placed as the only genus in the subtribe Uebelmanniinae, having formerly been placed in the subtribe Rebutiinae.

== Description ==
Plants in the genus Uebelmannia, individual plants grow without branching and form spherical to cylindrical shoots that can reach heights of up to 75 centimeters (30 in). The plant's surface can be smooth, papillate, granular, or covered with waxy deposits. Most plants have sharp-edged ribs, although some may have ribs that are divided into bumps. Each plant has two to seven spines that emerge from the areoles, which are arranged in a protruding, spreading, or comb-like pattern. These spines can be straight or slightly curved.

The small, short, funnel-shaped flowers of Uebelmannia are yellow and typically bloom near the tip of the shoot during the day. The flower tubes are covered with a few areoles, from which dense wool and a few bristles emerge.

The fruits of Uebelmannia are spherical to cylindrical, yellow or red in color, and resemble berries. They are bare at the base but covered with wool and bristles towards the top. When ripe, the fruits are thin-walled and dry, with no remnants of the flowers. Inside the fruits are cap-shaped, shiny black to reddish-brown seeds.

== Phylogeny ==
In 2023, a study was conducted and showed the phylogeny of the genus Uebelmannia.

- Uebelmannia pectinifera
- - Uebelmannia buiningii
  - Uebelmannia gummifera

== Species ==
It was named after the Swiss collector Werner J. Uebelmann (1921-2014). As of December 2025, Plants of the World Online accepted four species:

Image	Scientific name	Distribution
	Uebelmannia buiningii	Brazil
	Uebelmannia gummifera	Brazil
	Uebelmannia pectinifera	Brazil
	Uebelmannia nuda	Brazil
