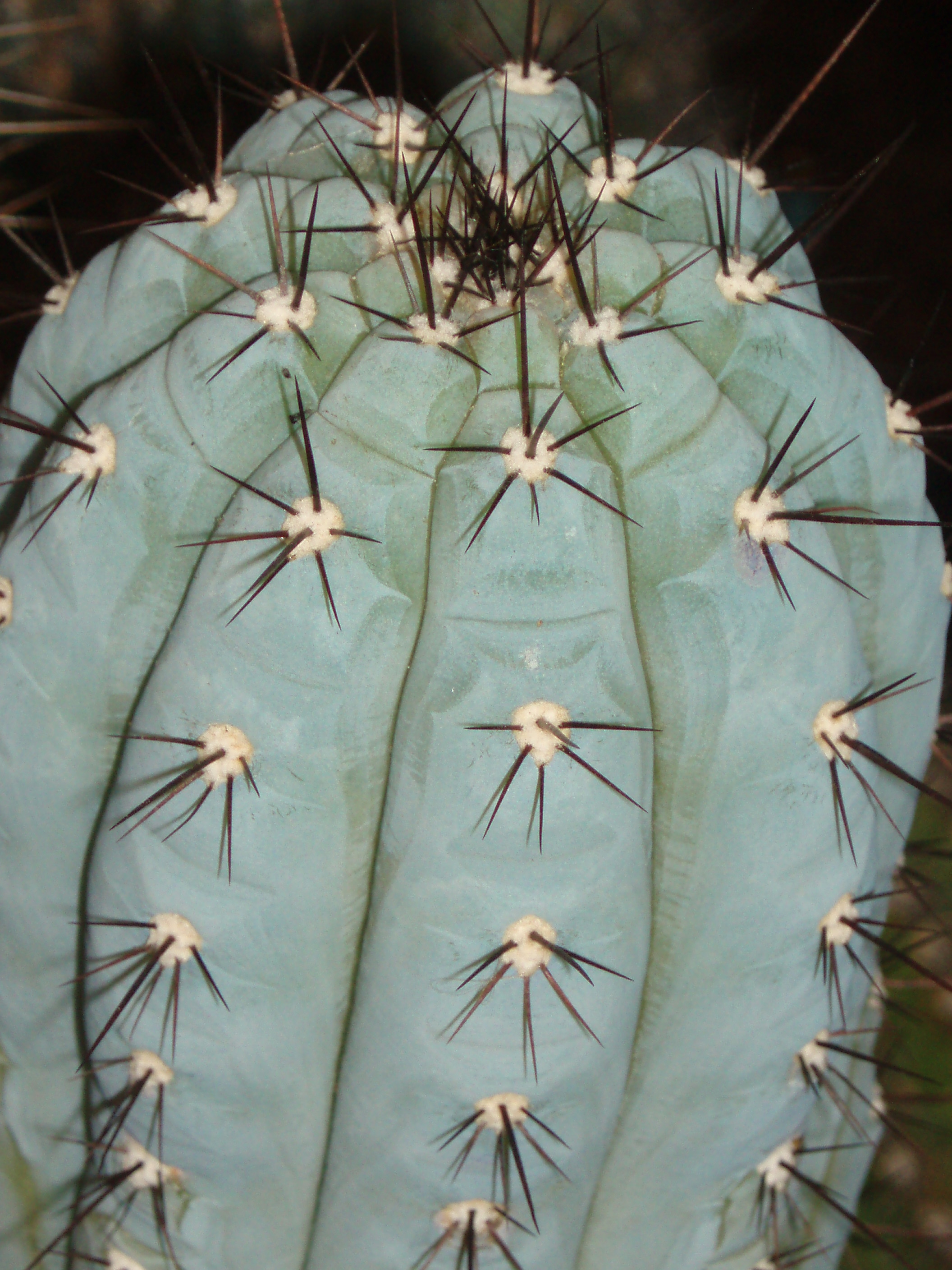

Conservation status
- Vulnerable (IUCN 3.1)

Scientific classification
- Kingdom: Plantae
- Clade: Tracheophytes
- Clade: Angiosperms
- Clade: Eudicots
- Order: Caryophyllales
- Family: Cactaceae
- Subfamily: Cactoideae
- Genus: Cipocereus
- Species: C. bradei

Binomial name
- Cipocereus bradei (Backeb. & Voll) Zappi & N.P.Taylor

Synonyms
- Cephalocereus bradei (Backeb. & Voll) Borg 1951; Cereus bradei (Backeb. & Voll) Anceschi & Magli 2021; Pilocereus bradei Backeb. & Voll 1942; Pilosocereus bradei (Backeb. & Voll) Byles & G.D.Rowley 1957; Pseudopilocereus bradei (Backeb. & Voll) Buxb. 1968

= Cipocereus bradei =

Species of cactus

Cipocereus bradei is a species of cactus. It is endemic to the state of Minas Gerais in Brazil. It is threatened by habitat loss.

== Description ==
Cipocereus bradei grows with branched shoots that reach a height of up to 3.5 meters and a diameter of 8 to 9 centimeters. The initially blue shoots are later greyish blue. There are 8 to 9 slightly arched ribs, about 1 centimeter high and up to 2.5 centimeters wide, which are sharply furrowed between the oval, almost bald areoles. The thorns are variable and are often completely absent on older shoots. The 1 to 2 stinging, black central spines point downwards or upwards and are up to 3.5 centimeters long. The 4 to 5 radial spines are brownish and have a length of up to 1.5 centimeters.

The flowers are up to 7.5 centimeters long. The pericarp and the flower tube are frosted blue. The spherical fruits with a deep blue frosting are smooth and glabrous. They have a diameter of up to 5.5 centimeters and brown seeds.

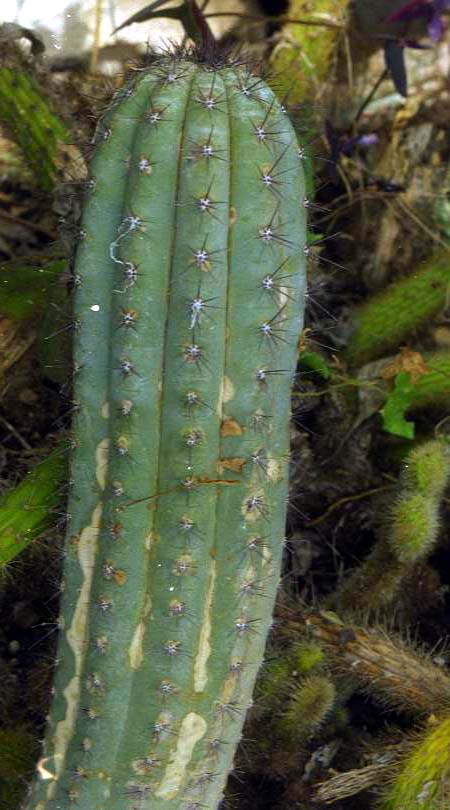
Plant

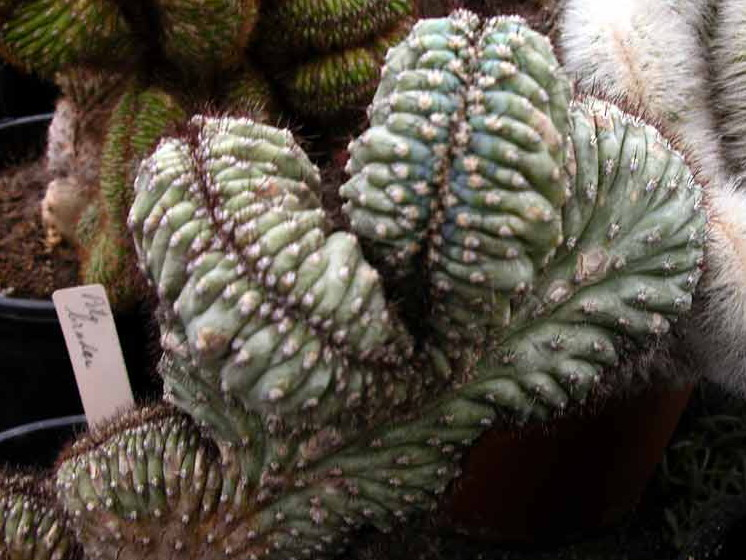
Crested plant

== Distribution ==
Cipocereus bradei is commonly found in the Diamantina region of Minas Gerais, Brazil in Serra do Cabral and west slope of Serra do Espinhaço at elevations between 500 and 1,200 meters. Plants are found growing along with Arthrocereus rondonianus, Pilosocereus aurisetus, and Discocactus placentiformis.

== Taxonomy ==
Originally described as Pilocereus bradei in 1942 by Curt Backeberg and Otto Voll, the specific epithet honors German botanist Alexander Curt Brade, who worked at the Rio de Janeiro Botanical Garden. In 1991, Nigel Paul Taylor and Daniela Cristina Zappi reclassified the species into the genus Cipocereus.
