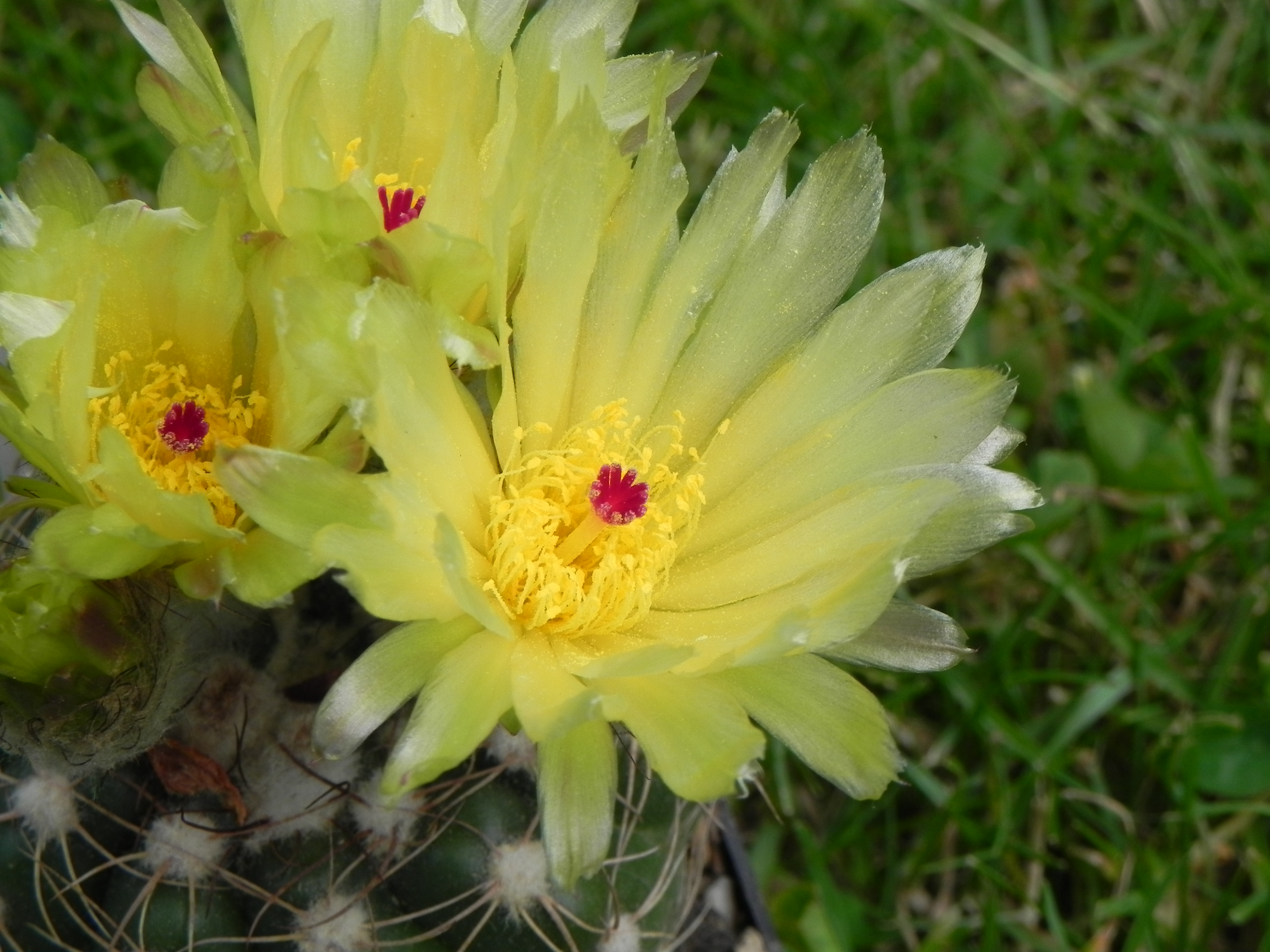
- Yellow-flowered morph
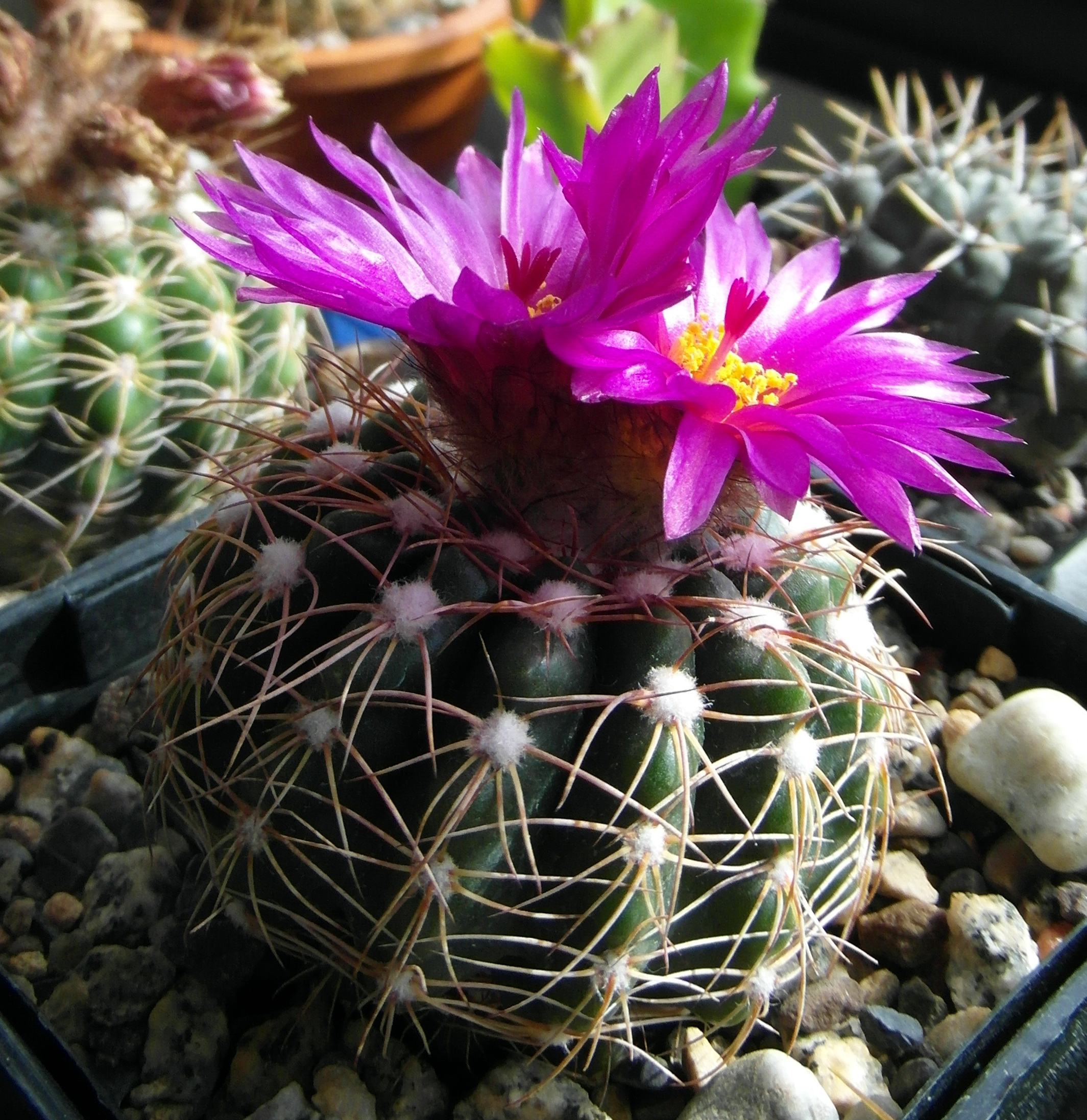
- Purple-flowered morph

Scientific classification
- Kingdom: Plantae
- Clade: Embryophytes
- Clade: Tracheophytes
- Clade: Angiosperms
- Clade: Eudicots
- Order: Caryophyllales
- Family: Cactaceae
- Subfamily: Cactoideae
- Genus: Parodia
- Species: P. crassigibba

Binomial name
- Parodia crassigibba (F.Ritter) N.P.Taylor

Synonyms
- List: Notocactus arachnitis F.Ritter; Notocactus arachnitis f. darilhoensis N.Gerloff; Notocactus arachnitis var. minor F.Ritter; Notocactus arachnitis f. minor (F.Ritter) N.Gerloff & Neduchal; Notocactus crassigibbus F.Ritter; Notocactus meonacanthus Prestlé; Notocactus uebelmannianus Buining; Notocactus uebelmannianus f. flaviflorus N.Gerloff & Königs; Notocactus uebelmannianus f. gilviflorus Königs & N.Gerloff; Notocactus uebelmannianus var. nilsonii Königs; Notocactus uebelmannianus f. nilsonii (Königs) N.Gerloff & Neduchal; Notocactus uebelmannianus subsp. pleiocephalus (N.Gerloff & Königs) Lodé; Notocactus uebelmannianus var. pleiocephalus N.Gerloff & Königs; Parodia meonacantha (Prestlé) Hofacker; Parodia uebelmanniana F.Ritter; Parodia werneri Hofacker; Parodia werneri subsp. pleiocephala (N.Gerloff & Königs) Hofacker; Ritterocactus crassigibbus (F.Ritter) Doweld; Ritterocactus meonacanthus (Prestlé) Doweld; Ritterocactus uebelmannianus (Buining) Doweld; Ritterocactus uebelmannianus subsp. pleiocephalus (N.Gerloff & Königs) Doweld

= Parodia crassigibba =

Species of cactus

Parodia crassigibba, the green tomato cactus, is a species of cactus in the genus Parodia, native to Rio Grande do Sul state in southern Brazil. It has gained the Royal Horticultural Society's Award of Garden Merit as a houseplant.
