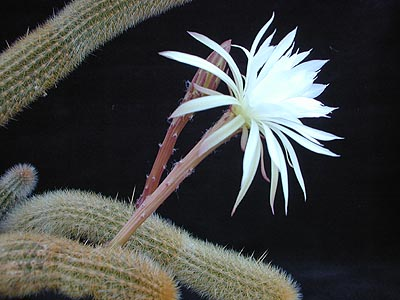

Conservation status
- Endangered (IUCN 3.1)

Scientific classification
- Kingdom: Plantae
- Clade: Embryophytes
- Clade: Tracheophytes
- Clade: Spermatophytes
- Clade: Angiosperms
- Clade: Eudicots
- Order: Caryophyllales
- Family: Cactaceae
- Subfamily: Cactoideae
- Genus: Arthrocereus
- Species: A. glaziovii

Binomial name
- Arthrocereus glaziovii (K.Schum.) N.P.Taylor & Zappi

Synonyms
- Cereus glaziovii K.Schum. 1890; Echinopsis glaziovii (K.Schum.) Molinari & Mayta 2015; Lophocereus glaziovii (K.Schum.) Orcutt 1926; Trichocereus glaziovii (K.Schum.) Werderm. 1933; Arthrocereus campos-portoi (Werderm.) Backeb. 1935; Arthrocereus damazioi (K.Schum.) P.V.Heath 1992; Arthrocereus itabiriticola P.J.Braun 1986; Cereus damazioi K.Schum. 1903; Leocereus glaziovii Britton & Rose 1920; Trichocereus campos-portoi Werderm. 1933; Trichocereus damazioi (K.Schum.) Werderm. 1933

= Arthrocereus glaziovii =

Species of cactus

Arthrocereus glaziovii is a species of flowering plant in the family Cactaceae. It is succulent cactus subshrub endemic to southeastern Brazil. Its natural habitat is rocky areas. It is threatened by habitat loss.

== Description ==
Arthrocereus glaziovii grows with erect shoots and slightly spreading side shoots from 1.5 to 2.5 cm (0.59 to 0.98 in) in diameter. There are 12 low ribs on the shoots. The 20 to 30 spines are subulate, brownish to ash gray in color and between 1.5 and 2.5 cm (0.59 and 0.98 in) long. The white flowers are slightly curved and up to 6 cm (2.4 in) long. Elongated fruits of up to 2 cm (0.79 in) are formed.

== Distribution ==
Arthrocereus glaziovii is widespread in the east and south of Belo Horizonte in the Brazilian state of Minas Gerais at altitudes of 1300 to 1750 meters. The distribution area covers around 1000 km^{2}.

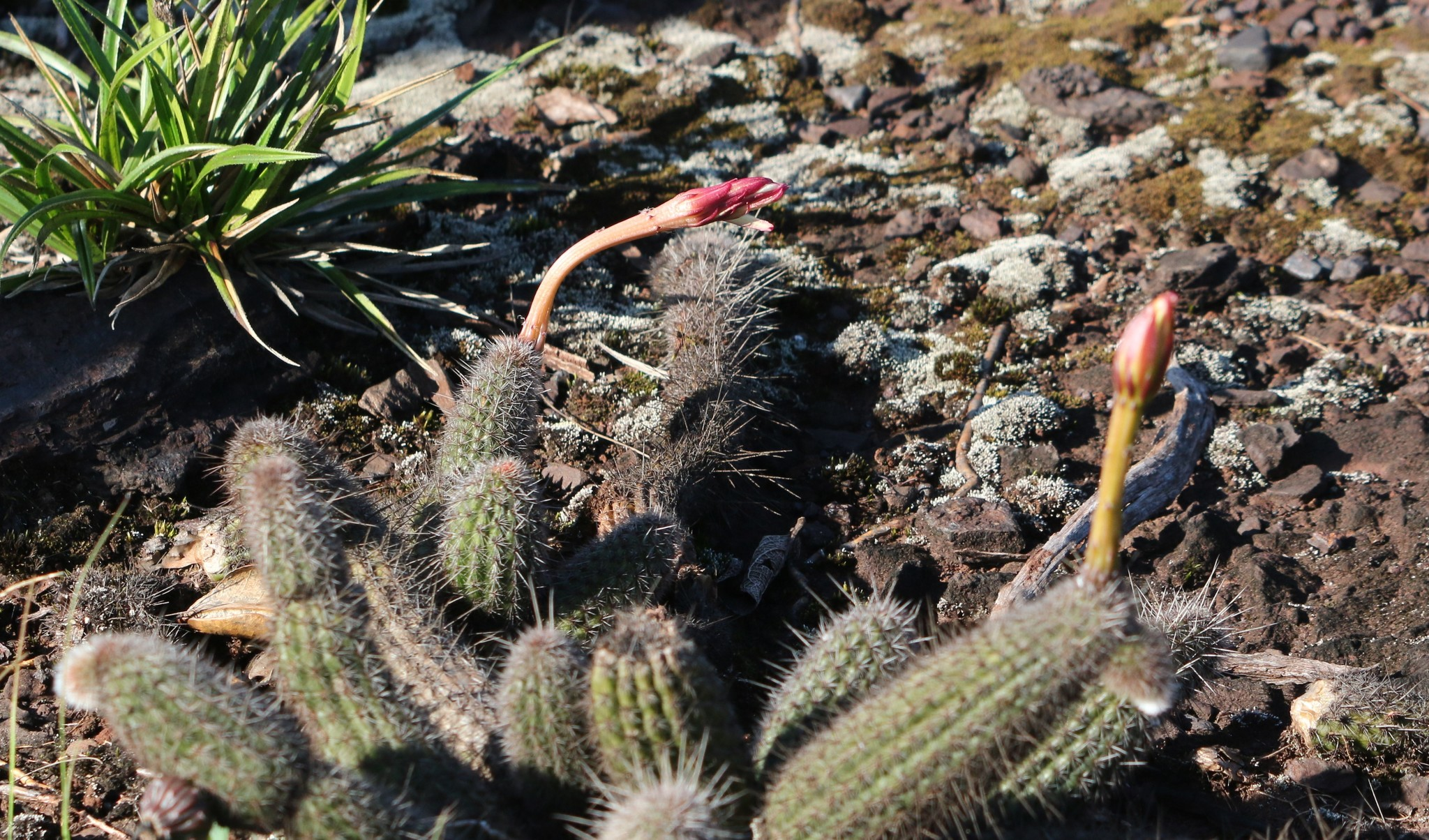
Habitat in Piedade do Paraopeba, Brumadinho, State of Minas Gerais, Brazil

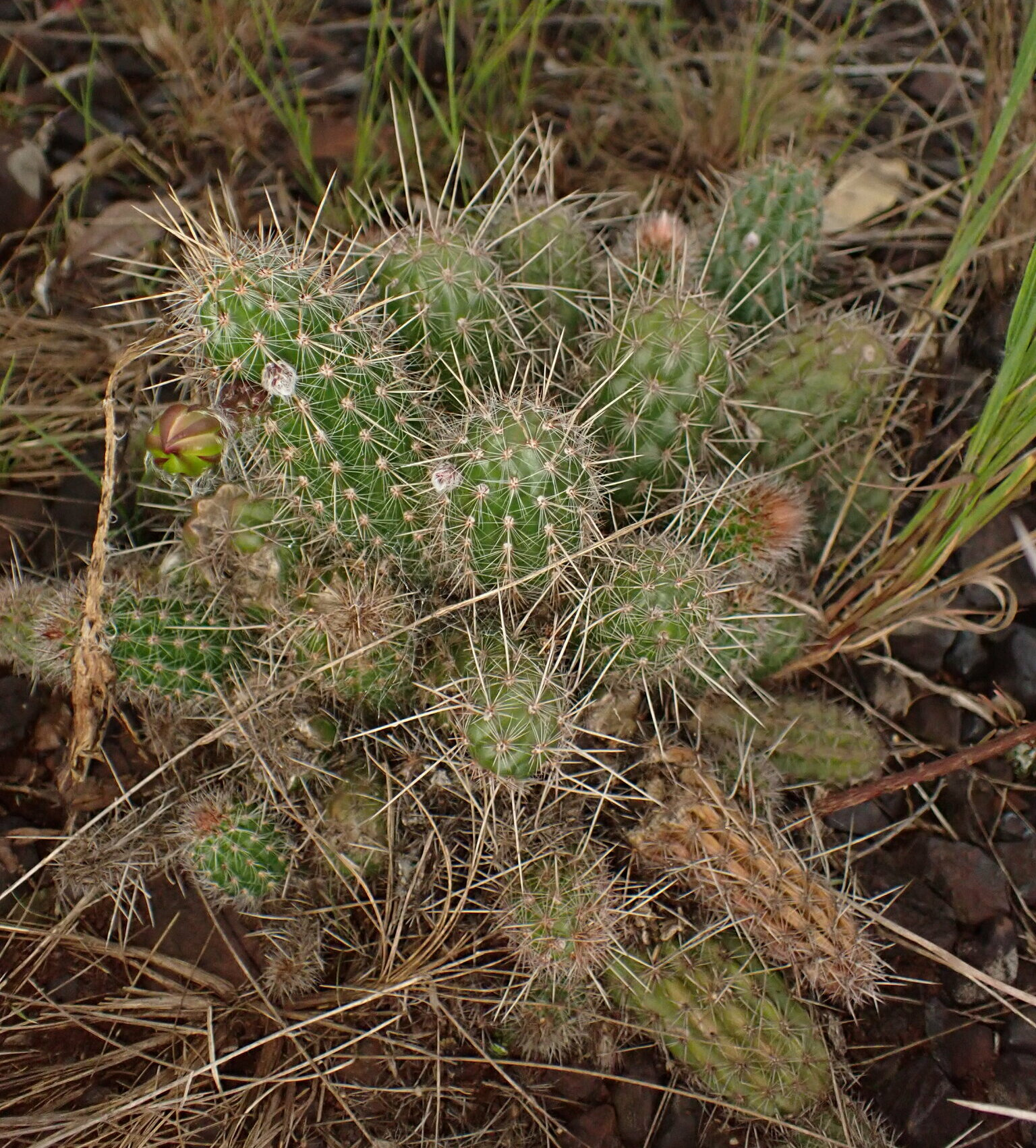
Habitat in Betim, State of Minas Gerais, Brazil

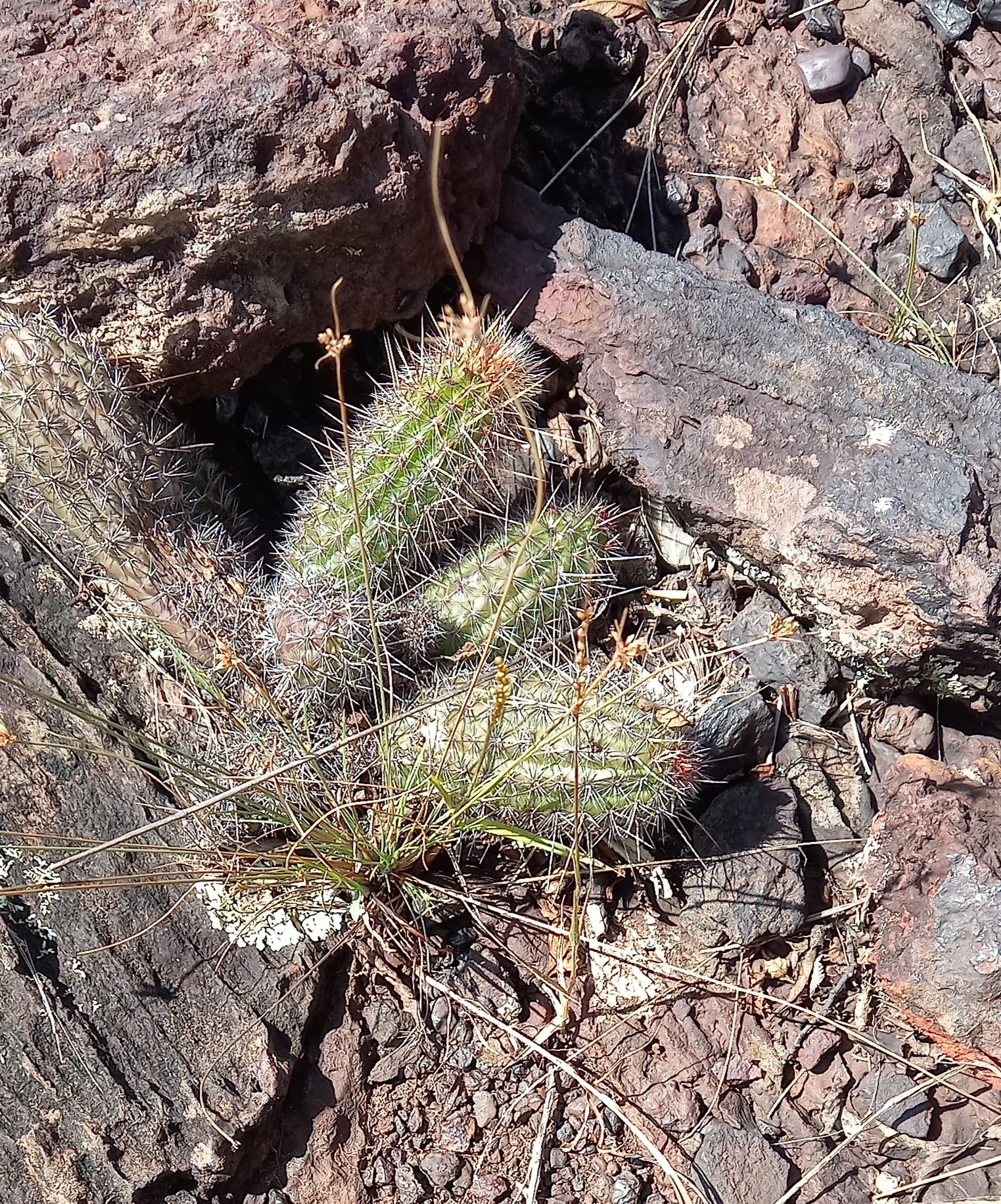
Plant growing in Brumadinho, State of Minas Gerais, Brazil

== Taxonomy ==
The first description as Cereus glaziovii by Karl Moritz Schumann was published in 1890. The specific epithet glaziovii honors the French plant collector and botanist Auguste François Marie Glaziou, who lived in Brazil from 1861 to 1895. Nigel Paul Taylor and Daniela Cristina Zappi placed the species in the genus Arthrocereus in 1991. Further nomenclature synonyms are Leocereus glaziovii (K.Schum.) Britton & Rose (1920), Trichocereus glaziovii (K.Schum.) Werderm. (1933) and Echinopsis glaziovii (K.Schum.) Molinari & Mayta (2015).
