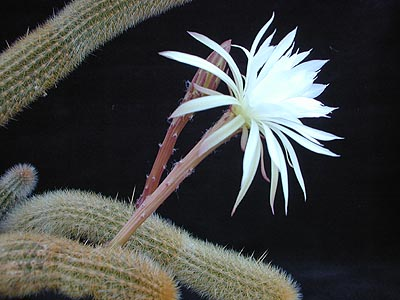
- Arthrocereus glaziovii

Scientific classification
- Kingdom: Plantae
- Clade: Tracheophytes
- Clade: Angiosperms
- Clade: Eudicots
- Order: Caryophyllales
- Family: Cactaceae
- Subfamily: Cactoideae
- Tribe: Cereeae
- Subtribe: Trichocereinae
- Genus: Arthrocereus; A.Berger, nom. cons.

Species
- See text.

= Arthrocereus =

Genus of plant in the family Cactaceae

Arthrocereus is a genus of cactus, native to southeast and west-central Brazil.

== Description ==
The relatively small, bushy, erect or prostrate species of the genus Arthrocereus are branched or unbranched. The articulated, cylindrical shoots have 10 to 18 low and narrow ribs on which small areoles sit from which many thin thorns emerge. The elongated, bell-shaped, wide-opening flowers appear near the shoot tip and open at night. The flower cup and the flower tube are covered with wool, hair-like thorns and a few pointed scales.

The spherical to obversely pear-shaped fruits are green and have white flesh. They are thin-walled, non-tearing, and have scales and hair-like spines. The slanting egg-shaped seeds are black.

== Species ==
As of October 2025, Plants of the World Online accepts the following species:

Section	Image	Scientific name	Distribution
Arthrocereus		Arthrocereus glaziovii (K.Schum.) N.P.Taylor & Zappi	Brazil.
Arthrocereus		Arthrocereus melanurus (K.Schum.) Diers, P.Br. & Esteves	Brazil
Arthrocereus		Arthrocereus rondonianus Backeb. & Voll	Brazil.
Chapadocereus P.J.Braun & Esteves 1995		Arthrocereus spinosissimus (Buining & Brederoo) F.Ritter	Brazil.
