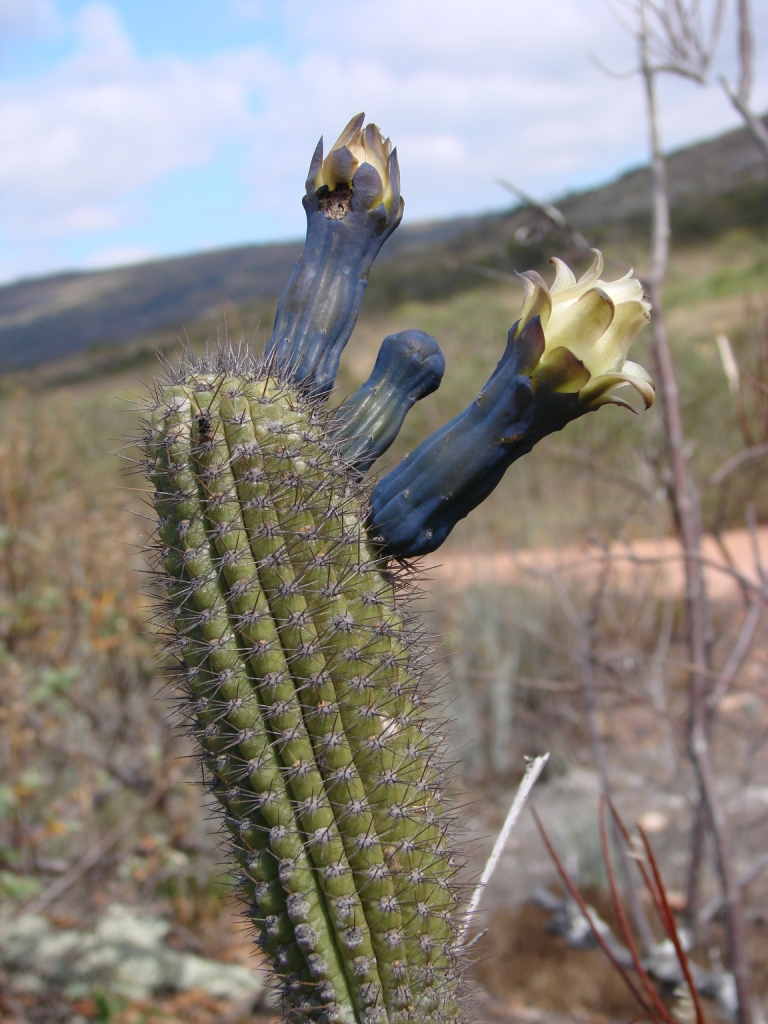
- Cipocereus minensis

Scientific classification
- Kingdom: Plantae
- Clade: Tracheophytes
- Clade: Angiosperms
- Clade: Eudicots
- Order: Caryophyllales
- Family: Cactaceae
- Subfamily: Cactoideae
- Tribe: Cereeae
- Subtribe: Cereinae
- Genus: Cipocereus; F.Ritter

Type species
- Cipocereus pleurocarpus F.Ritter

Species
- See text

= Cipocereus =

Genus of cacti

Cipocereus is a genus of cacti native to Brazil. These species were previously included in the genera Pilosocereus and Cereus.

== Description ==
The plants of the genus Cipocereus are shrubby and occasionally branched in habit, with columnar stems growing to heights of up to 3.5 m. The cylindrical, somewhat-woody shoots are 2 to 5 cm in diameter. On the 4 to 21 ribs are round, white or brown areoles from which a few to many spines arise, which can sometimes be missing and are of variable shape.

The white, tubular flowers open at night and sometimes remain open into the following day. The pericarp and floral tube are ribbed, more or less round in cross-section, and are coated with a thick blue wax. The scales are narrow and widely-spaced.

The spherical to egg-shaped nondehiscent fruits are an intense grey-blue color. The floral remnant remains on the fruit. The brownish-black to black, more or less dull seeds are broadly oval and 1 to 2 millimeters long.

== Species ==
Species of the genus Cipocereus according to Plants of the World Online as of May 2025:

Image	Scientific name	Distribution
	Cipocereus bradei (Backeb. & Voll) Zappi & N.P.Taylor 1991	Minas Gerais - Brazil
	Cipocereus crassisepalus (Buining & Brederoo) Zappi & N.P.Taylor 1991	Minas Gerais - Brazil
	Cipocereus laniflorus N.P.Taylor & Zappi 1997	Minas Gerais - Brazil
	Cipocereus minensis (Werderm.) F.Ritter 1979	Minas Gerais - Brazil
	Cipocereus pleurocarpus F.Ritter 1979	Minas Gerais - Brazil
