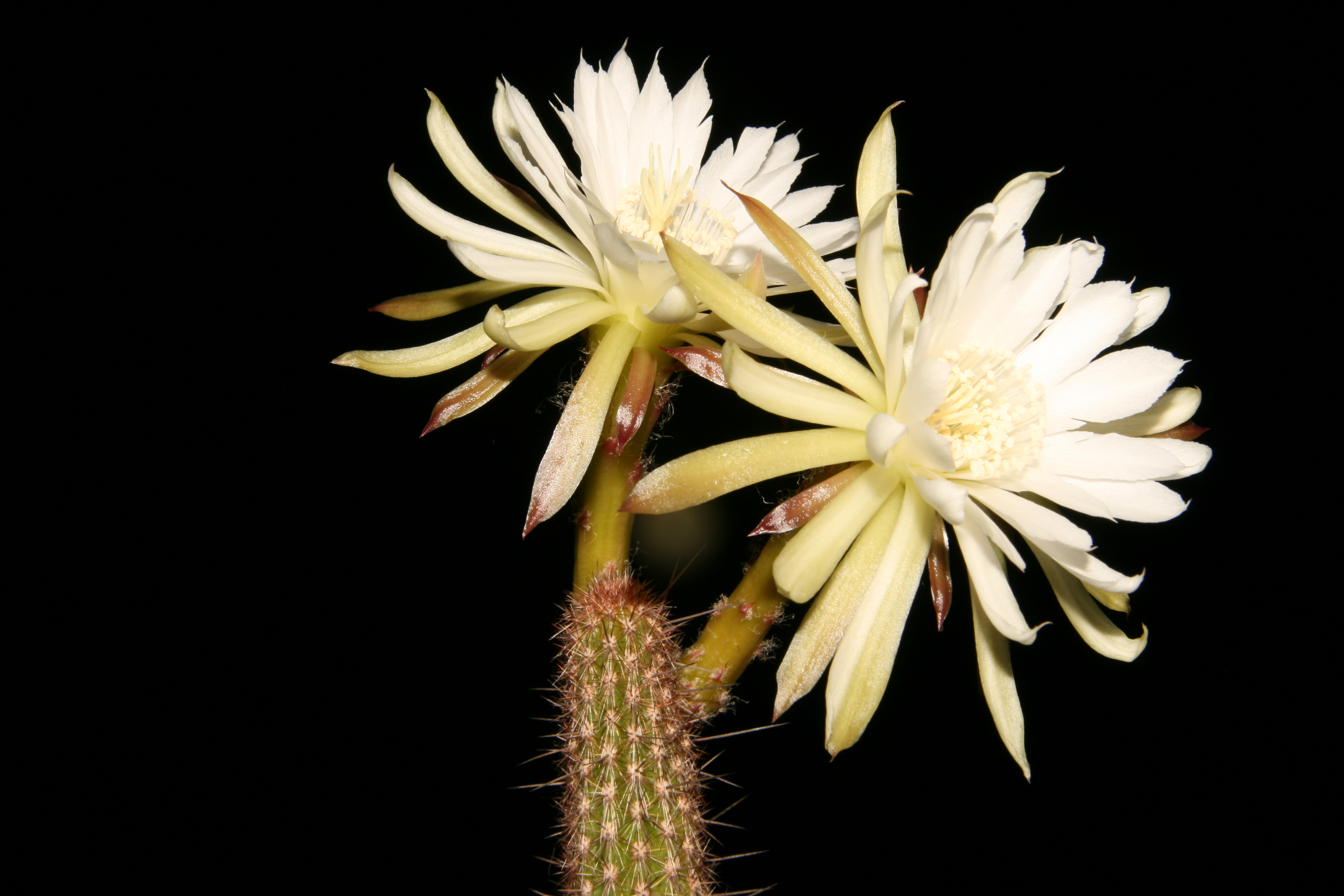

Conservation status
- Vulnerable (IUCN 3.1)

Scientific classification
- Kingdom: Plantae
- Clade: Embryophytes
- Clade: Tracheophytes
- Clade: Spermatophytes
- Clade: Angiosperms
- Clade: Eudicots
- Order: Caryophyllales
- Family: Cactaceae
- Subfamily: Cactoideae
- Genus: Arthrocereus
- Species: A. melanurus

Binomial name
- Arthrocereus melanurus (K.Schum.) L.Diers, P.J.Braun & Esteves

Synonyms
- Cereus melanurus K.Schum. 1876

= Arthrocereus melanurus =

Species of cactus

Arthrocereus melanurus is a species of plant in the family Cactaceae. It is endemic to Brazil. Its natural habitats are dry savanna and rocky areas. It is threatened largely by habitat loss.

== Description ==
Arthrocereus melanurus grows basally branched with multiple shoots that are up to a meter or more long. The shoots are divided at short intervals, with the individual segments being 10 to 40 cm (3.9 to 15.7 in) long and having a diameter of 2.5 to 3.5 cm (0.98 to 1.38 in). The 9 to 19 low ribs are 2 to 3 mm (0.079 to 0.118 in) high. There are numerous, unequally long, golden yellow to white thorns. The up to 15 strong upper marginal and central spines are brown. The approximately 20 lower bristle-like radial spines are between 5 and 8 mm (0.20 and 0.31 in) long. The yellow to white flowers are up to 6 cm (2.4 in) long.

=== Subspecies ===
Image	Name	Distribution
	Arthrocereus melanurus subsp. melanurus	Brazil (SW. Minas Gerais).
	Arthrocereus melanurus subsp. magnus N.P.Taylor & Zappi	Brazil (S. Minas Gerais)
	Arthrocereus melanurus subsp. odorus (F.Ritter) N.P.Taylor & Zappi	Brazil (S. Central Minas Gerais)

== Distribution ==
Arthrocereus melanurus is widespread in the Brazilian state of Minas Gerais at altitudes of 700 to 1700 meters.

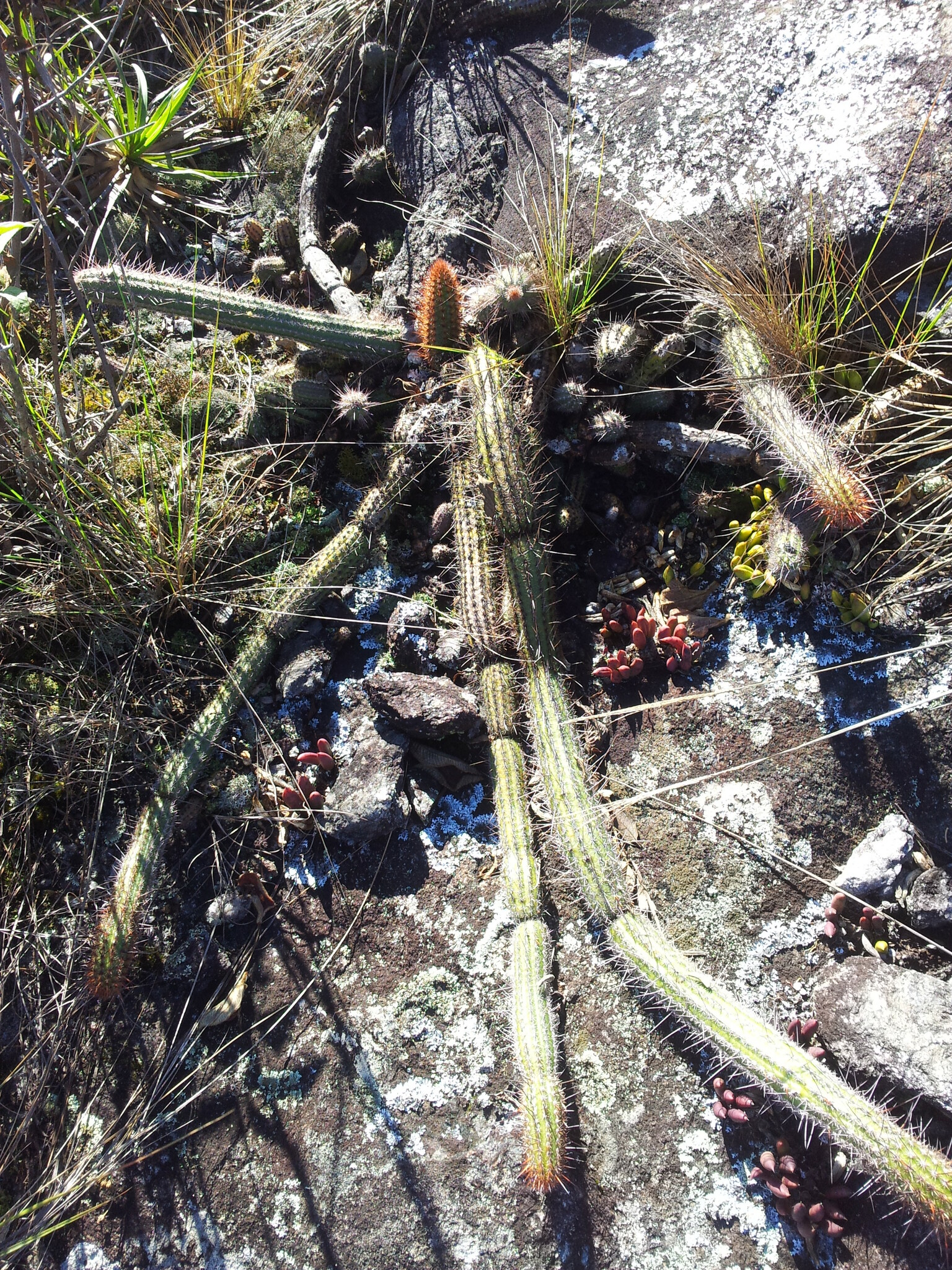
Habitat in Carrancas, Minas Gerais, Brazil

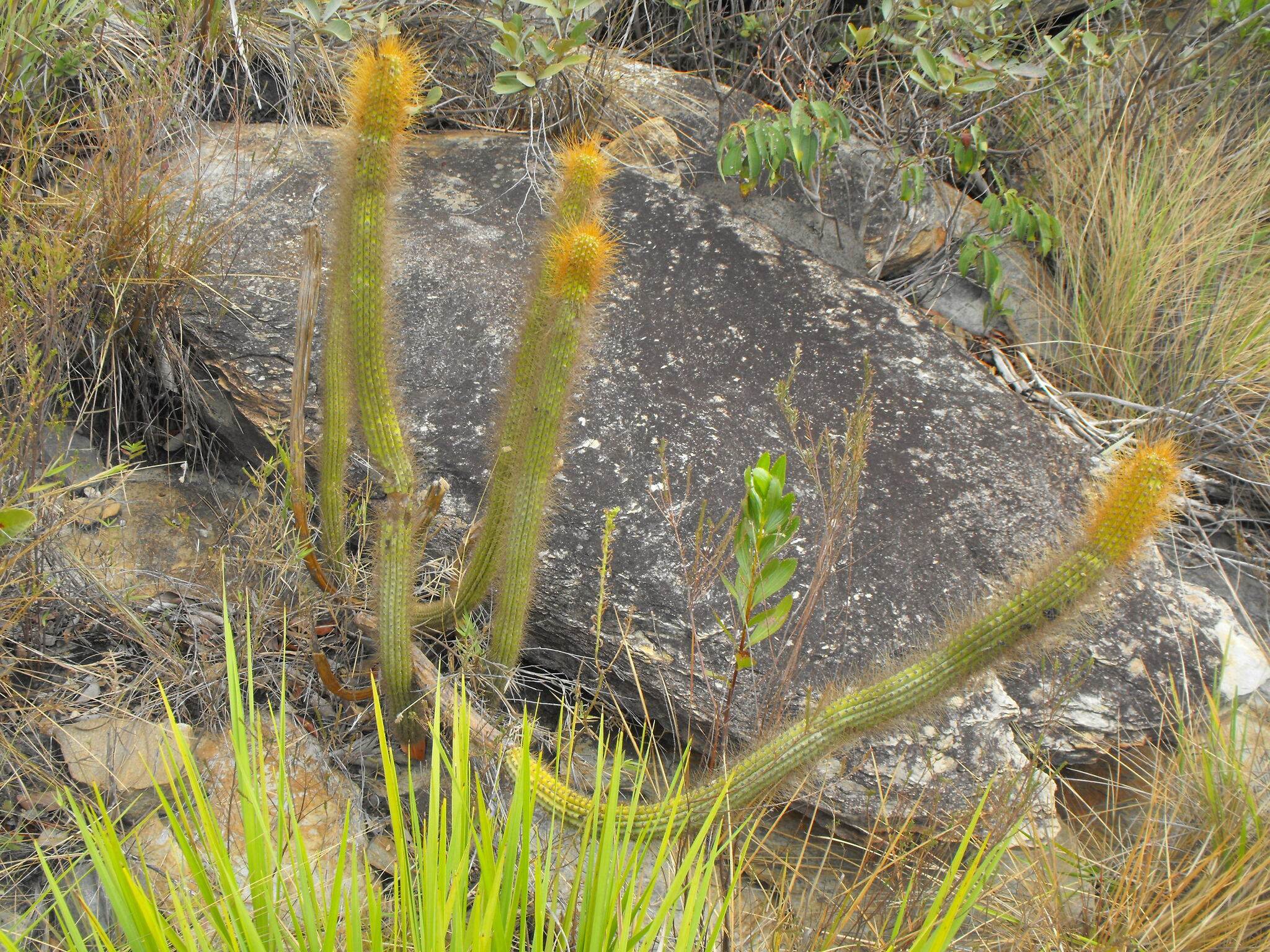
Arthrocereus melanurus odorus growing in Serra do Cipó, Santana do Riacho - State of Minas Gerais, Brazil

== Taxonomy ==
The first description as Cereus melanurus by Karl Moritz Schumann was published in 1890. The specific epithet melanurus is derived from the Greek words "μέλας" for black and "οὐρά" and refers to the appearance of the first plants collected. Lothar Diers, Pierre Josef Braun and Eddie Esteves Pereira placed the species in the genus Arthrocereus in 1987.[3] A nomenclature synonym is Leocereus melanurus (K.Schum.) Britton & Rose (1920).
