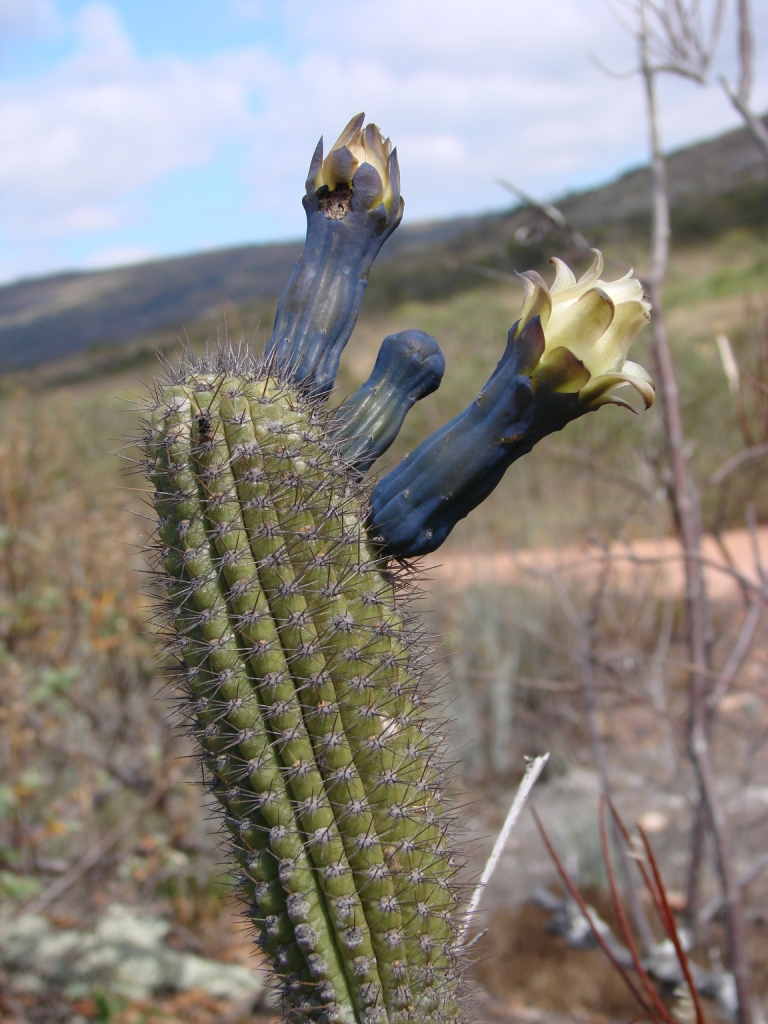

Scientific classification
- Kingdom: Plantae
- Clade: Embryophytes
- Clade: Tracheophytes
- Clade: Angiosperms
- Clade: Eudicots
- Order: Caryophyllales
- Family: Cactaceae
- Subfamily: Cactoideae
- Genus: Cipocereus
- Species: C. minensis

Binomial name
- Cipocereus minensis (Werderm.) F.Ritter 1979

Synonyms
- Cephalocereus minensis (Werderm.) L.Y.Dawson 1957; Cereus minensis Werderm. 1933; Coleocephalocereus minensis (Werderm.) F.H.Brandt 1981; Pilocereus minensis (Werderm.) Backeb. 1935; Pilosocereus minensis (Werderm.) Byles & G.D.Rowley 1957

= Cipocereus minensis =

Species of cactus

Cipocereus minensis is a species of Cipocereus found in Minas Gerais, Brazil.

== Description ==
It is a columnar cactus grows shrubby with branched, columnar, green shoots and reaches heights of up to 2 meters tall with stems 2 to 5 centimeters in diameter and 10-15 ribs with around 20 spines. The round areoles are covered with white or brownish wool. They give rise to greyish-white or yellowish thorns that darken over time. The 1 to 4 conspicuous central spines, occasionally there are more, are up to 2.5 centimeters long. The 8 to 16 radial spines have a length of 1 to 2 centimeters. It has greenish-white nocturnal flowers, up to 7 cm long and 3 cm in diameter, followed by a blue fruit, spherical in shape when ripe and smooth.

=== Subspecies ===
- Cipocereus minensis subsp. leiocarpus N.P.Taylor & Zappi
- Cipocereus minensis subsp. minensis

== Distribution ==
Cipocereus minensis is a cactus species endemic to Minas Gerais, Brazil.

== Taxonomy ==
It was first described as Cereus minensis by Erich Werdermann in 1933. The specific epithet "minensis" refers to its occurrence in Minas Gerais. In 1979, Friedrich Ritter reclassified the species into the genus Cipocereus.
