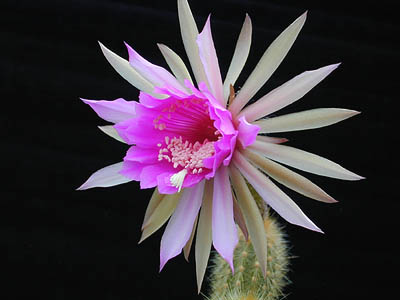

Conservation status
- Least Concern (IUCN 3.1)

Scientific classification
- Kingdom: Plantae
- Clade: Tracheophytes
- Clade: Angiosperms
- Clade: Eudicots
- Order: Caryophyllales
- Family: Cactaceae
- Subfamily: Cactoideae
- Genus: Arthrocereus
- Species: A. rondonianus

Binomial name
- Arthrocereus rondonianus Backeb. & Voll

= Arthrocereus rondonianus =

Species of cactus

Arthrocereus rondonianus is a species of plant in the family Cactaceae. It is endemic to Brazil. Its natural habitats are dry savanna and rocky areas, and it is currently threatened by habitat loss.

== Description ==
Arthrocereus rondonianus grows somewhat upright with slender, light green shoots up to 50 cm (20 in) long and 2.5 cm (0.98 in) in diameter. There are 14 to 18 low, rounded ribs on the shoots. The greenish yellow to golden yellow spines can be divided into 1 to 2 central spines that are up to 7 cm (2.8 in) long and 40 to 50 fine, needle-shaped radial spines of up to 0.5 (some to 2) centimeters in length. The purple-pink flowers are up to 8 cm (3.1 in) long.

== Distribution ==
Arthrocereus rondonianus is found in the Brazilian state of Minas Gerais in the Diamantina area at altitudes of 700 to 1200 meters.

== Taxonomy ==
The first description by Curt Backeberg and Otto Voll was published in 1951. Arthrocereus rondonianus was classified as Vulnerable (VU) in the IUCN Red List of Threatened Species 2002. H. classified as endangered. Since that time several new populations have been found in nature. In 2013, the species was classified as "Least Concern (LC)"
