= Anceschi =

Anceschi is an Italian surname. Notable people with the surname include:

- Adelaide Anceschi (1839–?), Italian-born, Malta-based photographer
- Luciano Anceschi (1911–1995), Italian literary critic and essayist
- Stefano Anceschi (born 1984), Italian sprinter
