= Magli =

Magli is an Italian surname. Notable people with the surname include:

- Antonio Magli (born 1991), Italian footballer
- Augusto Magli (1923–1998), Italian footballer
- Giovanni Gualberto Magli, Italian castrato
- Giulio Magli (born 1964), Italian astrophysicist/archaeoastronomer

== Other ==
- Bruno Magli, Italian luxury brand
- Magli Dériza, pseudonyme of the French opera singer Marguerite Bériza
