= Daniela Cristina Zappi =

Brazilian botanist

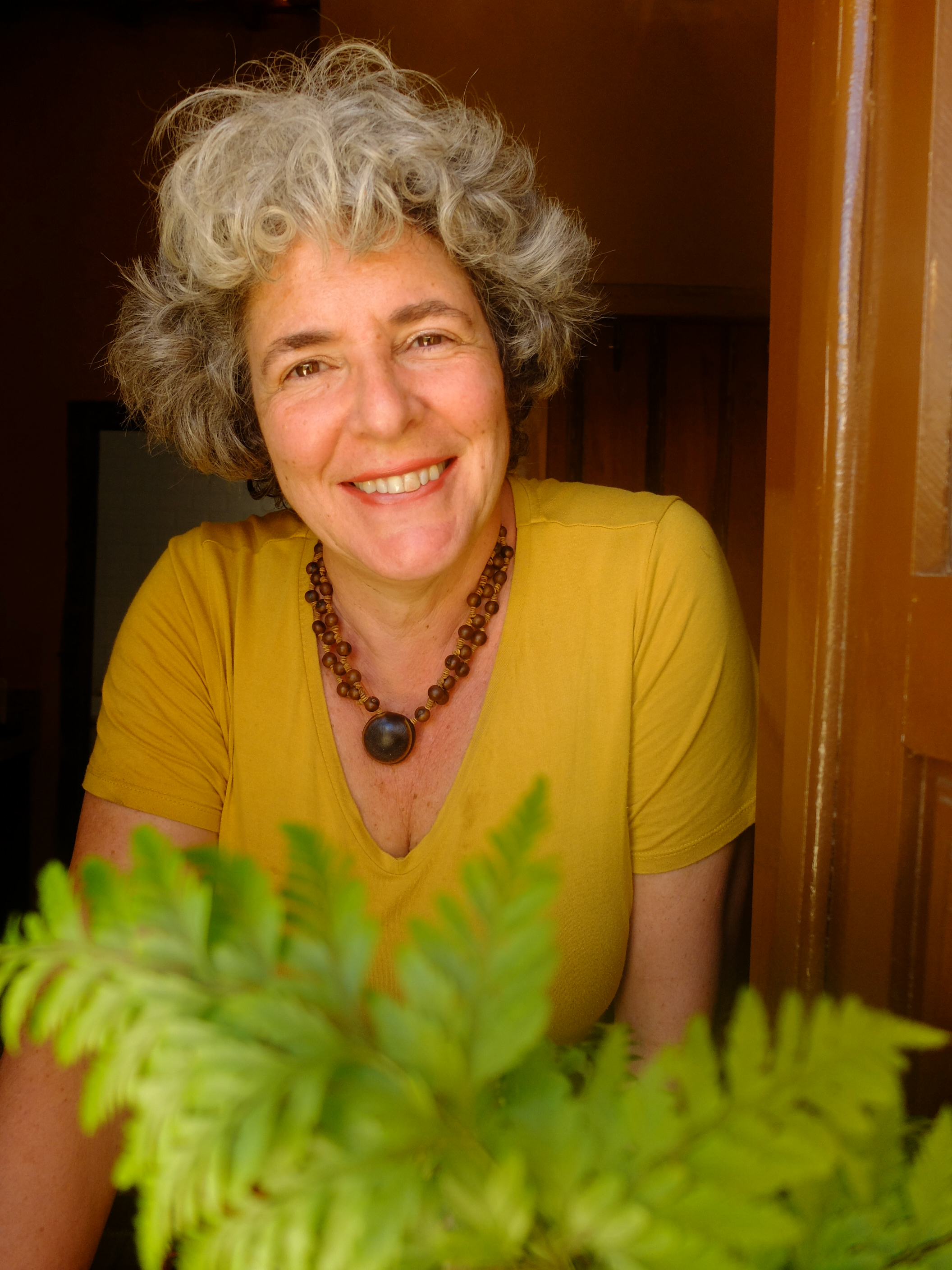
- Education: University of São Paulo
- Scientific career
- Fields: Botany, Plant taxonomy
- Workplaces: Royal Botanic Gardens, Kew
- Doctoral advisor: Ana Maria Giulietti

Daniela Cristina Zappi (born 1965) is a Brazilian botanist, plant collector, and research scientist at the herbarium of the Royal Botanic Gardens, Kew noted for studying and describing Neotropical flora, Rubiaceae, and Cactaceae. She has described over 90 species. The standard author abbreviation Zappi is used to indicate this person as the author when citing a botanical name.

== Education/Degree ==
Daniela Cristina Zappi started her college life in 1982 getting her degree in Biological Sciences, but this went up through the years. In the year (1987-1989) Daniela got her master's degree in Biological Sciences at the same University. Lastly, in 1989-1992 Daniela got her PhD in Biological sciences.

== Participation in Events ==
Dr. Daniela Cristina Zappi has been very active in this subject of science for the past ten years. She has participated in multiple events like the Royal Botanic Gardens, Kew in projects working with Rubiaceae. Cactaceae, the Flora Neotropical and Loganiaceae. Another project she worked on was with Instituto Tecnologico Vale, Belem mainly focus on floristic of the Brazilian Flora. She was helping contribute biodiversity of data for mining and the natural capital of Para forests. Currently she's working as a visiting professor at the University of Brasilia supporting students through their career. Daniela still works on her studies on Cactaceae and Neotropical biography.

Daniela Cristina Zappi is a notable botanist, plant collector in the contribution to the field of botany, and research scientist. The most recent event she has participated was in 2023, "73 National Congress of Botany. Urban afforestation in the region of Carajás. 2023. (Congress)." This is where botanist share their projects with others and discuss new discovery of plants.
