= Albert Frederik Hendrik Buining =

Dutch botanist

Albert Frederik Hendrik Buining (25 August 1901 in Groningen – 9 May 1976) was a Dutch botanist.

The standard author abbreviation Buining is used to indicate this person as the author when citing a botanical name.
