= Nigel Taylor =

British botanist (born 1956)

Nigel Paul Taylor (born 1956) is a British botanist. He mainly focuses on the study of cacti. Taylor has been director of the Singapore Botanic Gardens since September 2011. He was previously curator of the Kew Gardens in London.
