= Binghamia =

Binghamia may refer to:

- Binghamia (butterfly), a genus of skippers in the family Hesperiidae
- Cupido (butterfly) (syn. Binghamia), a genus of butterfly in the family Lycaenidae
- Espostoa (syn. Binghamia), a genus of columnar cacti
