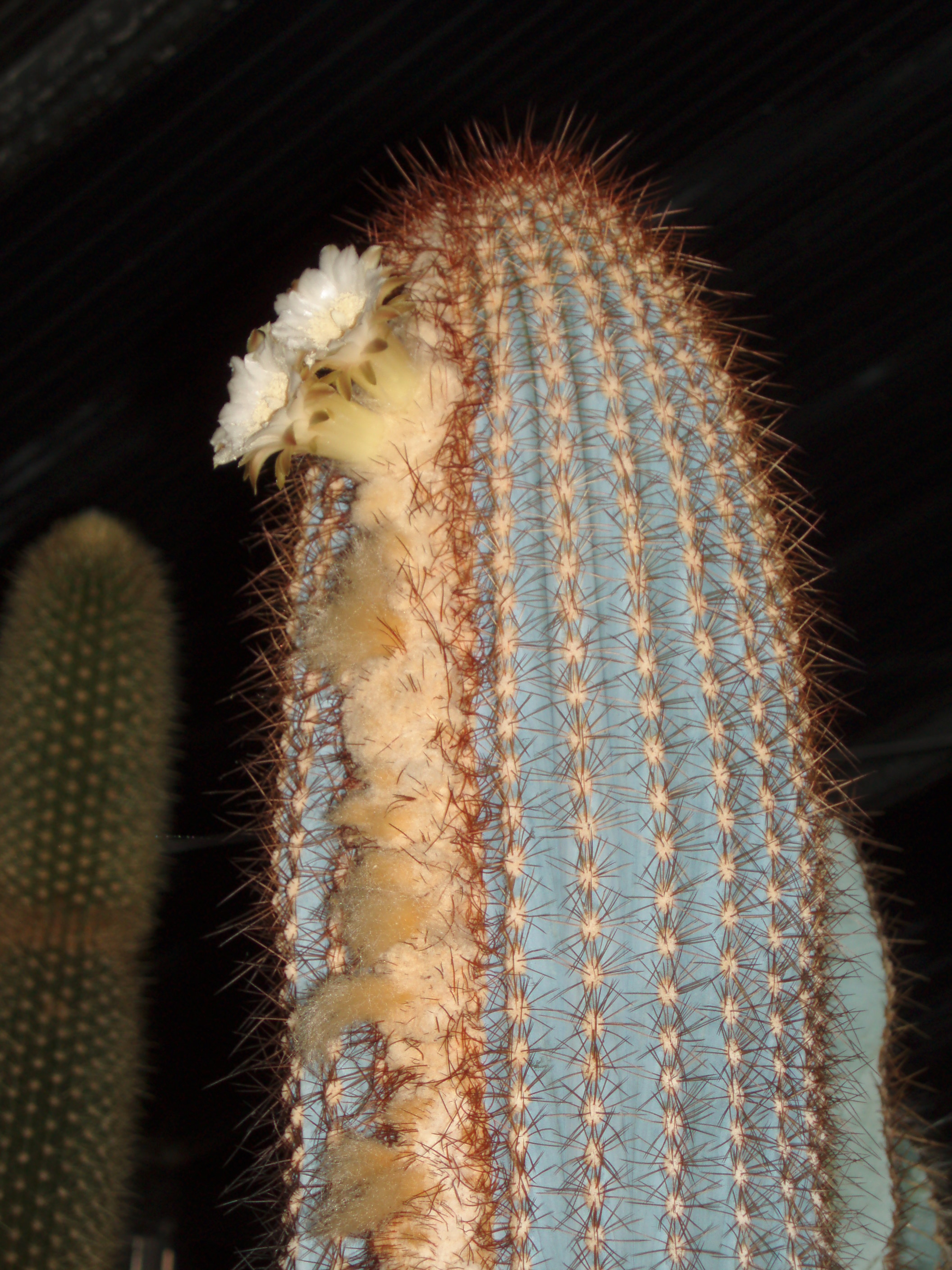

Scientific classification
- Kingdom: Plantae
- Clade: Tracheophytes
- Clade: Angiosperms
- Clade: Eudicots
- Order: Caryophyllales
- Family: Cactaceae
- Subfamily: Cactoideae
- Subtribe: Cereinae
- Genus: Siccobaccatus; P.J. Braun & Esteves

Species
- See text.

= Siccobaccatus =

Genus of cacti

Siccobaccatus is a genus of Brazilian cacti with two species. Its status as an independent genus has been disputed.

== Phylogeny ==
Based on a phylogenetic study published in 2023, Siccobaccatus was found to be separated from the rest of Micranthocereus, where it had been placed as a subgenus. It was closest to the genus Coleocephalocereus, and the authors suggested that Siccobaccatus should be treated as a subgenus of Coleocephalocereus. The relevant part of their cladogram is shown below:

- - - Siccobaccatus estevesii
    - Siccobaccatus dolichospermaticus
  - - Coleocephalocereus goebelianus
    - Coleocephalocereus sensu stricto, including Buiningia

A 2025 phylogenetic study did not include any Siccobaccatus species, but on the basis of stem anatomy recommended that Siccobaccatus should be kept as a separate genus from Coleocephalocereus.

== Species ==
As of January 2026, Plants of the World Online accepted two species:

Photo	Species	Distribution
	Siccobaccatus estevesii (Buining & Brederoo) P.J.Braun & Esteves	Tocantins & Minas Gerais
	Siccobaccatus dolichospermaticus (Buining & Brederoo) P.J.Braun & Esteves	Bahia & Minas Gerais
