= Coleocephalocereus fluminensis =

Conservation status
- Least Concern (IUCN 3.1)

Scientific classification
- Kingdom: Plantae
- Clade: Tracheophytes
- Clade: Angiosperms
- Clade: Eudicots
- Order: Caryophyllales
- Family: Cactaceae
- Subfamily: Cactoideae
- Genus: Coleocephalocereus
- Species: C. fluminensis

Binomial name
- Coleocephalocereus fluminensis (Miq.) Backeb.

Synonyms
- Austrocephalocereus fluminensis (Miq.) Buxb.; Cephalocereus fluminensis (Miq.) Britton & Rose; Cephalocereus melocactus K.Schum.; Cereus fluminensis Miq.; Cereus melocactus (K.Schum.) A.Berger

Species of cactus

Coleocephalocereus fluminensis is a species of succulent flowering plant in the genus Coleocephalocereus, within the family Cactaceae. It is endemic to southeastern Brazil.

== Description ==
Coleocephalocereus fluminensis is a species of cactus whose stems initially grow in a prostrate manner, but then turn upwards. The stems are dark green in color, branch at the base, and may reach 3 m in height and 10 cm in diameter.

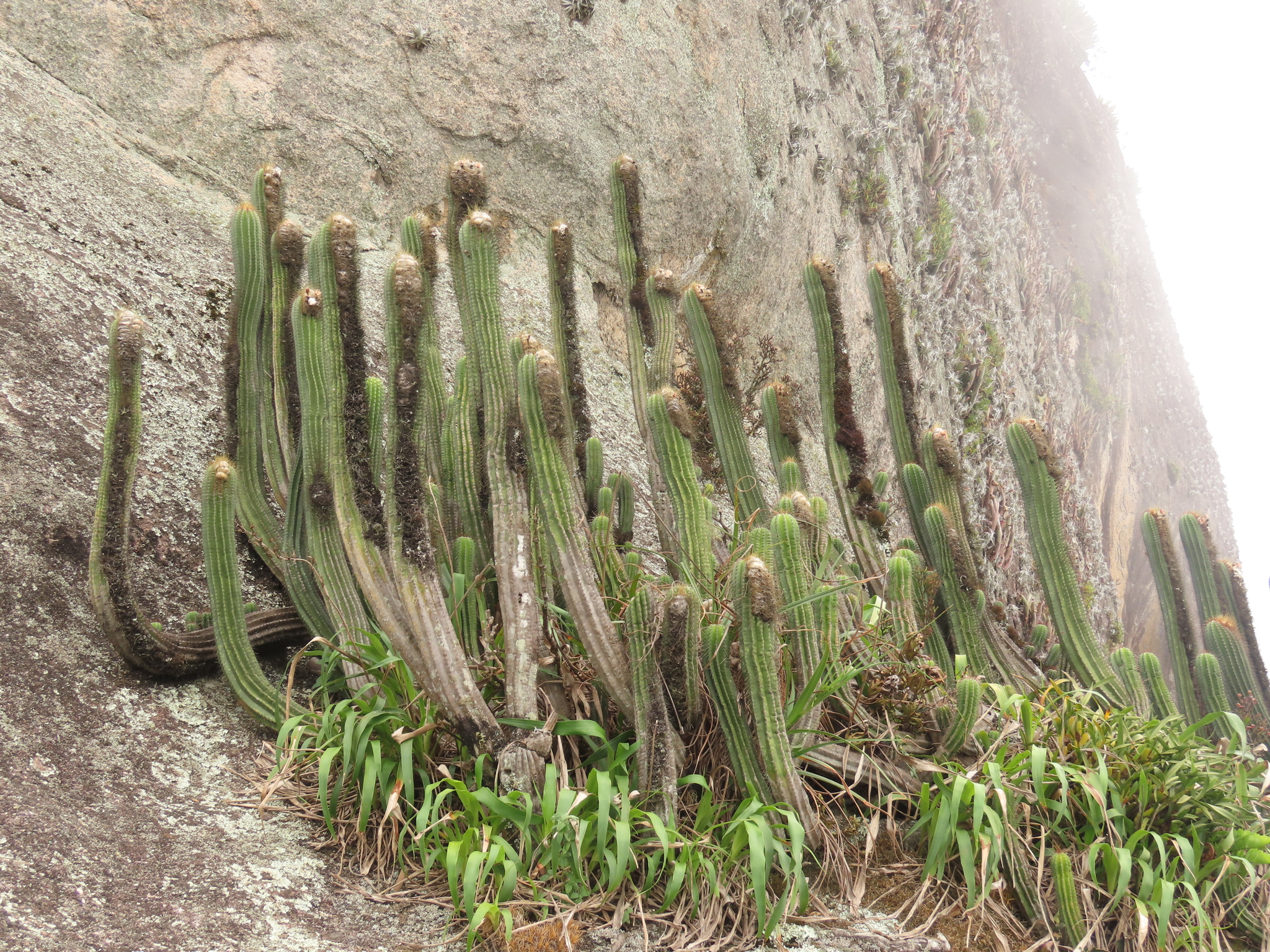
In habitat

This species has 5-17 straight ribs which are slightly divided into tubercles; the areoles are situated on top of the tubercles. The areoles have one central spine that is initially yellow-brown in color, but then changes to gray over time. There are 4-14 yellowish radial spines which also turn gray with age; these may measure up to 3 cm in length.

The flowers are off-white to light pink in color. They open at night and measure up to 7 cm in length. They develop from a woolly structure on the sides of the vertical stems called the pseudocephalium; this may measure up to 5 cm in width and 1 m in length. The pseudocephalium is made up of thick white wool and bristles, as well as many fine spines.

The fruits are thin and club-shaped. They are bright purple in color and measure 2-3 cm in length.

== Distribution and habitat ==
This species is native to southeastern Brazil, where it is found in eastern and southern Minas Gerais, Espirito Santo, Rio de Janeiro, and northeastern São Paulo. It grows primarily in the seasonally-dry tropical biome.

== Taxonomy ==
Coleocephalocereus fluminensis was first described as Cereus fluminensis, a name published in 1838 by the Dutch botanist Friedrich Anton Wilhelm Miquel in the scientific journal Bulletin des Sciences Physiques et Naturelles en Neerlande 1: 48.

Later, the German botanist Curt Backeberg transferred this species to the genus Coleocephalocereus, renaming it Coleocephalocereus fluminensis. He registered these changes in the scientific journal Cactaceae. Jahrbücher der Deutschen Kakteen-Gesellschaft 1941 (2): 53, published in 1942.

Etymology

- Coleocephalocereus: the genus name is derived from the Greek words koleon (meaning "veil" or "cover") and cephalé (meaning "head", in reference to the pseudocephalium from which the flowers develop), as well as from the Latin word cereus (meaning "candle"), in reference to the elongated straight growth form of this genus' stems.
- fluminensis: the specific epithet is derived from the Latin name of Rio de Janeiro (Flumen Januarii), to which this species is native.

=== Varieties ===
As of October 2026, Plants of the World Online accepted two varieties of this species:

Image	Variety	Description	Distribution
	Coleocephalocereus fluminensis var. braamhaarii P.J.Braun, 1982	Thinner, shorter stem.	Southeastern Brazil
	Coleocephalocereus fluminensis var. fluminensis	Thicker, taller stem.	Southeastern Brazil

Synonyms

- Synonyms of Coleocephalocereus fluminensis var. braamhaarii:
  - Coleocephalocereus fluminensis subsp. braamhaarii (PJBraun) PJBraun & Esteves, 1995
- Synonyms of Coleocephalocereus fluminensis var. fluminensis:
  - Cereus paulensis (Speg.) Werderm., 1931
  - Coleocephalocereus diersianus P.J.Braun & Esteves, 1988
  - Coleocephalocereus fluminensis subsp. paulensis (F.Ritter) PJBraun & Esteves, 1995
  - Coleocephalocereus fluminensis var. paulensis (F.Ritter) PJBraun, 1991
  - Coleocephalocereus paulensis F. Ritter, 1968
  - Leocereus paulensis Speg., 1925
  - Pilocereus melocactus K.Schum., 1893
  - Pilocereus velozoi Lem., 1862

== Conservation Status ==
On the IUCN Red List, Coleocephalocereus fluminensis is classified as being of Least Concern (LC).

== Cultivation ==
This species is cultivated mainly as an ornamental. It may be propagated vegetatively via cuttings, or via seed.

== Gallery ==
In habitat in Piúma, Espirito Santo, Brazil

Pseudocephalium

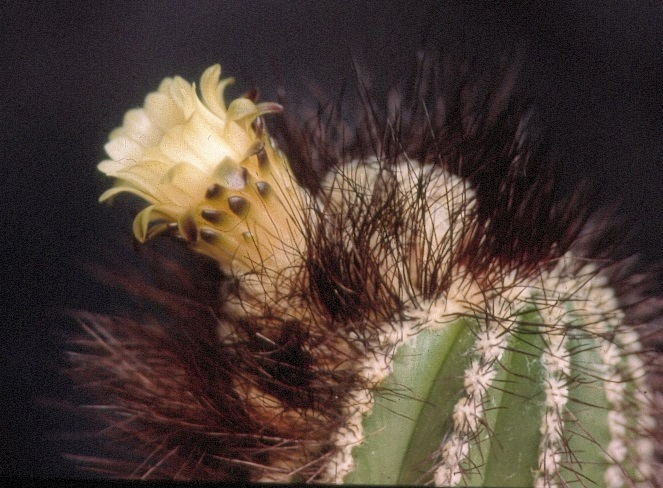
Flower

Fruits

Young plant
