= Espostoa mirabilis =

- Espostoa mirabilis growing in habitat in San Vicente - Huanabamba, La Libertad, Peru

Scientific classification
- Kingdom: Plantae
- Clade: Tracheophytes
- Clade: Angiosperms
- Clade: Eudicots
- Order: Caryophyllales
- Family: Cactaceae
- Subfamily: Cactoideae
- Genus: Espostoa
- Species: E. mirabilis

Binomial name
- Espostoa mirabilis F.Ritter

Synonyms
- Espostoa baumannii Kníže; Espostoa baumannii var. arborescens Kníže; Espostoa mirabilis var. primigena F.Ritter; × Espostocactus baumannii (Kníže) G.D.Rowley

Species of cactus

Espostoa mirabilis is a species of flowering plant in the family Cactaceae.

== Description ==
Espostoa mirabilis has columnar stems, and is shrubby to treelike in habit. It flowers from a red-brown pseudocephalium when mature.

== Distribution ==
Espostoa mirabilis is native to the departments of Cajamarca, Amazonas, and La Libertad in Northwestern Peru.

It inhabits the Marañón dry forests ecoregion.
