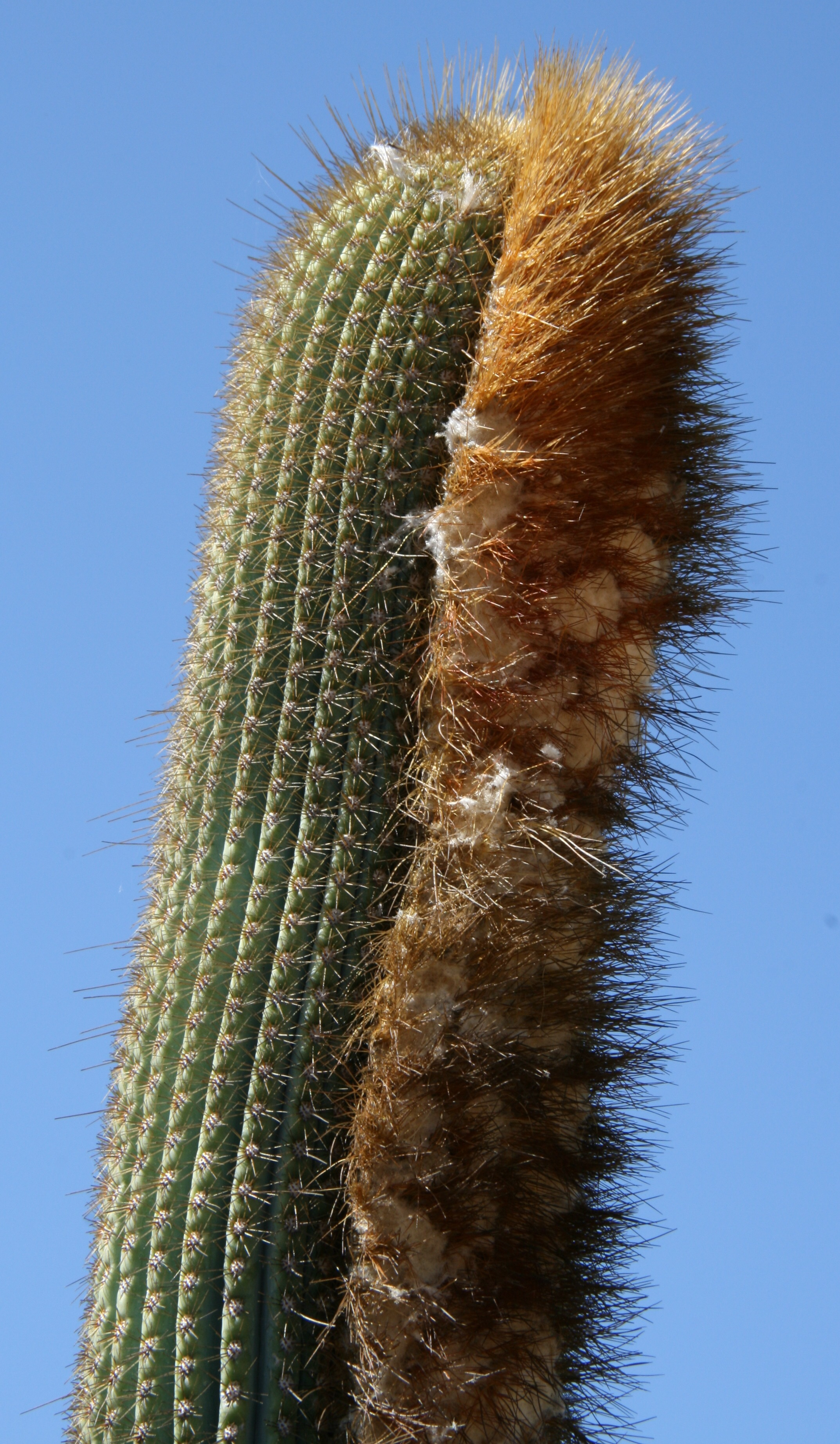

Conservation status
- Least Concern (IUCN 3.1)

Scientific classification
- Kingdom: Plantae
- Clade: Tracheophytes
- Clade: Angiosperms
- Clade: Eudicots
- Order: Caryophyllales
- Family: Cactaceae
- Subfamily: Cactoideae
- Genus: Siccobaccatus
- Species: S. estevesii

Binomial name
- Siccobaccatus estevesii (Buining & Brederoo) P. J. Braun & Esteves

Synonyms
- Austrocephalocereus estevesii Buining & Brederoo 1975; Coleocephalocereus neoestevesii N.P.Taylor 2023; Micranthocereus estevesii (Buining & Brederoo) F.Ritter 1979; Austrocephalocereus estevesii subsp. grandiflora Diers & Esteves 1989; Austrocephalocereus estevesii subsp. insigniflorus Diers & Esteves 1988; Siccobaccatus estevesii subsp. grandiflorus (Diers & Esteves) P.J.Braun & Esteves 1990; Siccobaccatus estevesii subsp. insigniflorus (Diers & Esteves) P.J.Braun & Esteves 1990; Siccobaccatus insigniflorus (Diers & Esteves) P.J.Braun & Esteves 2008

= Siccobaccatus estevesii =

Species of cactus

Siccobaccatus estevesii is a species of Siccobaccatus found in Brazil.

== Description ==
Siccobaccatus estevesii is a rare cactus species with columnar, bluish-green shoots that can reach up to 6 meters in height and 15 centimeters in diameter. It has 37 to 42 narrow ribs, round areoles with yellowish-brown wool and hair, 6 to 7 slightly curved central spines that are light brown and 0.2 to 3.5 centimeters long, and approximately 12 needle-like, light brown marginal spines that are 5 to 11 millimeters long. The cephalium, 5 to 7 centimeters wide, consists of white to cream-colored wool up to 2.2 centimeters long and red bristles up to 0.8 centimeters long. The broad, funnel-shaped flowers are white and open at night, measuring up to 3.5 centimeters in length and diameter. The light blue fruits are up to 1.3 centimeters long and 0.9 to 1.4 centimeters in diameter, drying out and falling apart when ripe.

== Taxonomy ==
This species was first described as Austrocephalocereus estevesii in 1974 by Albert Frederik Hendrik Buining and Arnold J. Brederoo. The specific epithet honors Brazilian cactus specialist Eddie Esteves Pereira, who discovered the species. Friedrich Ritter reclassified it into the genus Micranthocereus in 1979. Phylogenetic evidence in 2023 has shown that Micranthocereus estevesii and M. dolichospermaticus are separate from the rest of Micranthocereus. The genus Siccobaccatus was resurrected to maintain the monophyly of Micranthocereus.

== Distribution ==
Native to the Brazilian states of Goiás, Tocantins and northwestern Minas Gerais growing in rocky outcrops and semi-deciduous forest.

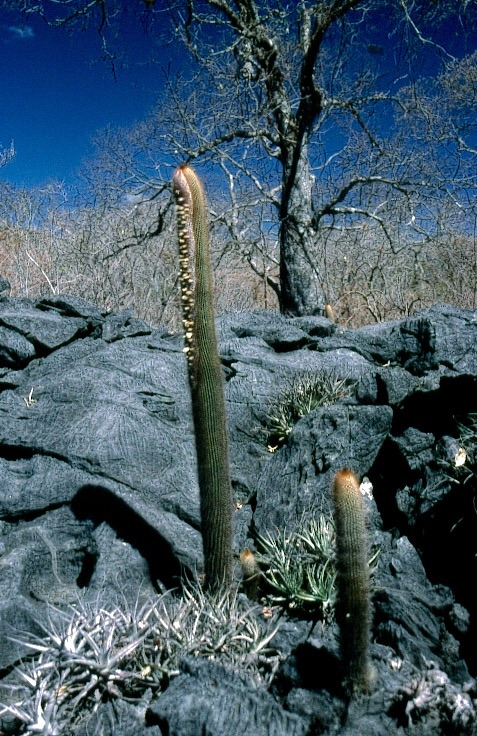
Habitat in NE Goias, Brazil

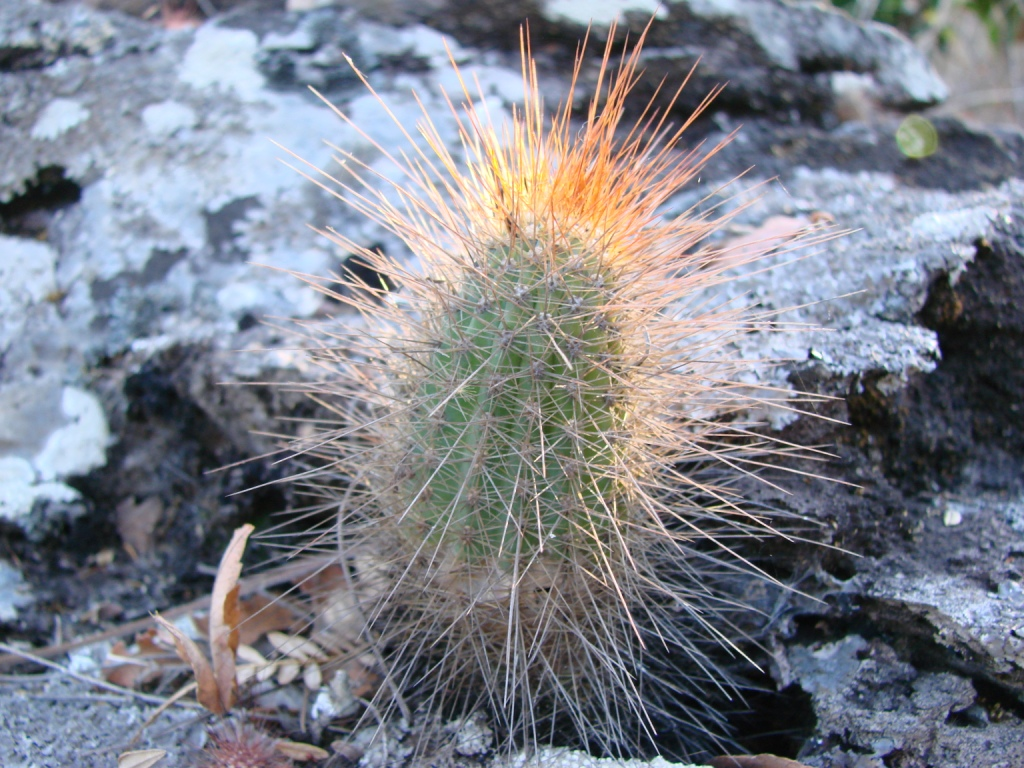
Plant growing in Parque Estadual Terra Ronca, São Domingos, Goiás

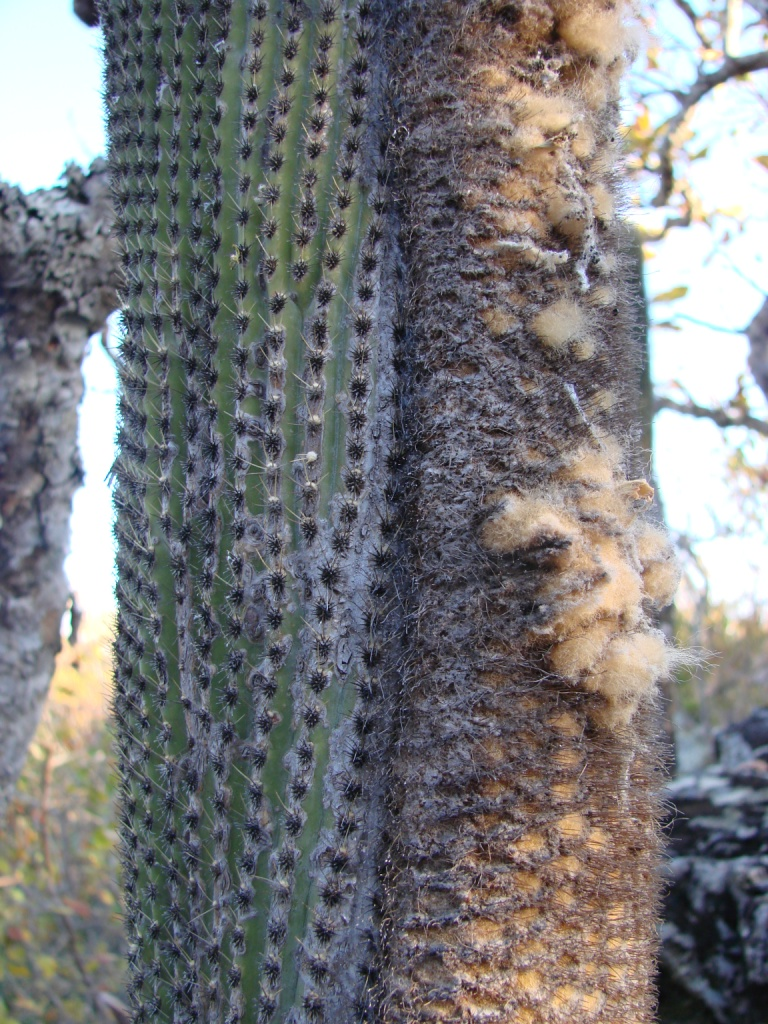
Plants growing in Parque Estadual Terra Ronca, São Domingos, Goiás
