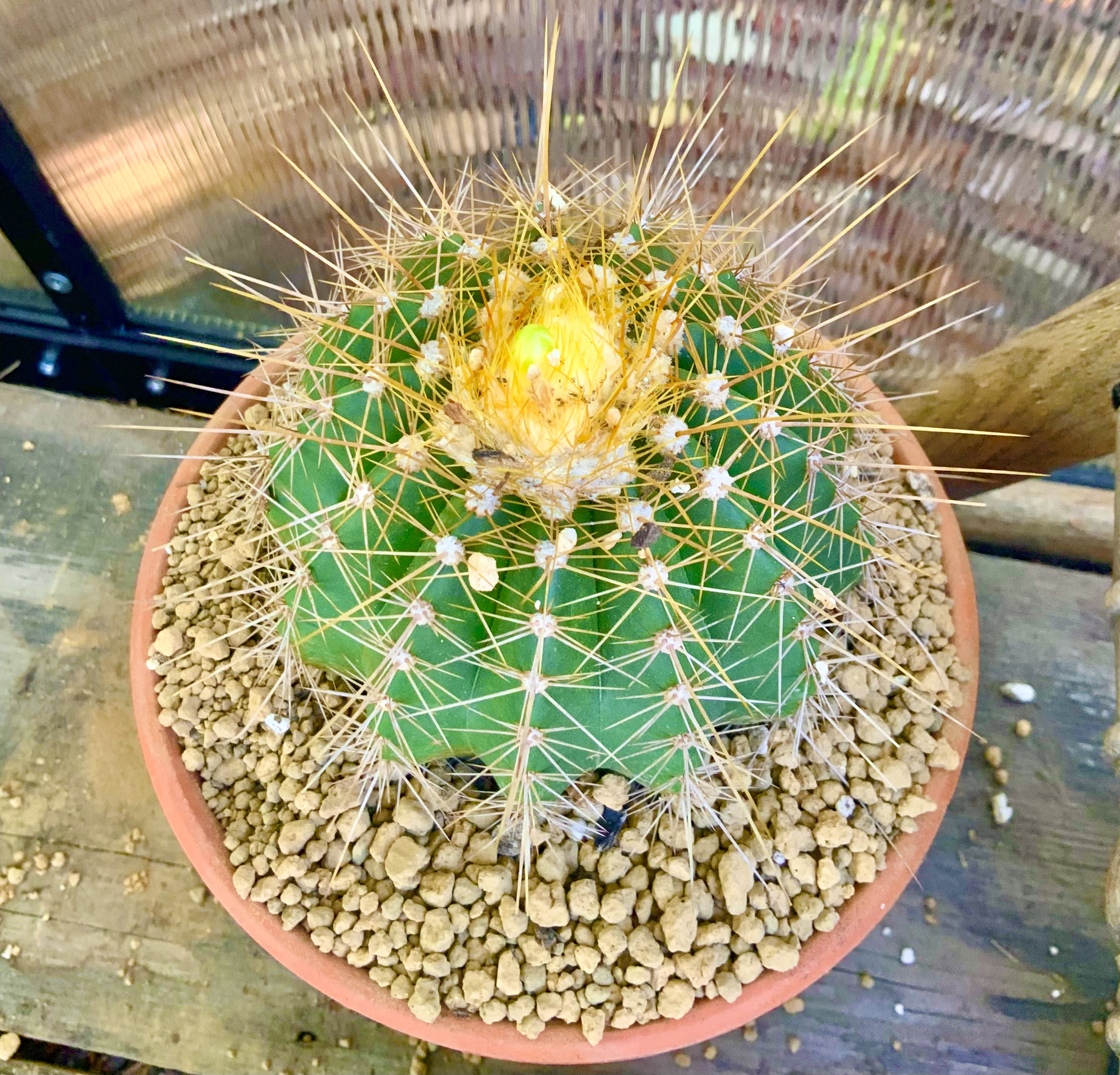

Conservation status
- Least Concern (IUCN 3.1)

Scientific classification
- Kingdom: Plantae
- Clade: Tracheophytes
- Clade: Angiosperms
- Clade: Eudicots
- Order: Caryophyllales
- Family: Cactaceae
- Subfamily: Cactoideae
- Genus: Coleocephalocereus
- Species: C. aureus

Binomial name
- Coleocephalocereus aureus F. Ritter

Synonyms
- Buiningia brevicylindrica Buining; Buiningia brevicylindrica var. elongata Buining; Buiningia brevicylindrica var. longispina Buining; Coleocephalocereus aureus subsp. brevicylindricus (Buining) P.J.Braun; Coleocephalocereus aureus subsp. elongatus (Buining) P.J.Braun; Coleocephalocereus aureus var. longispinus (Buining) P.J.Braun; Coleocephalocereus brevicylindricus (Buining) F.Ritter; Coleocephalocereus brevicylindricus var. elongatus (Buining) F.Ritter; Coleocephalocereus brevicylindricus var. longispinus (Buining) F.Ritter; Coleocephalocereus elongatus (Buining) P.J.Braun

= Coleocephalocereus aureus =

Species of cactus

Coleocephalocereus aureus is a near threatened species of plant in the family Cactaceae. It is endemic to Brazil, where it is confined to the state Minas Gerais. Its natural habitat is rocky areas.

== Description ==
Coleocephalocereus aureus is a short coloumnar cactus growing up to about 50 inches in height. Spines of this species are 3-5 inches long with a golden hue. This plant has around 9-30 ribs with closely set areoles. Spination can vary among specimens. Mature plants develop a golden cephalium. yellow flowers occasionally pop out of the cephalium, followed by small, red fruit.

== Distribution ==
Coleocephalocereus aureus is native to rocky outcrops in the state of Minas Gerais.

== Cultivation ==
Coleocephalocereus aureus is found sparingly in cultivation and is easy to grow. This species is known to be forgiving towards soil types, but does not tolerate freezing temperatures. This plant can be propagated via seed or cuttings.

== Gallery ==
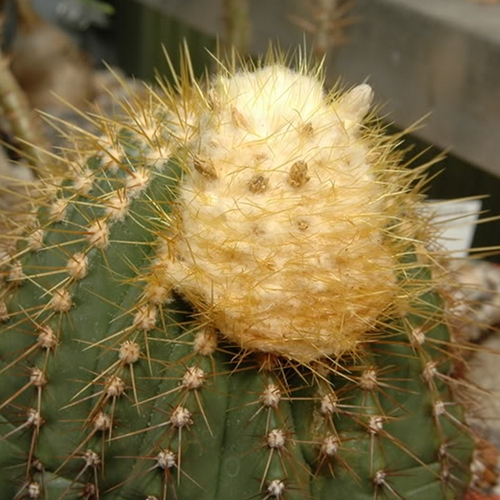
Cephalium

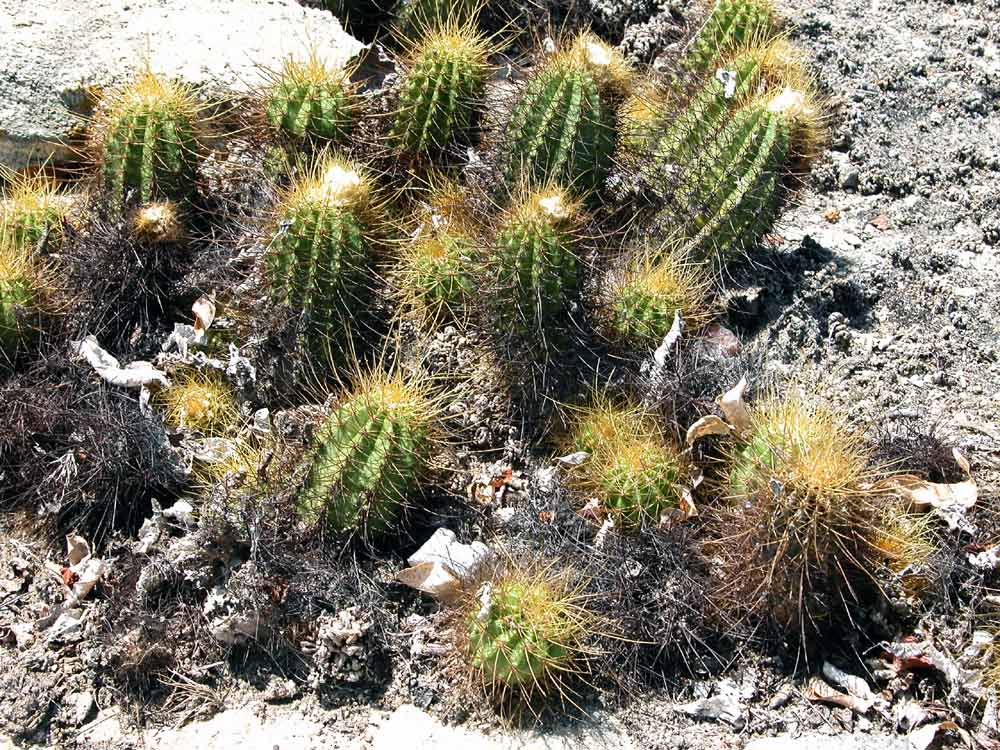
Coleocephalocereus aureus in natural habitat
