= Espostoa utcubambensis =

Conservation status
- Least Concern (IUCN 3.1)

Scientific classification
- Kingdom: Plantae
- Clade: Tracheophytes
- Clade: Angiosperms
- Clade: Eudicots
- Order: Caryophyllales
- Family: Cactaceae
- Subfamily: Cactoideae
- Genus: Espostoa
- Species: E. utcubambensis

Binomial name
- Espostoa utcubambensis G.J.Charles

Synonyms
- Espostoa calva subsp. utcubambensis (G.J.Charles) Guiggi

Species of plant

Espostoa utcubambensis is a species of succulent flowering plant in the genus Espostoa, within the family Cactaceae. It is endemic to the department of Amazonas in northern Peru.

== Description ==
Espostoa utcubambensis is a species of cactus with a treelike growth form. It can reach 5–7 m tall. It has a branching habit, with a well-defined trunk that can reach 1.5 m tall and 15 cm in diameter. The branches are tightly spaced and erect, and can reach 9 cm in diameter. The epidermis is dull gray-green in color.

The stems develop 25-30 ribs. The areoles possess 2-6 central spines, which in their juvenile phase are red-brown in color and become off-white with age; the longest of these point downwards. On new growth, the central spines can reach 0.6 cm long, while on the trunk, they can reach 2 cm. 11-12 radial spines are also present; these are off-white in color and can reach 0.5 cm long.

The pseudocephalium covers 8-12 ribs, and is covered in gray, uniformly-distributed bristles. The flowers develop from the pseudocephalium; these are tubular in shape, approximately 5.2 cm long and 3.5 cm in diameter, and creamy white in color.

The fruits are white in color and remain inside the pseudocephalium as they mature.

== Distribution and habitat ==
Espostoa utcumbambensis is native to the Utcubamba river valley, in the department of Amazonas in northern Peru.

It is found primarily in desert or dry shrubland biomes, at altitudes from 1350 to 1950 meters above sea level. It grows on steep, rocky slopes associated with deciduous forests.

== Taxonomy ==
Espostoa utcubambensis was described by Graham J. Charles, who published this name in the scientific journal British Cactus & Succulent Journal 21: 69 in 2003.

Etymology

- Espostoa: The genus name honors Italian-Peruvian botanist Nicolás E. Esposto (1877–1942), who was a professor at the National University of Agriculture in Lima.
- utcubambensis: The specific epithet refers to the Utcubamba river, near which this species is found.

== Conservation status ==
On the IUCN Red List, Espostoa utcubambensis is classified as being "Least Concern" (LC); this is because its populations are not currently experiencing a significant decline, as well as the current lack of known significant threats.

== Cultivation ==
This species is cultivated primarily as an ornamental. It can be propagated vegetatively by cuttings, or by seed. It is rare in cultivation.

== Gallery ==
Plants in habitat in Ruinas de Macro, Amazonas, Peru

Plant size

Stems and pseudocephalia

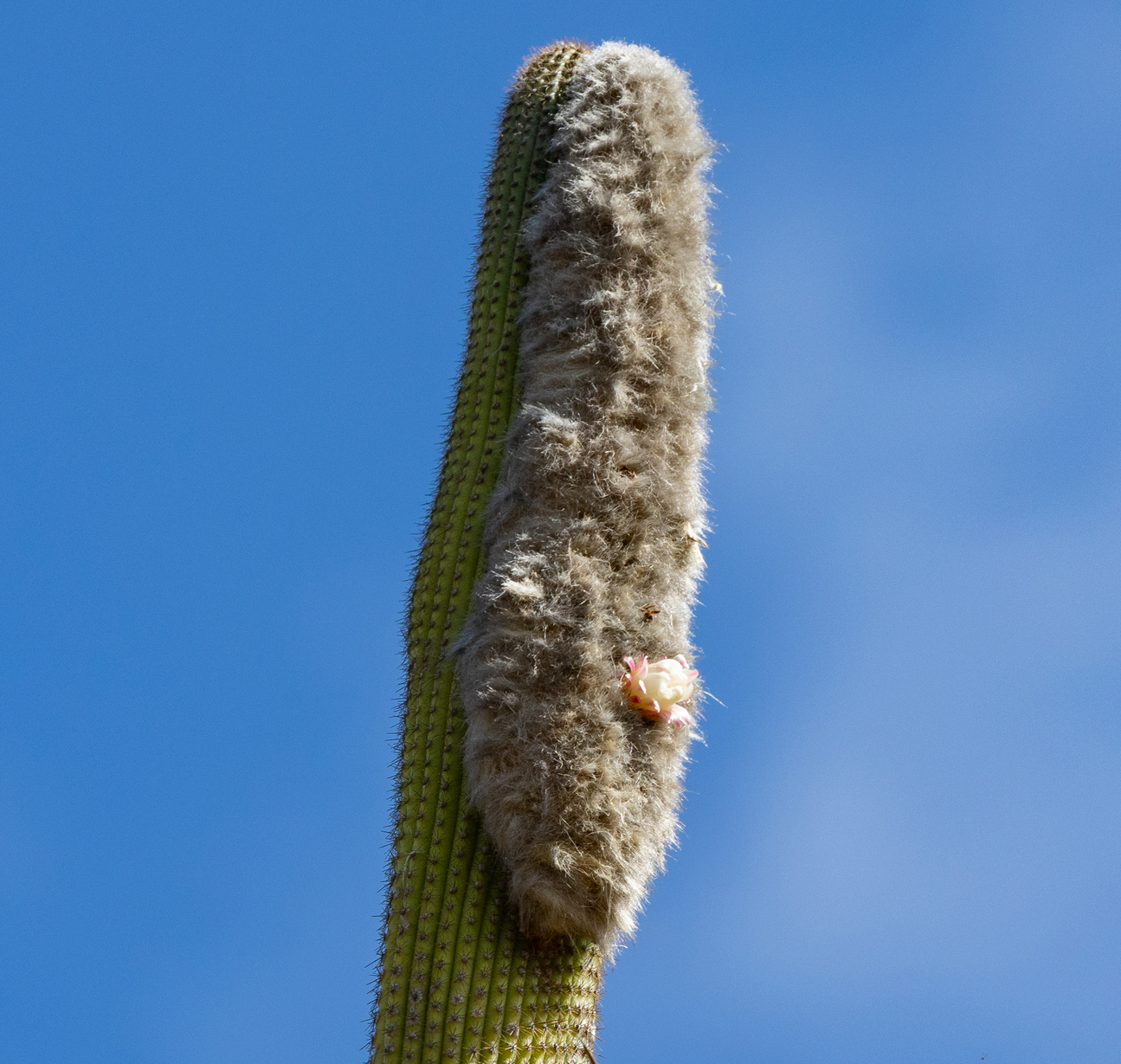
Pseudocephalium

Flowers
