= Espostoa blossfeldiorum =

Conservation status
- Least Concern (IUCN 3.1)

Scientific classification
- Kingdom: Plantae
- Clade: Tracheophytes
- Clade: Angiosperms
- Clade: Eudicots
- Order: Caryophyllales
- Family: Cactaceae
- Subfamily: Cactoideae
- Genus: Espostoa
- Species: E. blossfeldiorum

Binomial name
- Espostoa blossfeldiorum (Werderm.) Buxb.

Synonyms
- Cephalocereus blossfeldiorum Werderm. (basionym); Cereus blossfeldiorum (Werderm.) Backeb.; Facheiroa blossfeldiorum (Werderm.) W.T.Marshall; Thrixanthocereus blossfeldiorum (Werderm.) Backeb.; Thrixanthocereus cullmannianus F.Ritter; Thrixanthocereus longispinus F.Ritter

Species of cactus

Espostoa blossfeldiorum is a species of succulent flowering plant in the genus Espostoa, within the family Cactaceae. It is endemic to northern Peru, where it is found in the departments of Cajamarca, Piura, and Amazonas.

== Descriptions ==
Espostoa blossfeldiorum is a species of cactus with a usually-unbranched growth form, although it may occasionally develop a few branches at the base. It grows to a height of 3 to 4 meters, and forms columnar stems which measure 5 to 10 cm in diameter with a light green epidermis.

Stem with pseudocephalium

This species has 18 to 25 ribs which measure approximately 5 mm in height and are markedly rounded. These have incisions above the areoles, as well as slight prominences below them, in many cases. The areoles are spaced very closely together, with a separation of approximately 5 mm and a diameter of approximately 2 mm. When young, they are covered in off-white woolly trichomes; these disappear with age to the point of the areoles eventually becoming completely glabrous.

Each areole has 20 to 25 radial spines, which project outwards and often intertwine laterally. These spines are fine, needle-shaped, straight, and glassy white in color; they measure 6 to 8 mm in length. There is often only 1 central spine per areole, although there may occasionally be up to 4; these can reach almost 3 cm in length, and have a subsubulate shape (sharp point; thickened at the base); they are pointed outwards or slightly upwards, and are powdery black to gray in color, with a black tip.

Plant in growth

The pseudocephalium occupies 4 to 8 ribs. It grows to a length of up to 40 cm and a width of 3 to 4 cm. It is made up of dense groups of glassy-white bristles which measure 4 to 5 cm in length, as well as rust-colored or black spines (which are of a similar length or slightly longer) and short, dense, white-yellow wool.

The flowers are slender and funnel-shaped; they are cream-yellow in color. They have an unpleasant scent. They measure 6 to 7 cm in length and up to 5 cm in diameter. The fruits are dark green in color, and measure up to 3 cm in length and approximately 2.5 cm in diameter.

== Distribution and habitat ==
Espostoa blossfeldiorum is native to northern Peru, specifically to the system of valleys of the Marañón River. Its presence has been documented in the provinces of Jaén and Celendín (in the department of Cajamarca) as well as in the provice of Huancabamba (in the department of Piura) and in the area near Balsas (in the department of Amazonas).

This species primarily inhabits arid and semi-arid environments, such as desert or dry shrubland, although it is also found in transitional areas between dry and more humid environments. It is found at altitudes of 500 to 2000 meters above sea level in dry montane forests and cloud forests, where it grows within relatively-dense vegetation; it is able to adapt to various humidity and temperature levels.

== Taxonomy ==
This species was first described as Cephalocereus blossfeldiorum, a name published in 1937 by the German botanist Erich Werdermann in the scientific journal Kakteenkunde 1937: 4.

Later, the Austrian botanist Franz Buxbaum transferred it to the genus Espostoa, renaming it Espostoa blossfeldiorum. He registered these changes in the scientific journal Oesterreichische Botanische Zeitschrift, 106: 155, published in 1959.

Etymology

- Espostoa: the genus name honors Italian-Peruvian botanist Nicolás E. Esposto (1877–1942), who was a professor at the National University of Agriculture in Lima.
- blossfeldiorum: the specific epithet honors the discoverer of this species, the German botanist Harry Blossfeld (1913–1986), as well as his father, the German horticulturalist Robert Blossfeld (1882–1945), who made his son's expedition to South America possible

== Conservation status ==
On the IUCN Red List, Espostoa blossfeldiorum is classified as being of Least Concern (LC), signifying that it has a relatively wide range and populations which do not presently appear to be in significant decline. Currently, there are no known relevant threats to the species' survival, nor do there appear to be direct pressures related to habitat loss, land overexploitation, or poaching.

== Cultivation ==
This species is primarily cultivated as an ornamental. It may be propagated via seed or cuttings.

== Gallery ==
Plants in habitat in Jaén, Cajamarca, Peru

Growth form

Pseudocephalium

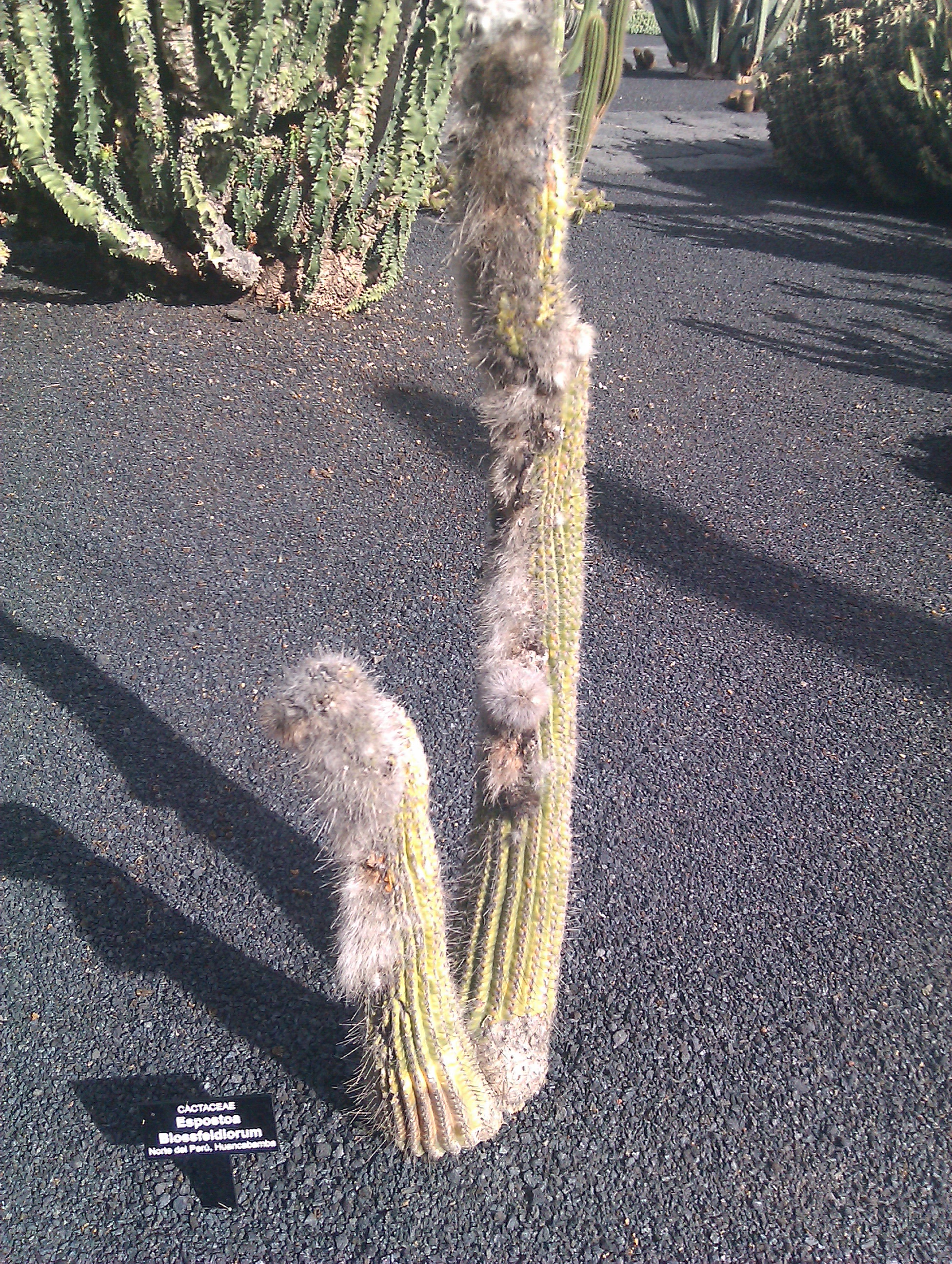
Plant in the Jardín de Cactus de Lanzarote, Canary Islands, Spain

In cultivation
