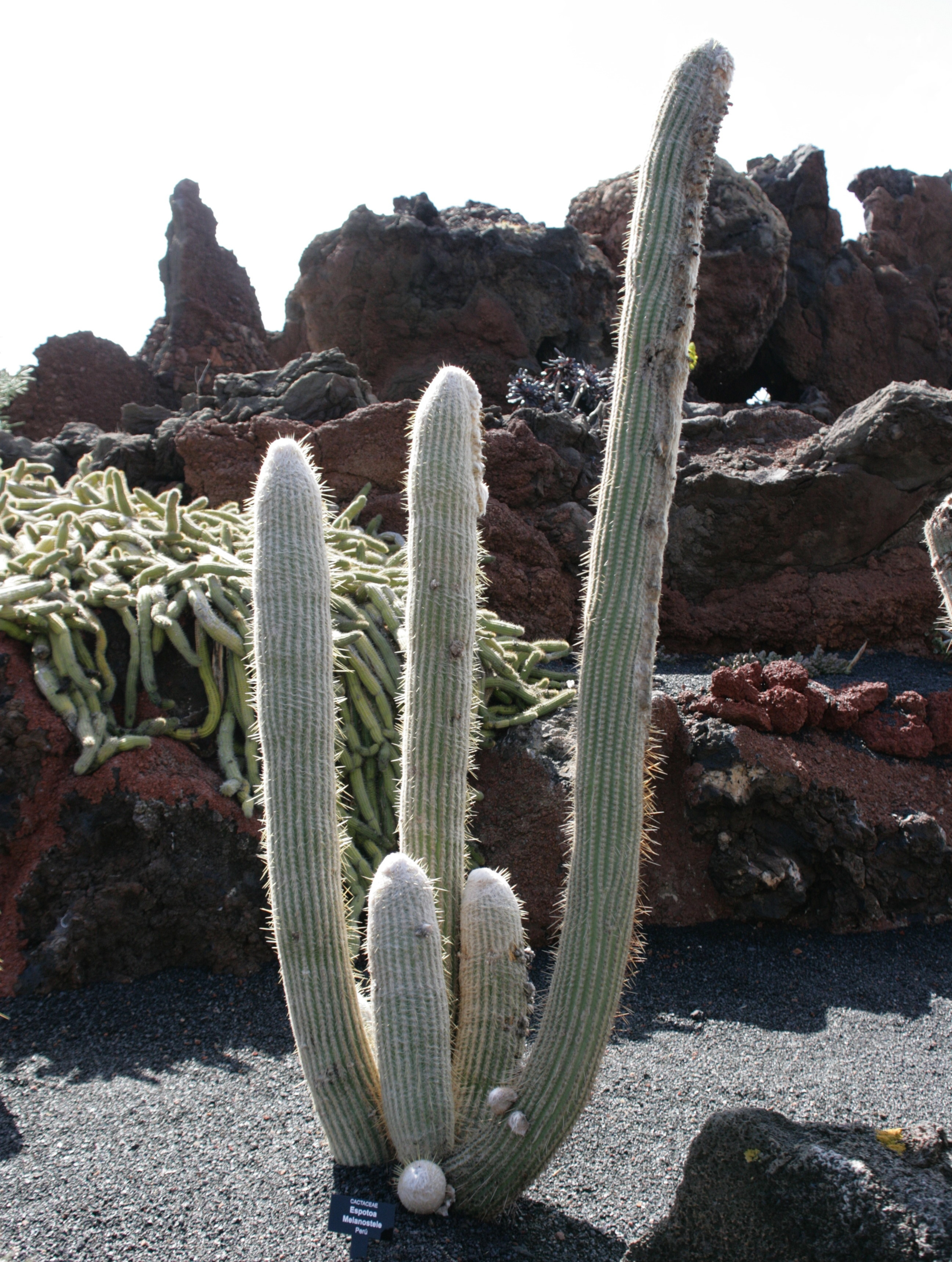

Scientific classification
- Kingdom: Plantae
- Clade: Tracheophytes
- Clade: Angiosperms
- Clade: Eudicots
- Order: Caryophyllales
- Family: Cactaceae
- Subfamily: Cactoideae
- Genus: Espostoa
- Species: E. melanostele

Binomial name
- Espostoa melanostele (Vaupel) Borg

Synonyms
- Binghamia melanostele (Vaupel) Britton & Rose; Cephalocereus melanostele Vaupel; Cereus melanostele (Vaupel) A.Berger; Echinopsis melanostele (Vaupel) Molinari; Pseudoespostoa melanostele (Vaupel) Backeb.

= Espostoa melanostele =

Species of plant

Espostoa melanostele is a species of long-lived, slow-growing flowering plant in the family Cactaceae.

== Conservation status ==
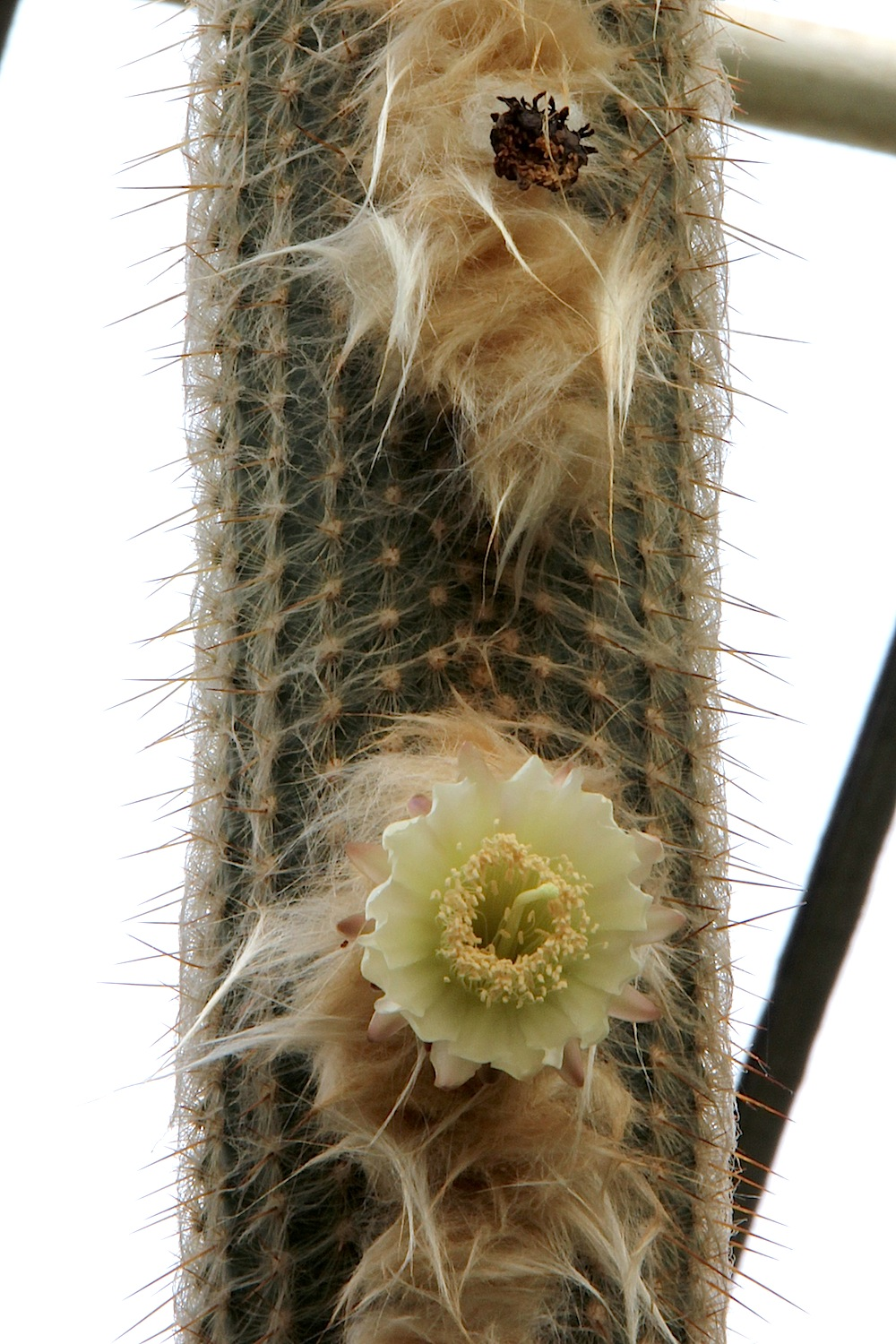
Flower

In 2011 the plant was listed by the IUCN's Red List as Status of Least Concern.

== Drought tolerance ==
This xerophyte is tolerant of most droughts when mature.

=== Subspecies ===
- Espostoa melanostele subsp. melanostele
- Espostoa melanostele subsp. nana (F.Ritter) G.J.Charles synonym Espostoa nana F.Ritter

== Uses ==
The plant is not only used for its fruit, but also grown for decorative qualities, such as its yellow flowers and its white ''fleece''.

== Hazards ==
The spines may be considered a hazard to children, but actually come off the skin very easily with proper handling.
