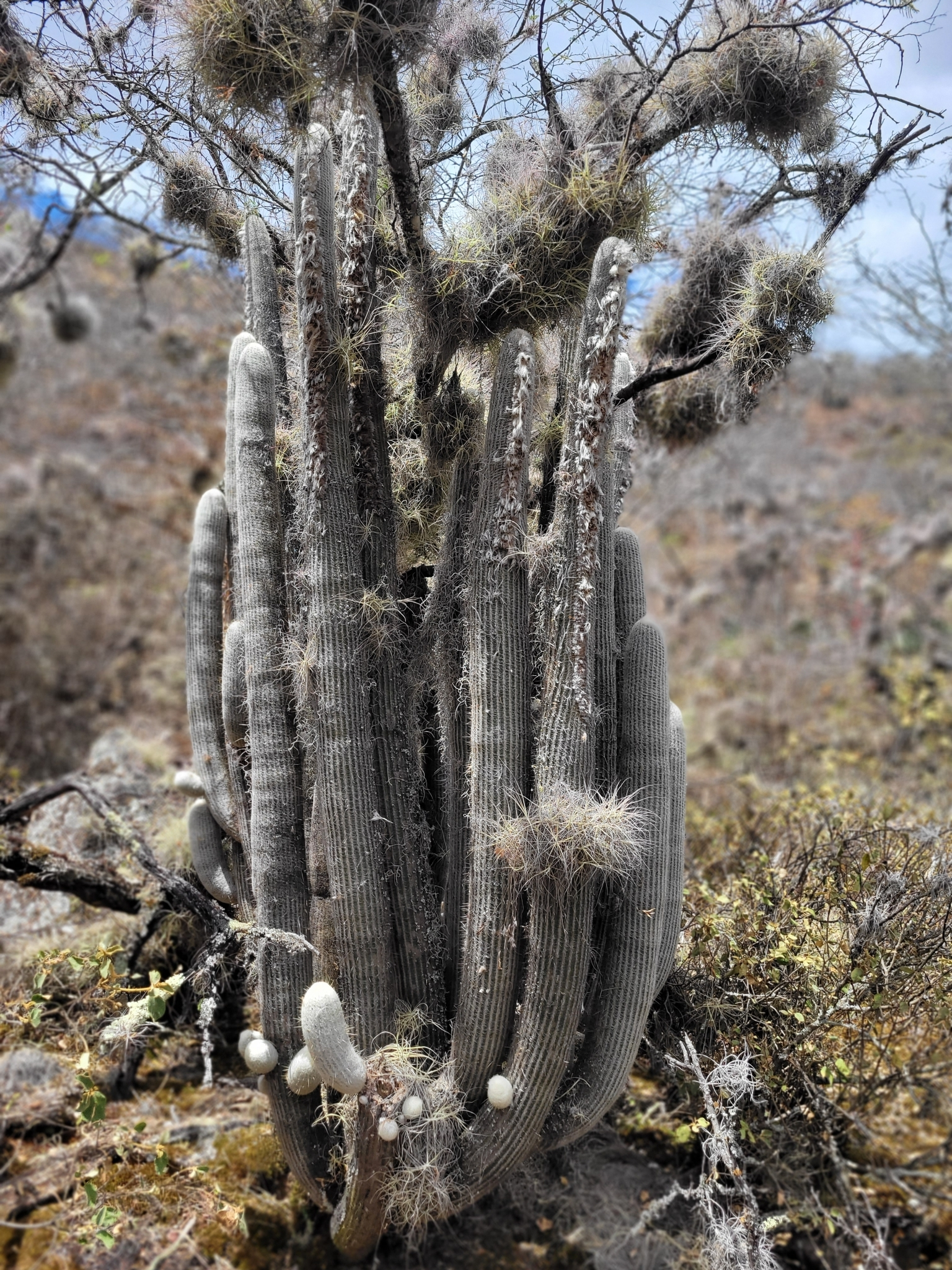
- In Ecuador

Conservation status
- Near Threatened (IUCN 3.1)

Scientific classification
- Kingdom: Plantae
- Clade: Tracheophytes
- Clade: Angiosperms
- Clade: Eudicots
- Order: Caryophyllales
- Family: Cactaceae
- Subfamily: Cactoideae
- Genus: Espostoa
- Species: E. frutescens

Binomial name
- Espostoa frutescens Madsen

= Espostoa frutescens =

Species of cactus

Espostoa frutescens is a species of flowering plant in the family Cactaceae.

== Description ==
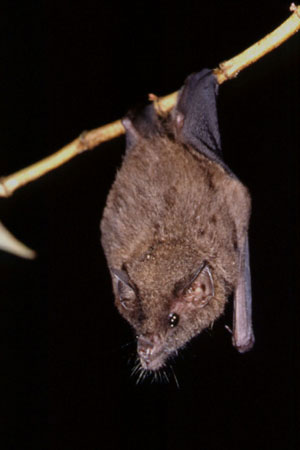
Geoffroy's tailless bat

Espostoa frutescens is a cactus that grows up to 2 meters tall, with branches emerging from its base. The upright shoots range from 0.5 to 2 meters in length and 6 to 10 centimeters in diameter. The plant has 22 to 28 low, rounded ribs with closely spaced, elliptical, light brown woolly areoles. It bears 40 or more light yellow, needle-like spines that are 4 to 8 millimeters long, sometimes with a single central spine 1 to 2.5 centimeters long. The cephalium, measuring 20 to 50 centimeters long, has five to seven ribs and is covered in light brown wool up to 3 centimeters long.

The funnel-shaped, white flowers are 4 to 4.5 centimeters long and 3.5 to 4 centimeters in diameter. The circular green fruits measure 1.6 to 2 centimeters in length and 1.5 to 2.5 centimeters in diameter. The species relies on nectar bats (including Geoffroy's tailless bat) for pollination. To facilitate the bats' echolocation, the plant's flowers are surrounded with a sound-absorbent furry area resulting in stronger flower echoes.

== Distribution and habitat ==
Espostoa frutescens is endemic to Ecuador and confined to Loja, El Oro and Azuay provinces. Its habitat is open areas in dry forests from 500 metres (1,600 ft) to 2,000 metres (6,600 ft) altitude.

== Taxonomy ==
This species was first described in 1989 by Jens E. Madsen.
