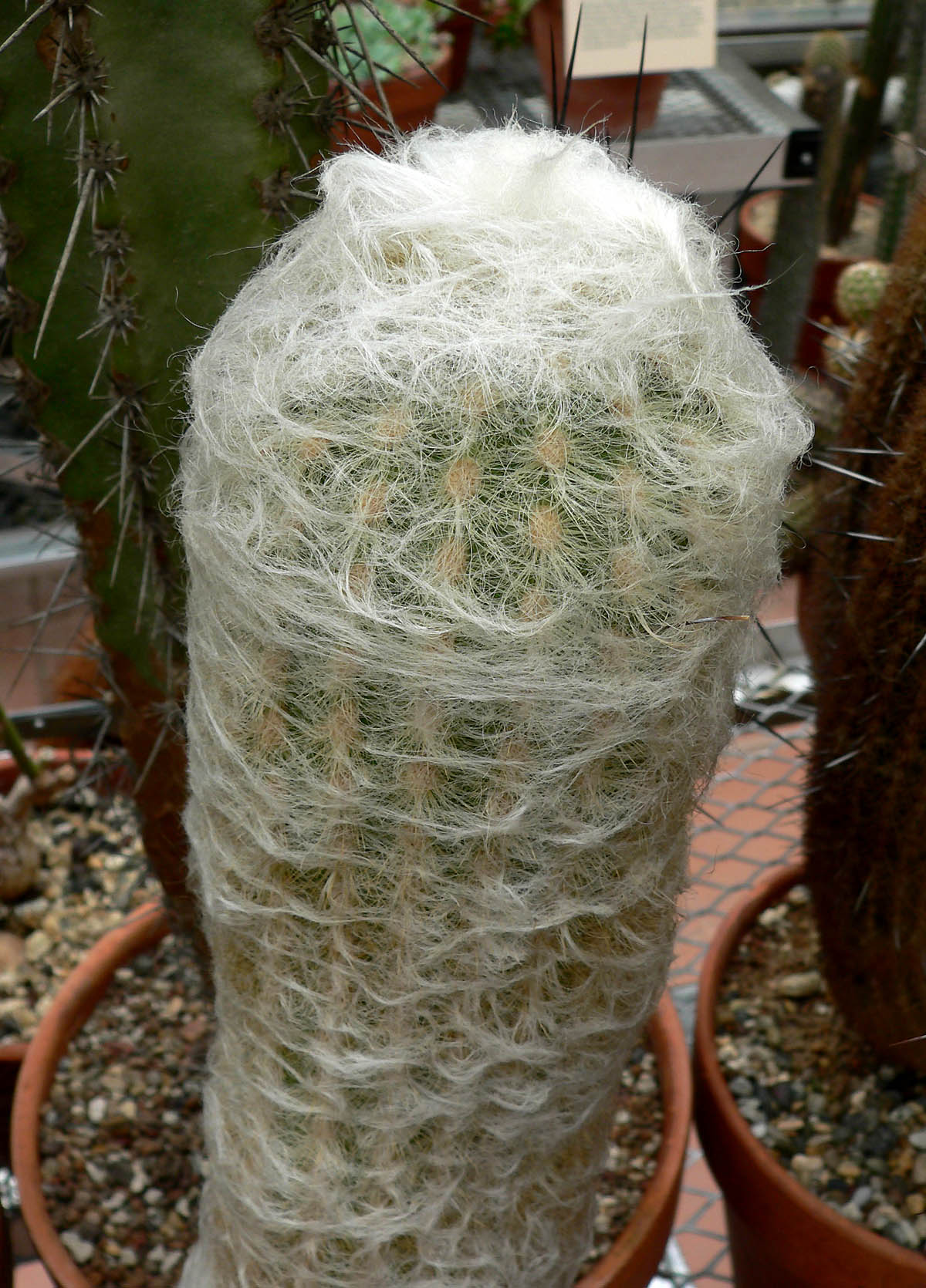
- Espostoa lanata var. gracilis

Scientific classification
- Kingdom: Plantae
- Clade: Tracheophytes
- Clade: Angiosperms
- Clade: Eudicots
- Order: Caryophyllales
- Family: Cactaceae
- Subfamily: Cactoideae
- Genus: Espostoa
- Species: E. lanata

Binomial name
- Espostoa lanata (Kunth, 1823) Britton & Rose, 1920

Synonyms
- Cactus lanatus Kunth

= Espostoa lanata =

Species of plant

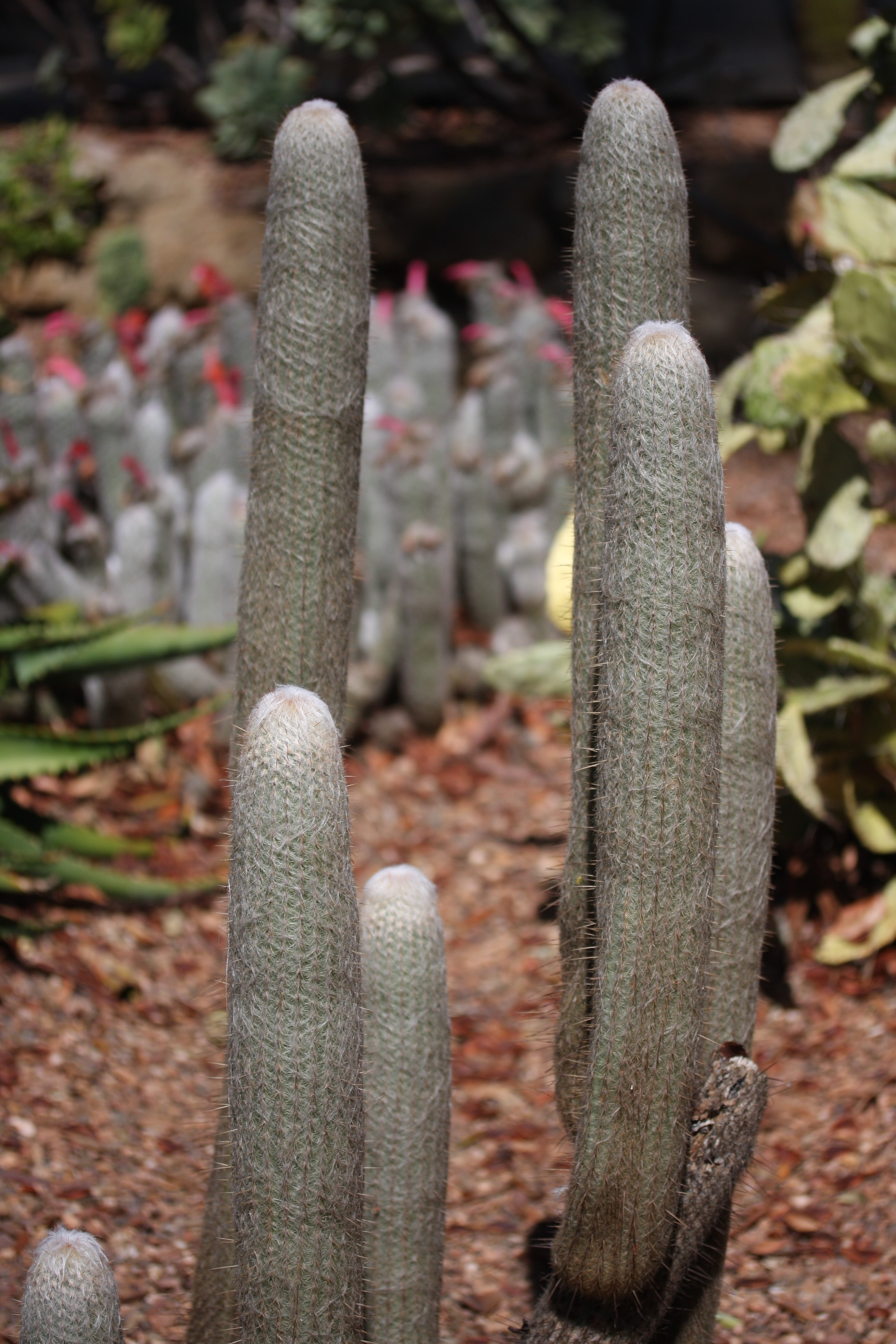
Espostoa lanata - Adelaide Botanic Gardens, South Australia.

Espostoa lanata is a species of flowering plant in the family Cactaceae.

Its common names include Peruvian old man cactus, cotton ball cactus, snowball cactus, and snowball old man cactus.

== Description ==
Espostoa lanata is a columnar cactus. It closely resembles Cephalocereus senilis from Mexico: it is a densely hairy species, covered by a warm woolly coat and well adapted to high altitudes. It is widespread in its habitat, and is quite variable in size and spines; for this reason it has received several names.

The plant is columnar in habit and can grow to be up to 7 meters tall in the wild, but only 3 meters when cultivated. The diameter is from 5 to 20 cm. There are 18 to 25 ribs. The ribs and the sharp central spines are mainly hidden by the woolly radial spines. It branches only after several years.

It flowers at night from a lateral cephalium after several years.

Woolly hairs have been used for pillow filling in Peru.

== Distribution ==
Espostoa lanata is native to southern Ecuador and northern Peru on the western slopes of the Andes mountains.

=== Subspecies ===
- Espostoa lanata subsp. lanata
- Espostoa lanata subsp. huanucoensis (H.Johnson ex F.Ritter) G.J.Charles synonym Espostoa huanucoensis F.Ritter
- Espostoa lanata subsp. lanianuligera (F.Ritter) G.J.Charles synonym Espostoa lanianuligera F.Ritter
- Espostoa lanata subsp. ruficeps (F.Ritter) G.J.Charles synonym Espostoa ruficeps F.Ritter

== Cultivation ==
Espostoa lanata is easy to grow. It needs fertile and well-drained soil. In summer, water the plants well but allow them to dry before watering again. Fertilize monthly with a balanced fertilizer.

In winter, keep it dry. This species is hardy to temperatures as low as −12 °C (10.4 ºF).

The exposure must be sunny in summer and at least luminous in winter.

In favorable conditions, it can grow 20 cm per year.
