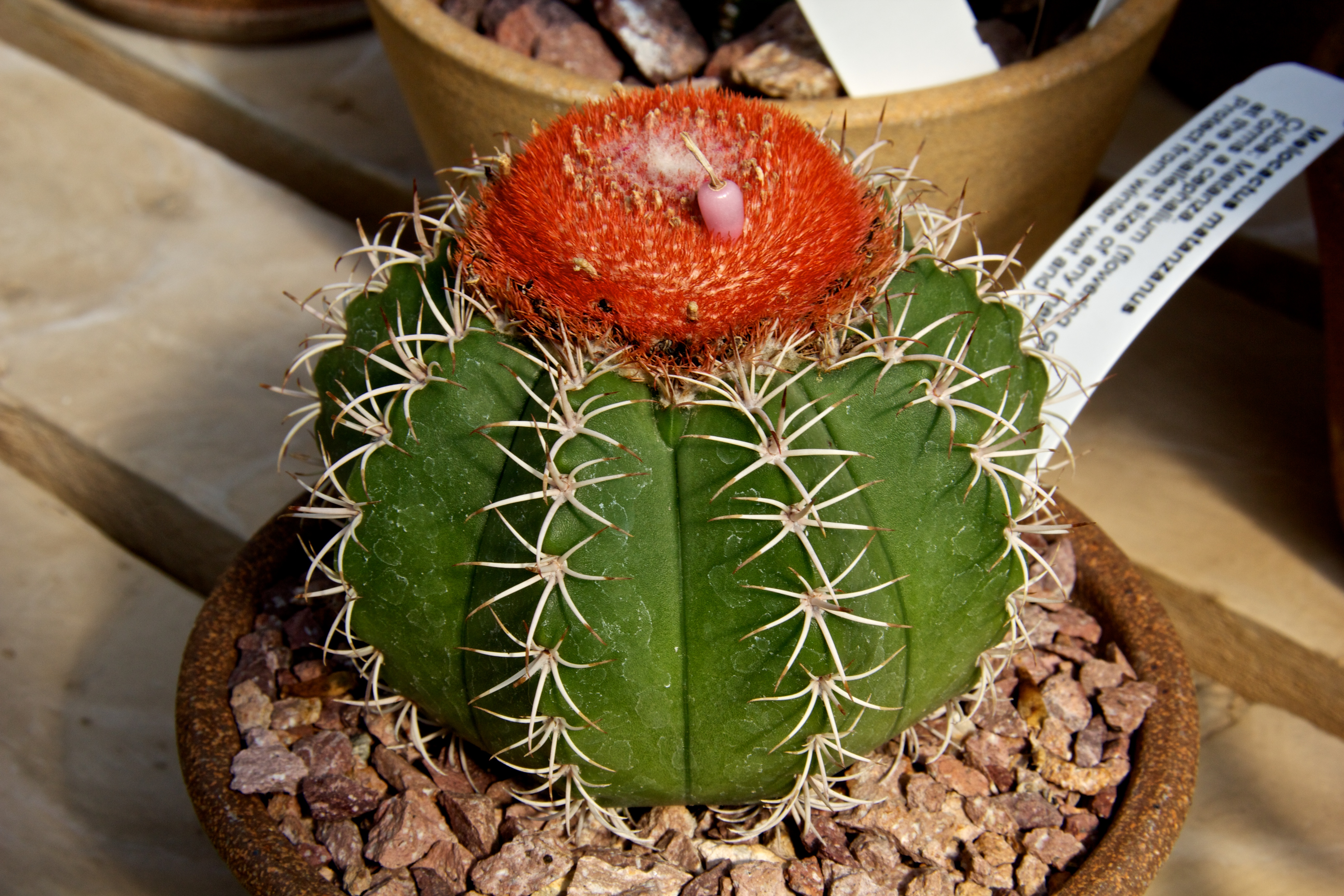
- At the Huntington Library

Scientific classification
- Kingdom: Plantae
- Clade: Tracheophytes
- Clade: Angiosperms
- Clade: Eudicots
- Order: Caryophyllales
- Family: Cactaceae
- Subfamily: Cactoideae
- Genus: Melocactus
- Species: M. matanzanus

Binomial name
- Melocactus matanzanus León

Synonyms
- Cactus matanzanus (León) Borg; Melocactus actinacanthus Areces; Melocactus matanzanus subsp. actinacanthus (Areces) Guiggi

= Melocactus matanzanus =

Species of cactus

Melocactus matanzanus, common name dwarf Turk's-cap cactus or Turk's-cap cactus, is a cactus in the family Cactaceae. The specific epithet matanzanus is derived from the Cuban province of Matanzas.

== Description ==
Melocactus matanzanus is a perennial fleshy globose plant. It can reach a height of 70–90 mm (2 3/4–3 1/2 in) and a diameter of 80–90 mm (3 1/4–3 1/2 in). On the bright green body there are 8–9 (or more) ribs. The thorns are brownish-gray or white. The central spine is up to 50 mm (2 in) long, while the 7 to 8 radial spines are 30–50 mm (1 1/4–2 in) long.

When the plant has reached a certain age it shows at the growing tip a cephalium (hence the common name of "Turk's Cap"), a globose structure covered with reddish-brown bristles. This structure, where the flower buds will form, reaches a height of up to 90 mm (3 1/2 in) and a diameter of 50–60 mm (2–2 1/2 in). The flowers are carmine, about 50 mm (2 in) long.

== Distribution ==
This plant is native to the north-central area of Cuba. It is a popular and desirable species throughout the world as an ornamental plant.
