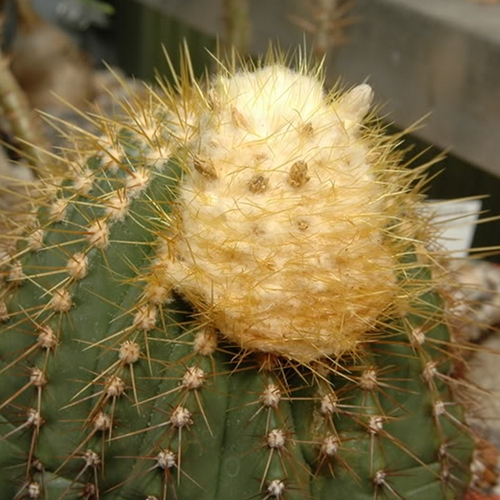
- Coleocephalocereus aureus

Scientific classification
- Kingdom: Plantae
- Clade: Tracheophytes
- Clade: Angiosperms
- Clade: Eudicots
- Order: Caryophyllales
- Family: Cactaceae
- Subfamily: Cactoideae
- Tribe: Cereeae
- Subtribe: Cereinae
- Genus: Coleocephalocereus; Backeb.

Type species
- Coleocephalocereus fluminensis

Species
- See text.

Synonyms
- Buiningia Buxb.; Mariottia Guiggi; Siccobaccatus P.J.Braun & Esteves

= Coleocephalocereus =

Genus of cacti

Coleocephalocereus is a genus of erect and semi-erect columnar cacti from Brazil. These species develop a cephalium with wool and bristles. They are common to the inselbergs of the Brazilian Atlantic rainforest, and can comprise a dominant portion of the flora in these isolated, dome-shaped rocky outcrops.

== Species ==
As of September 2026, Plants of the World Online accepted the following species:

| Image | Scientific name | Distribution |
|---|---|---|
| | Coleocephalocereus aureus F.Ritter | Brazil (Minas Gerais) |
| | Coleocephalocereus braunii Diers & Esteves | Brazil (Minas Gerais) |
| | Coleocephalocereus buxbaumianus Buining | Brazil (Minas Gerais) |
| | Coleocephalocereus decumbens F.Ritter | Brazil (Minas Gerais) |
| | Coleocephalocereus dolichospermaticus (Buining & Brederoo) N.P.Taylor | Brazil (SSW Bahia, NW Minas Gerais) |
| | Coleocephalocereus fluminensis (Miq.) Backeb. | Brazil (Espirito Santo, Minas Gerais, Rio de Janeiro, São Paulo) |
| | Coleocephalocereus goebelianus (Vaupel) Buining | Brazil (Bahia) |
| | Coleocephalocereus pluricostatus Buining & Brederoo | Brazil (Espirito Santo, Minas Gerais) |
| | Coleocephalocereus purpureus (Buining & Brederoo) F.Ritter | Brazil (Minas Gerais) |
| | Coleocephalocereus superbus N.P.Taylor & Olsthoorn | Brazil (Minas Gerais) |
