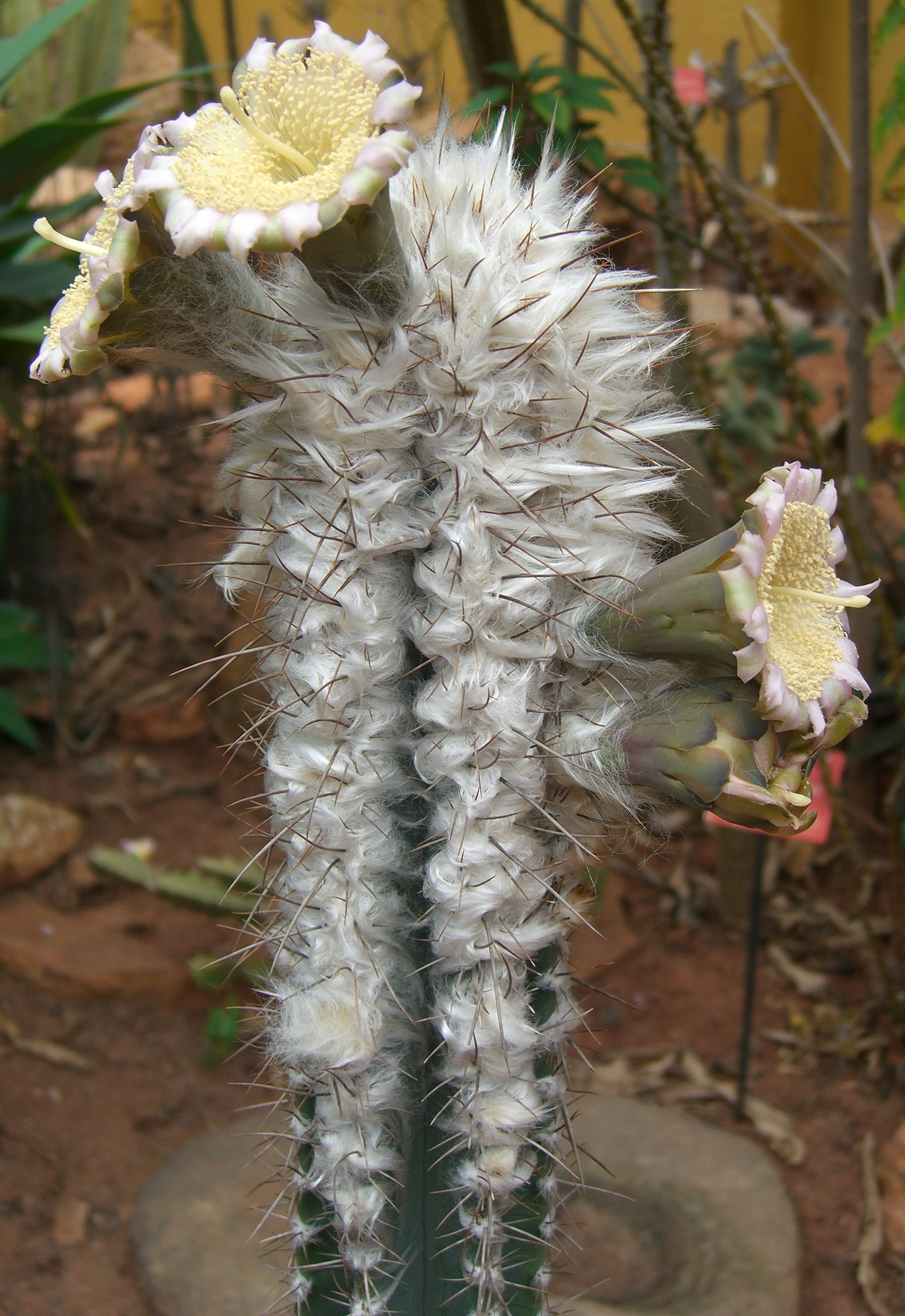

Scientific classification
- Kingdom: Plantae
- Clade: Embryophytes
- Clade: Tracheophytes
- Clade: Angiosperms
- Clade: Eudicots
- Order: Caryophyllales
- Family: Cactaceae
- Subfamily: Cactoideae
- Genus: Pilosocereus
- Species: P. leucocephalus

Binomial name
- Pilosocereus leucocephalus (Poselg.) Byles & G.D.Rowley

Synonyms
- List: Cephalocereus cometes (Scheidw.) Britton & Rose; Cephalocereus leucocephalus (Poselg.) Britton & Rose; Cephalocereus leucocephalus f. cristatus P.V.Heath; Cephalocereus maxonii Rose; Cephalocereus palmeri Rose; Cephalocereus palmeri f. cristatus P.V.Heath; Cephalocereus sartorianus Rose; Cephalocereus tehuacanus (Weing.) Borg; Cephalophorus palmeri (Rose) Boom; Cereus cometes Scheidw.; Cereus flavicomus Salm-Dyck; Cereus houlletii (Lem.) Mottet; Cereus jubatus Salm-Dyck ex C.F.Först.; Cereus maxonii (Rose) Vaupel; Cereus tehuacanus (Weing.) Werderm.; Cereus victoriensis Vaupel; Pilocereus cometes (Scheidw.) Mittler ex C.F.Först.; Pilocereus flavicomus (Salm-Dyck) C.F.Först. & Rümpler; Pilocereus forsteri Sencke ex Lem.; Pilocereus houlletii Lem.; Pilocereus jubatus Salm-Dyck; Pilocereus leucocephalus Poselg.; Pilocereus marschalleckianus Zeiss.; Pilocereus marschalleckianus var. picta Zeiss.; Pilocereus maxonii (Rose) A.Berger; Pilocereus palmeri (Rose) F.M.Knuth; Pilocereus sartorianus A.Berger; Pilocereus tehuacanus Weing.; Pilosocereus cometes (Scheidw.) Byles & G.D.Rowley; Pilosocereus leucocephalus subsp. palmeri (Rose) Scheinvar; Pilosocereus maxonii (Rose) Byles & G.D.Rowley; Pilosocereus palmeri (Rose) Byles & G.D.Rowley; Pilosocereus palmeri var. sartorianus (Rose) Lodé; Pilosocereus palmeri var. victoriensis (Vaupel) Backeb.; Pilosocereus sartorianus (Rose) Byles & G.D.Rowley; Pilosocereus tehuacanus (Weing.) Byles & G.D.Rowley

= Pilosocereus leucocephalus =

Species of cactus

Pilosocereus leucocephalus, called old man cactus (along with a number of similar species), old man of Mexico, tuno, and woolly torch, is a species of cactus in the genus Pilosocereus, native to Mexico and Central America. It has gained the Royal Horticultural Society's Award of Garden Merit. Pilosocereus leucocephalus functions as a keystone species in dry landscapes found in Mesoamerica. The fruit this cactus produces is relied upon as a source of hydration and sugar in arid areas by frugivores such as birds, bats, and even some reptiles.
