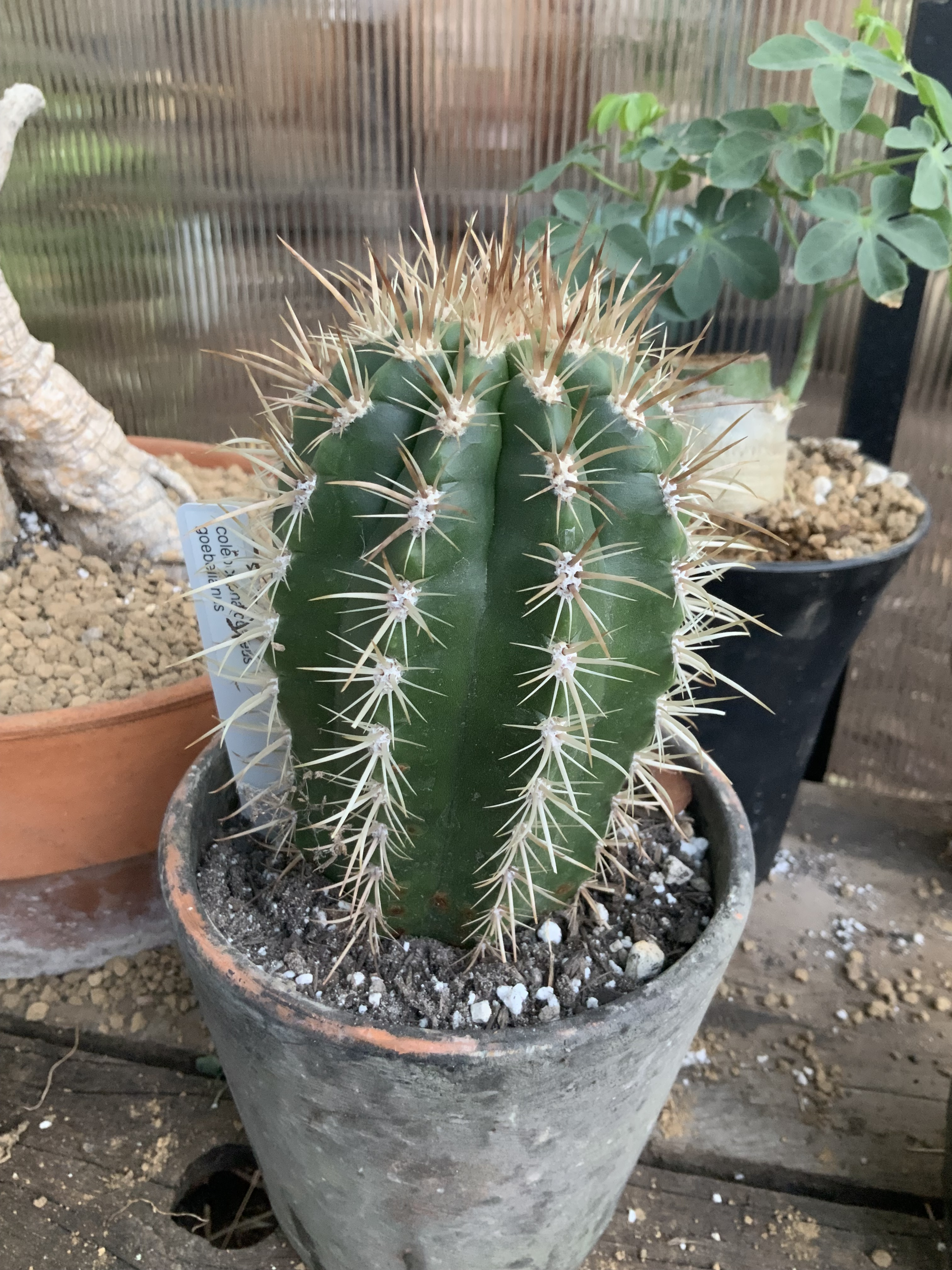

Conservation status
- Endangered (IUCN 3.1)

Scientific classification
- Kingdom: Plantae
- Clade: Tracheophytes
- Clade: Angiosperms
- Clade: Eudicots
- Order: Caryophyllales
- Family: Cactaceae
- Subfamily: Cactoideae
- Genus: Coleocephalocereus
- Species: C. goebelianus

Binomial name
- Coleocephalocereus goebelianus (Vaupel) Buining

Synonyms
- Cereus goebelianus Vaupel; Mariottia goebeliana (Vaupel) Guiggi; Micranthocereus goebelianus (Vaupel) Lodé; Coleocephalocereus pachystele F.Ritter

= Coleocephalocereus goebelianus =

Species of cactus

Coleocephalocereus goebelianus is an endangered species of plant in the family Cactaceae. It is endemic to Brazil, where it is confined to the state Minas Gerais and Bahia. Its natural habitat is the seasonally dry tropical forest.

Due to major differences to the rest of Coleocephalocereus, the monotypic genus Mariottia has been erected by Guiggi. However, this treatment is not accepted by most authorities.

== Description ==
Coleocephalocereus gobelianus is a tall columnar cactus growing up to 6 meters in height. Spines of this species are 1-2 inches long with a golden hue. Plants are usually single-stemmed, but can also be branched sometimes. Tightly packed golden hairs are present on the mature, flowering sized plants. Flowers are a whitish-yellow, and fruits are red.

== Distribution ==
Coleocephalocereus gobelianus is native to rocky outcrops in the state of Minas Gerais and Bahia.

== Gallery ==
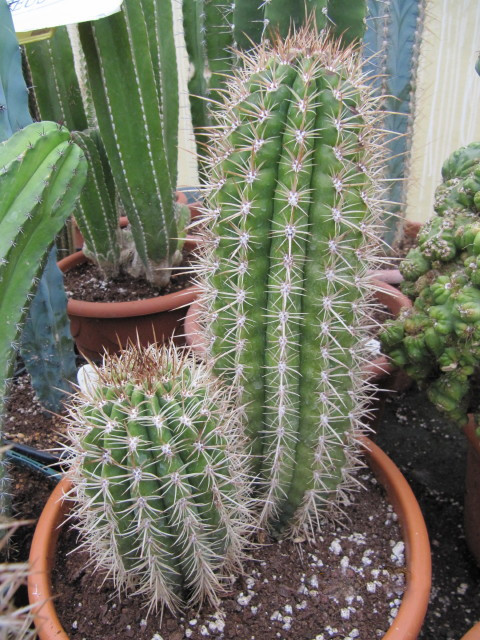
Cultivated plants

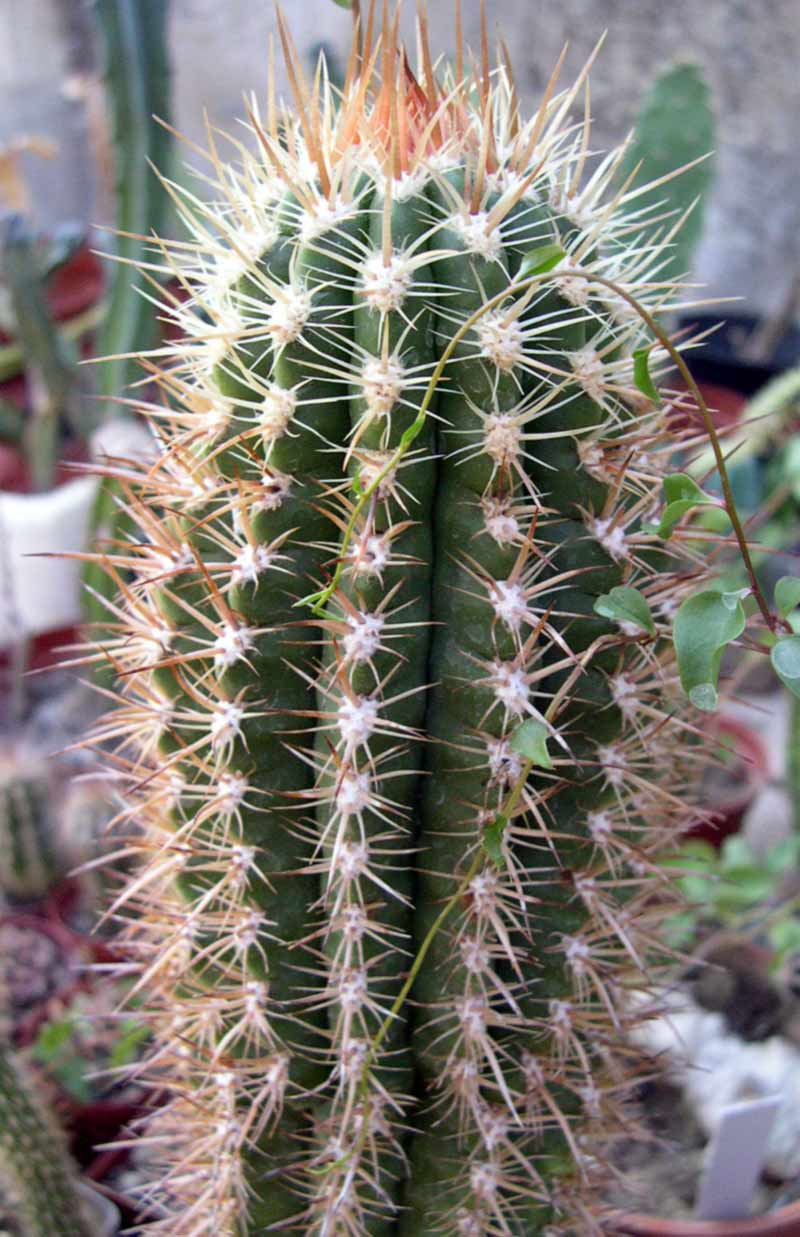
Cultivated plant

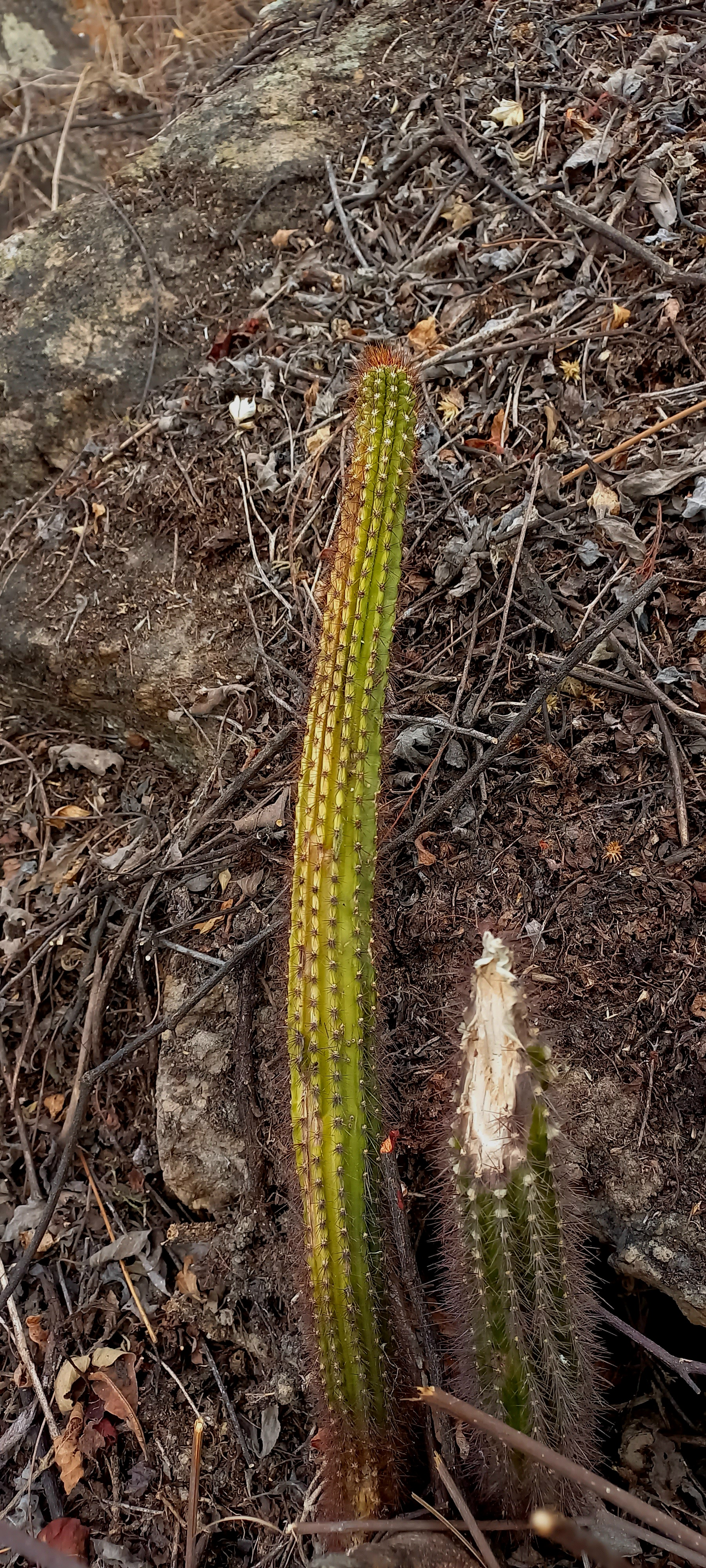
Wild plant without cephalium

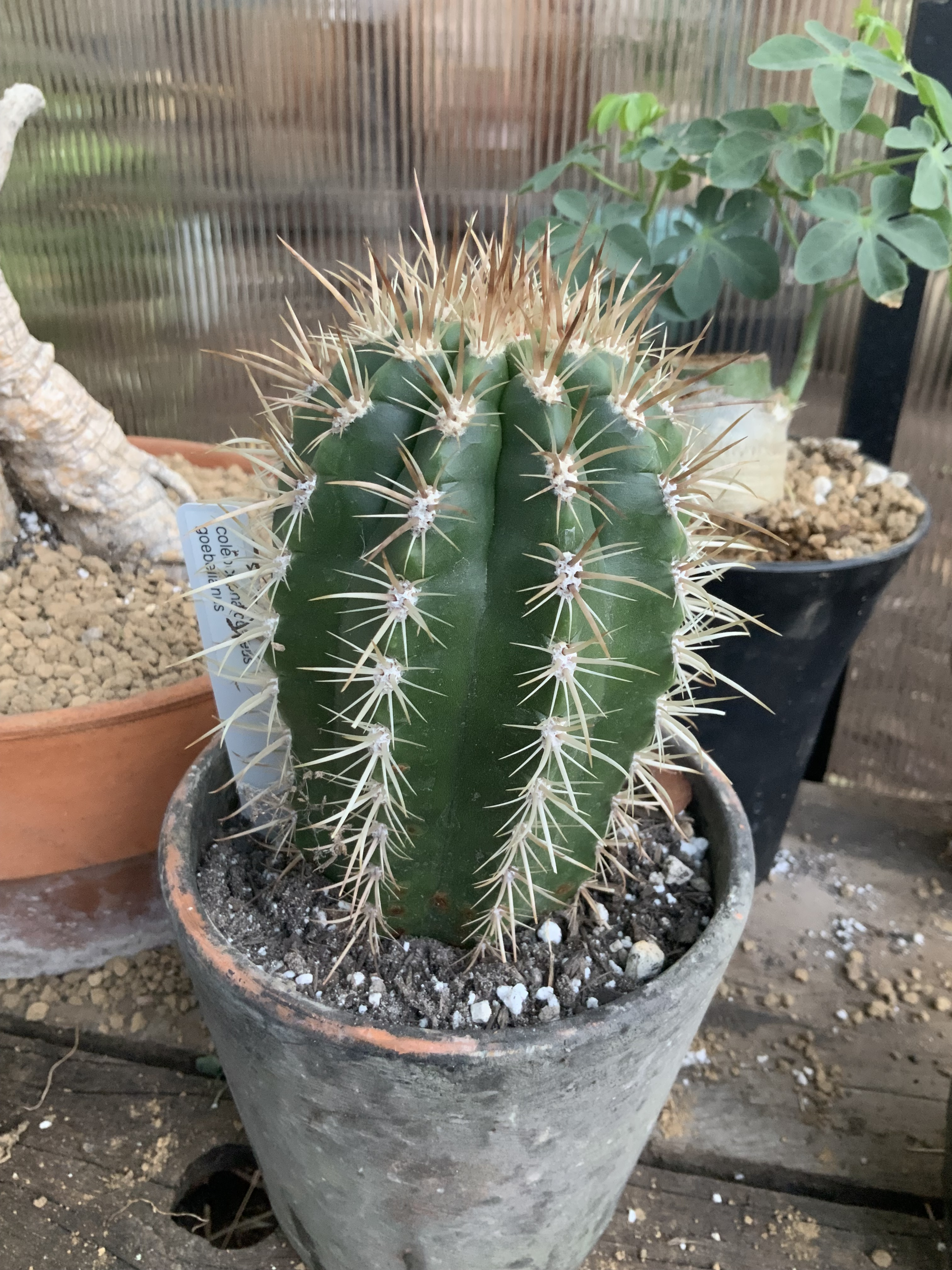
Cultivated plant from seed
