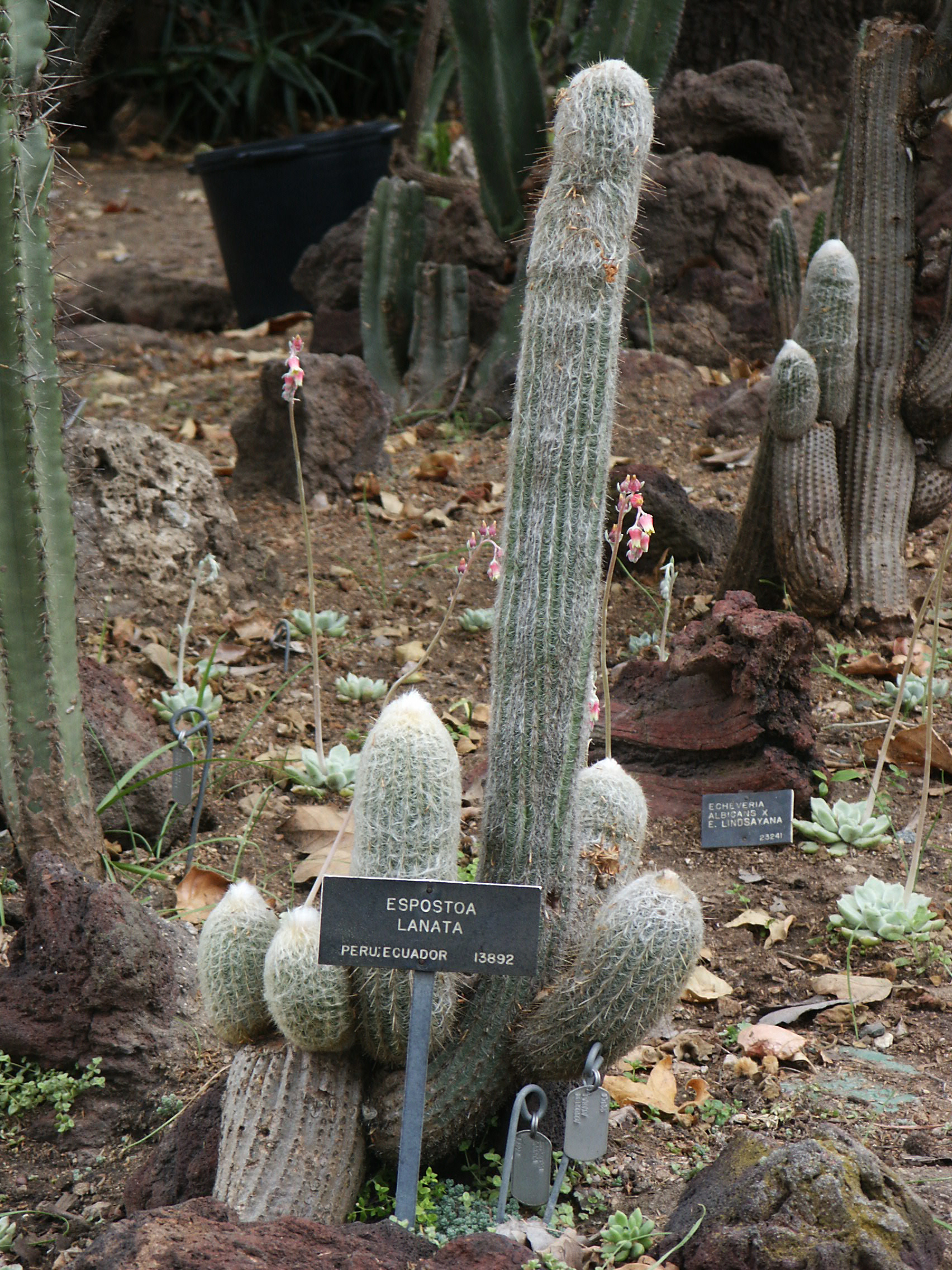
- Espostoa lanata

Scientific classification
- Kingdom: Plantae
- Clade: Tracheophytes
- Clade: Angiosperms
- Clade: Eudicots
- Order: Caryophyllales
- Family: Cactaceae
- Subfamily: Cactoideae
- Tribe: Cereeae
- Subtribe: Trichocereinae
- Genus: Espostoa; Britton & Rose

Type species
- Espostoa lanata

Species
- See text.

Synonyms
- Binghamia Britton & Rose, nom. illeg.; Pseudoespostoa Backeb.; Thrixanthocereus Backeb.

= Espostoa =

Genus of plants

Espostoa is a genus of columnar cacti, comprising 16 species known from the Andes of southern Ecuador and Peru. It usually lives at an altitude of between 800 m and 2500 m. Its fruit is edible, sweet, and juicy. The genus is named after Nicolas E. Esposto, a renowned botanist from Lima.

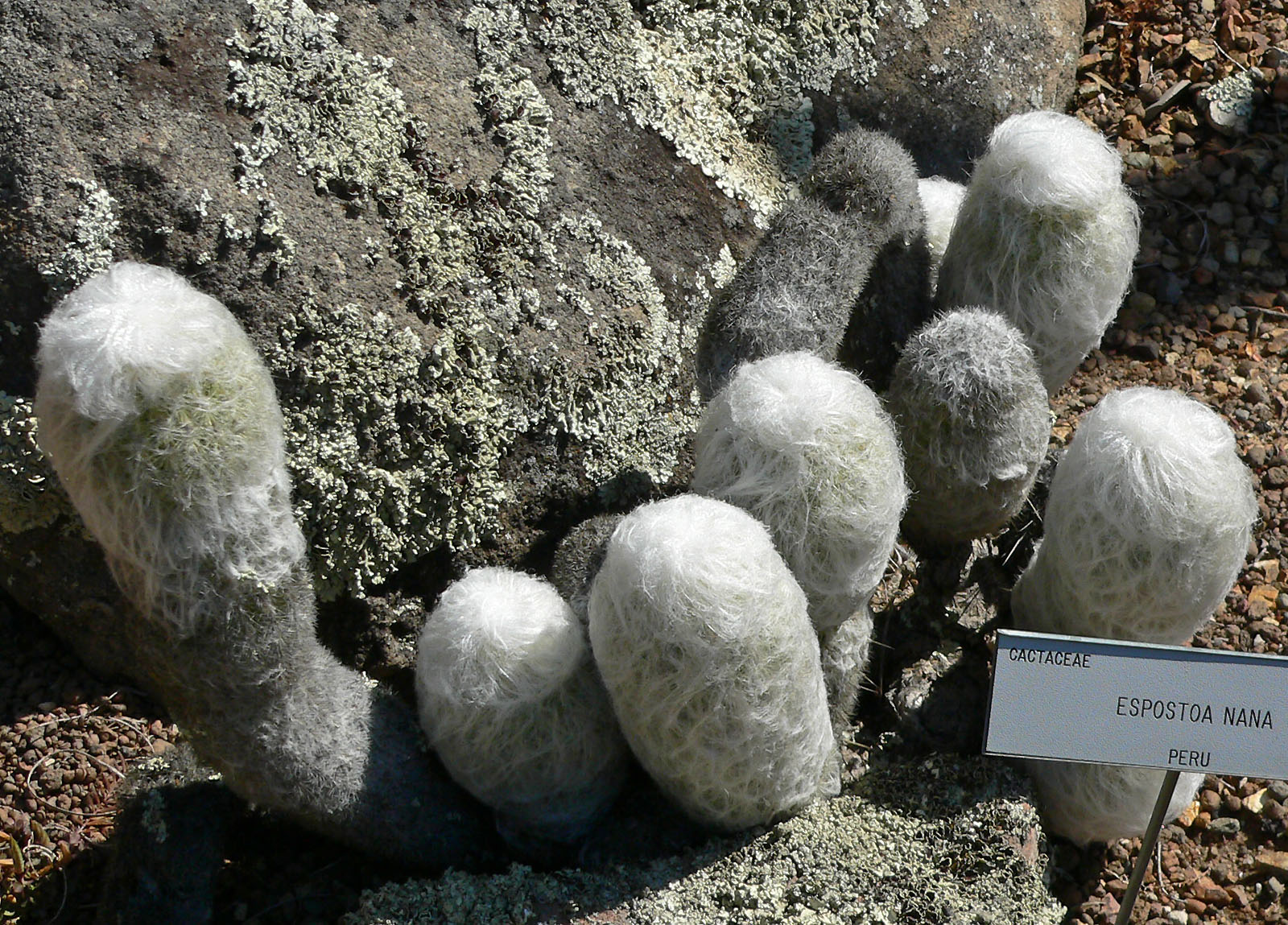
Espostoa melanostele subsp. nana

== Description ==
Members of this genus are similar to those in the Mexican genus Cephalocereus. They have pink-white flowers, and are covered with spines and white hair. In adulthood, a cephalium sometimes appears, similar to the Mexican genus Cephalocereus. Only the older specimens can divide. The cephalium is elongated and forms along the outer side of each column facing away from the center of the plant. This kind of inflorescence is unique to the cactus family.

== Taxonomy ==
They were discovered by Alexander von Humboldt and Aimé Bonpland in the early nineteenth century.

They are appreciated for their decorative qualities due to their white fleece. They can be propagated by seed. For full development they must be planted in the ground. The cultivated specimens very rarely flourish.

Like all cacti, Espostoa requires a sunny location and well-drained soil. But in summer, it appreciates fertilizer and wetter conditions. In winter, it needs a rest, but the temperature must not drop below 12 °C.

=== Species list ===
As of October 2026, Plants of the World Online accepted the following species:

Image	Scientific name	Distribution
	Espostoa blossfeldiorum (Werderm.) Buxb.	Peru
	Espostoa calva F.Ritter	Peru (Amazonas)
	Espostoa cremnophila Hoxey	Peru
	Espostoa frutescens Madsen	Ecuador
	Espostoa hylaea F.Ritter	Peru (Amazonas)
	Espostoa lanata (Kunth) Britton & Rose	Ecuador, Peru
	Espostoa melanostele (Vaupel) Borg	Peru
	Espostoa mirabilis F.Ritter	Peru (Amazonas, Cajamarca, La Libertad)
	Espostoa senilis (F.Ritter) N.P.Taylor	Peru (Ancash)
	Espostoa superba F.Ritter	Peru (Ancash)
	Espostoa utcubambensis G.J.Charles	Peru (Amazonas)

== Bibliography ==
- Innes C, Wall B (1995). Cacti' Succulents and Bromaliads. Cassell & The Royal Horticultural Society.
- Edward F. Anderson : "The Cactus Family" (2001)
