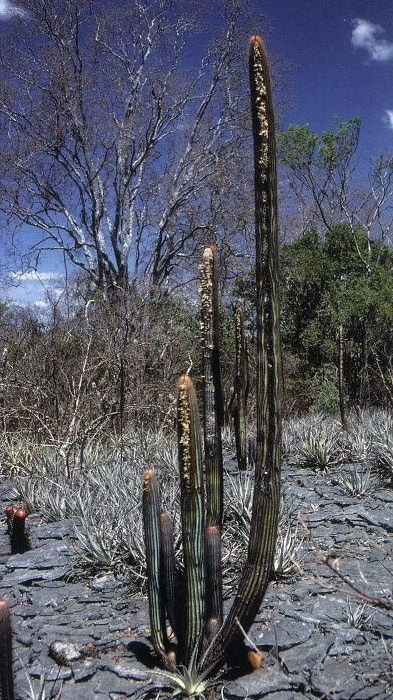

Conservation status
- Near Threatened (IUCN 3.1)

Scientific classification
- Kingdom: Plantae
- Clade: Tracheophytes
- Clade: Angiosperms
- Clade: Eudicots
- Order: Caryophyllales
- Family: Cactaceae
- Subfamily: Cactoideae
- Genus: Siccobaccatus
- Species: S. dolichospermaticus

Binomial name
- Siccobaccatus dolichospermaticus (Buining & Brederoo) P. J. Braun & Esteves

Synonyms
- Austrocephalocereus dolichospermaticus Buining & Brederoo 1974; Coleocephalocereus dolichospermaticus (Buining & Brederoo) N.P. Taylor; Micranthocereus dolichospermaticus(Buining & Brederoo) F.Ritter

= Siccobaccatus dolichospermaticus =

Species of cactus

Siccobaccatus dolichospermaticus is a species of plant in the family Cactaceae. It is endemic to Brazil, where it is confined to the states of Bahia and Minas Gerais. Its natural habitat is rocky areas. It is threatened by habitat loss.

== Description ==
Siccobaccatus dolichospermaticus features a bluish columnar shoot that can reach up to 2 meters in height and 8 centimeters in diameter. It has about 30 slightly humpbacked ribs, with oval areoles covered in bright brown wool. The plant has 6 to 8 straight, protruding central spines that are yellowish and turn gray with age, reaching up to 2.5 centimeters long. The numerous radial spines are 4 to 7 millimeters long. The cephalium can be up to 35 centimeters long and 65 centimeters wide, with white to cream-colored wool up to 4 centimeters long and bright red to dark red bristles up to 5 centimeters long. The cylindrical flowers, which are bright lilac to pink or orange-pink, open at night, measuring up to 2.5 centimeters long and 1.1 centimeters in diameter. The light pink, berry-like fruits are 1.8 centimeters long and 1.4 to 1.6 centimeters in diameter.

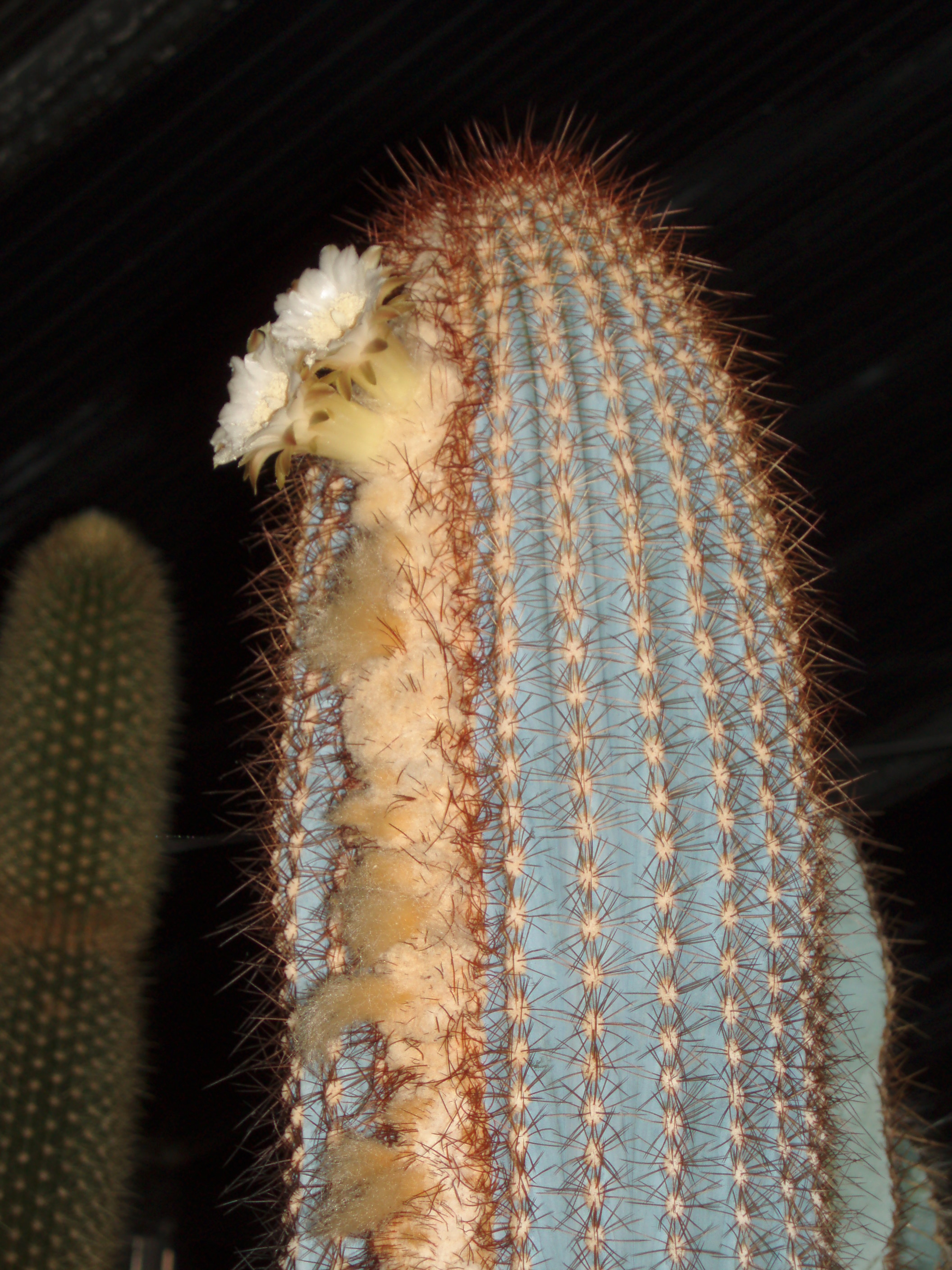
Siccobaccatus dolichospermaticus flowers

Young plant of Siccobaccatus dolichospermaticus

== Distribution ==
Siccobaccatus dolichospermaticus is found in the Brazilian state of Bahia, specifically around Bom Jesus de Lapa.

== Taxonomy ==
Originally described as Austrocephalocereus dolichospermaticus in 1974 by Albert Frederik Hendrik Buining and Arnold J. Brederoo, the species was renamed by Friedrich Ritter in 1979. The name dolichospermaticus comes from the Greek word "dolichos" (long) and the Latin word "spermaticus" (seed-related).
