= Cephalium =

Cactus structure

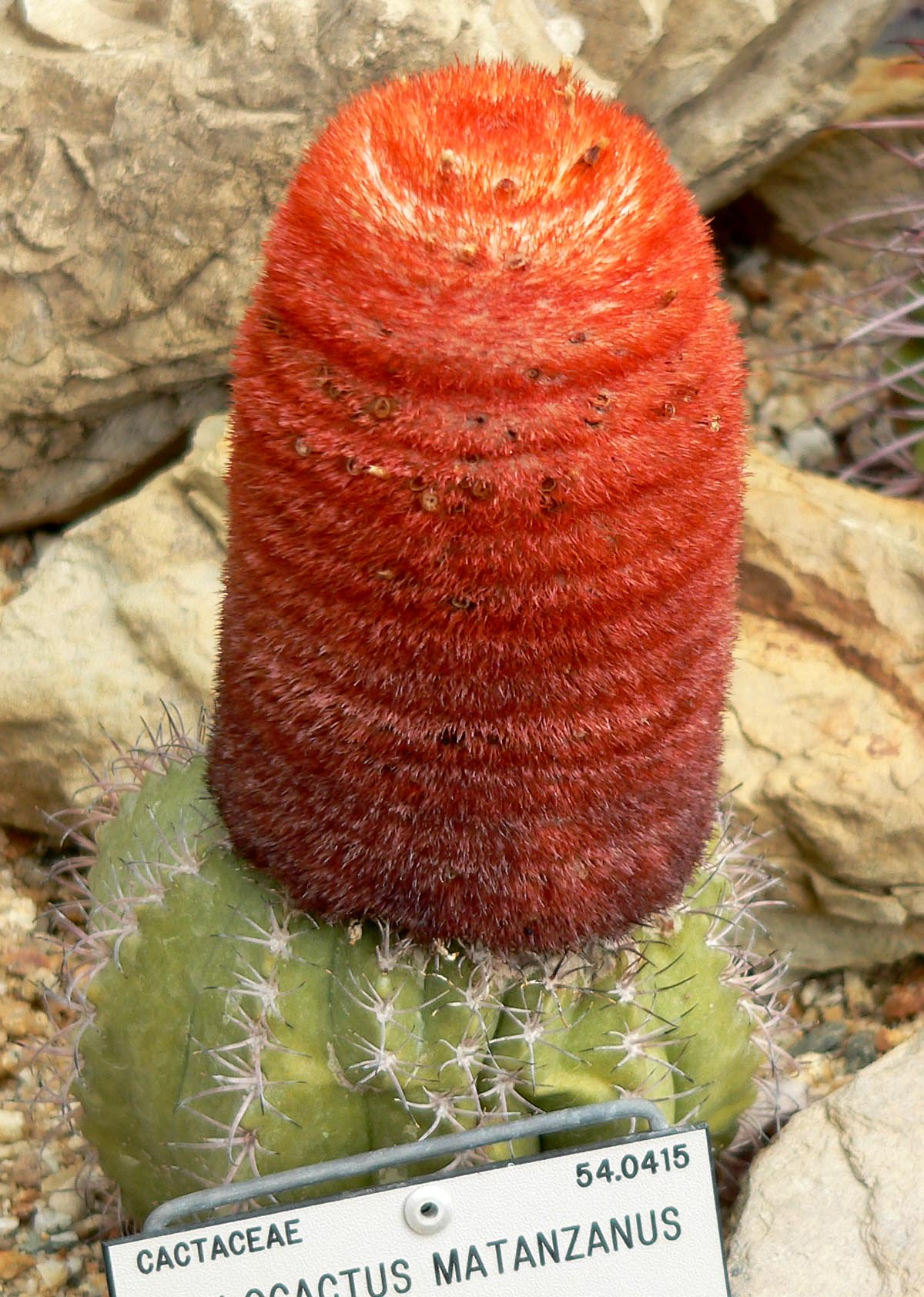
Cephalium atop Melocactus matanzanus

A cephalium is a growth that occurs in certain cacti at sexual maturity, that exhibits periderm development, reduced photosynthesis and denser spine production. The boundary between the juvenile plant and the cephalium is almost always a discrete one. Cephalia have historically been defined to occur only at the tips of the plant, although does not reflect the variety of sexual transition among species.

== History and etymology ==
The true origin of this word is unknown, though the word was first used by William Jackson Hooker without any elaboration to describe Melocactus intortus. However, he also used the word to describe the hair flower buds of cacti such as Echinopsis, which currently are not considered cephalium-bearing. According to Karl Moritz Schumann, the genera Melocactus and Cephalocereus—the latter of which by today's standards does not bear a true cephalium— are the only genera that have cephalia. Facheiroa and Micranthocereus have also been classified as cephalium-bearing cacti. Alwin Berger, Nathaniel Lord Britton and Joseph Nelson Rose consider Discocactus and Melocactus to be the only true cephalium-bearing cacti. Few even consider the areoles of Neoraimondia and Leptocereus as cephalia.

== Pseudocephalium ==
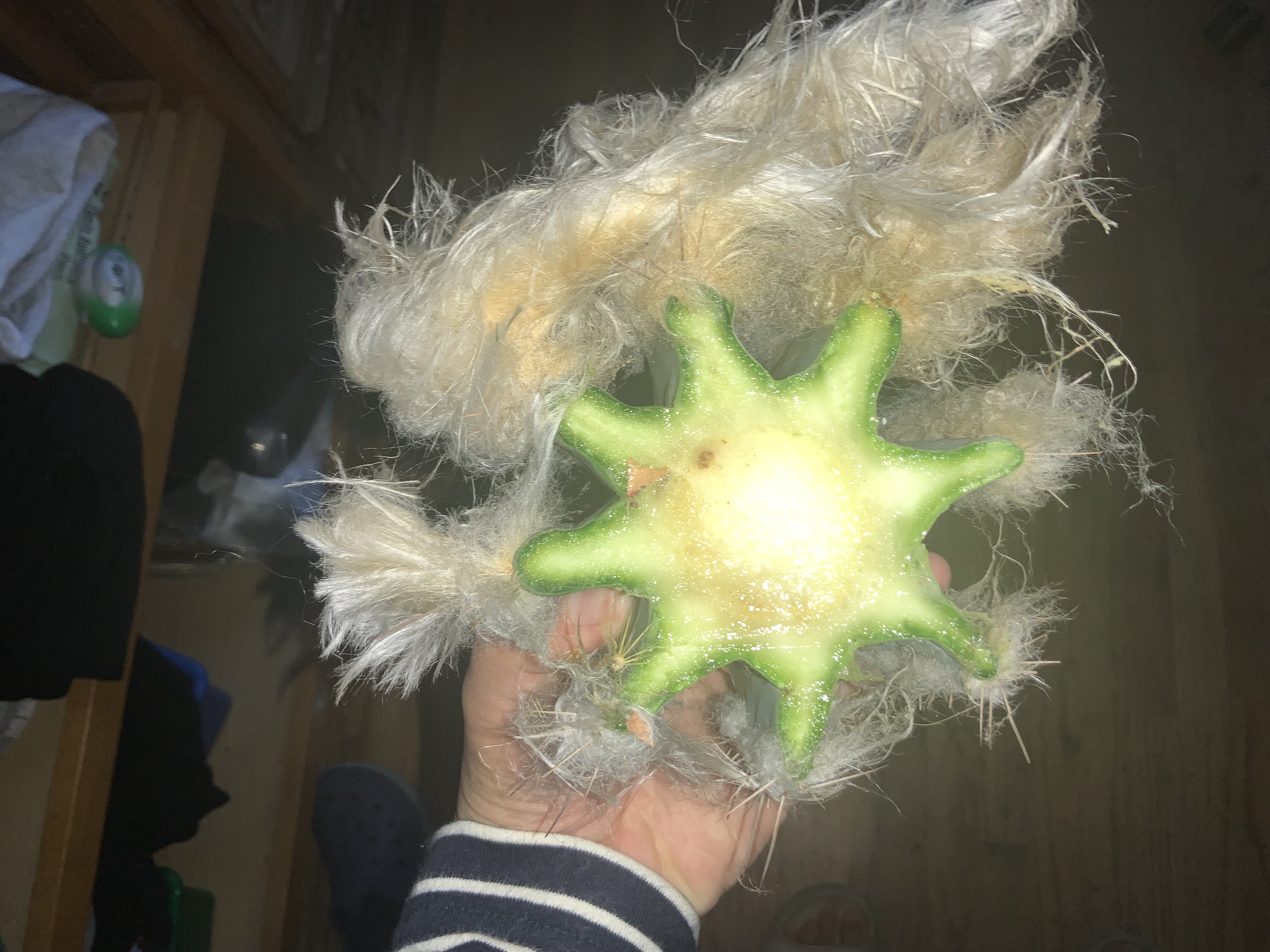
Cross section of a Pilosocereus leucocephalus stem showing pseudocephalium

Cacti that don't fit the definition of a true cephalium, but have hairs or bristles that emerge laterally are considered to have a pseudocephalium. Espostoa, Pilosocereus, and Facheiroa are good examples of cacti with pseudocephalia.

== Species ==
=== True cephalium: ===
Arrojadoa

Discocactus

Melocactus

Mitrocereus

=== Pseudocephalium: ===
Browningia (by some)

Castellanosia

Cleistocactus

Cephalocereus

Cereus (only Cereus mortensenii)

Cipocereus

Coleocephalocereus

Espostoa

Espostoopsis

Facheiroa

Lophocereus

Micranthocereus

Pilosocereus

Vatricania

Weberbauerocereus

Xiquexique

== Gallery ==
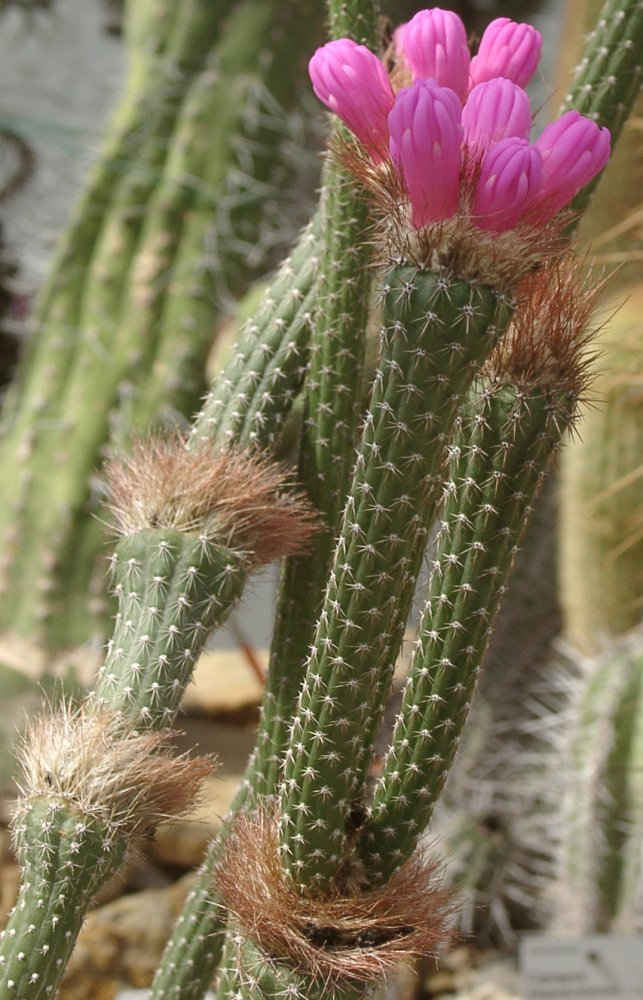
Flowers emerge from cephalium of Arrojadoa penicillata.

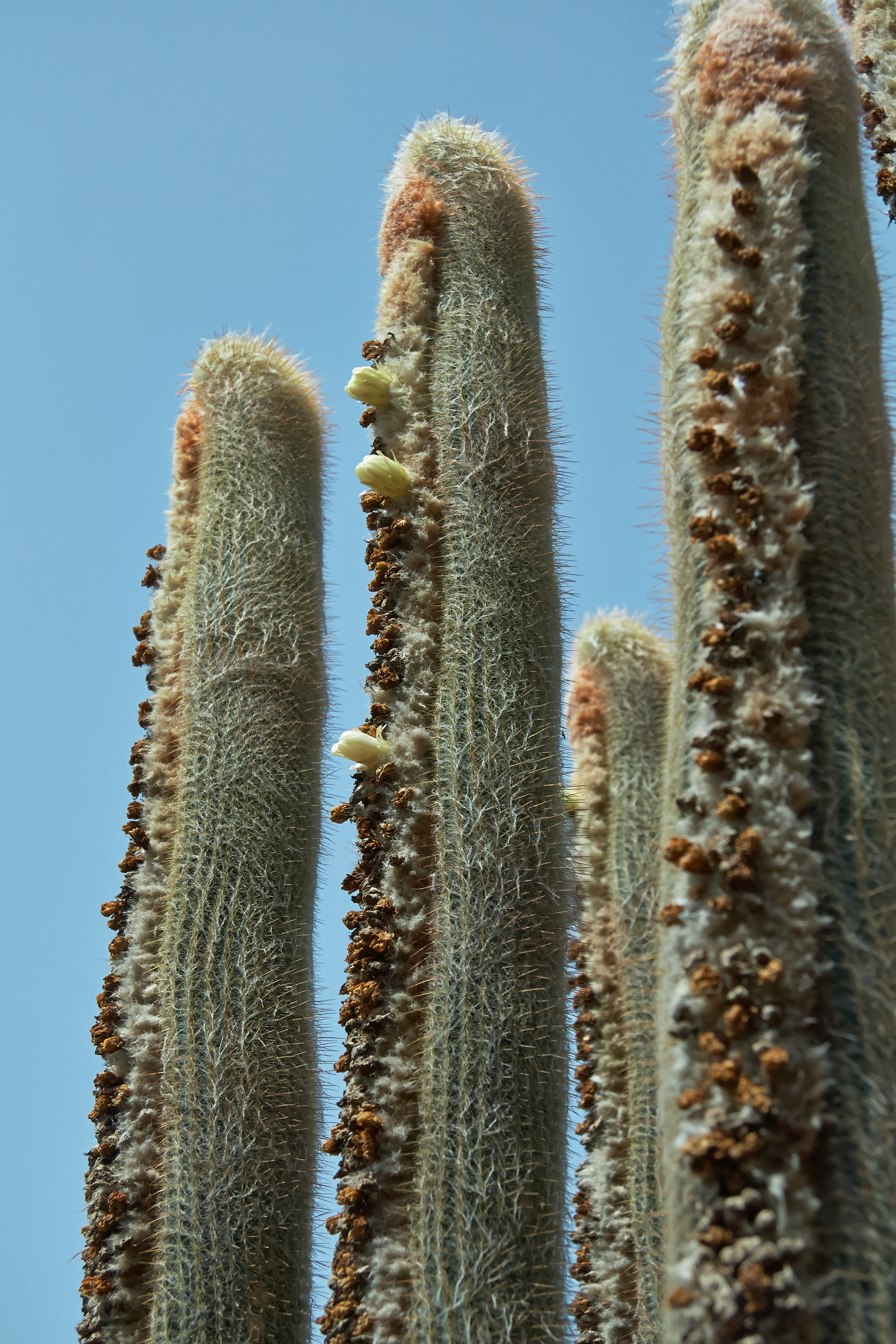
Lateral cephalium of Espostoa lanata
