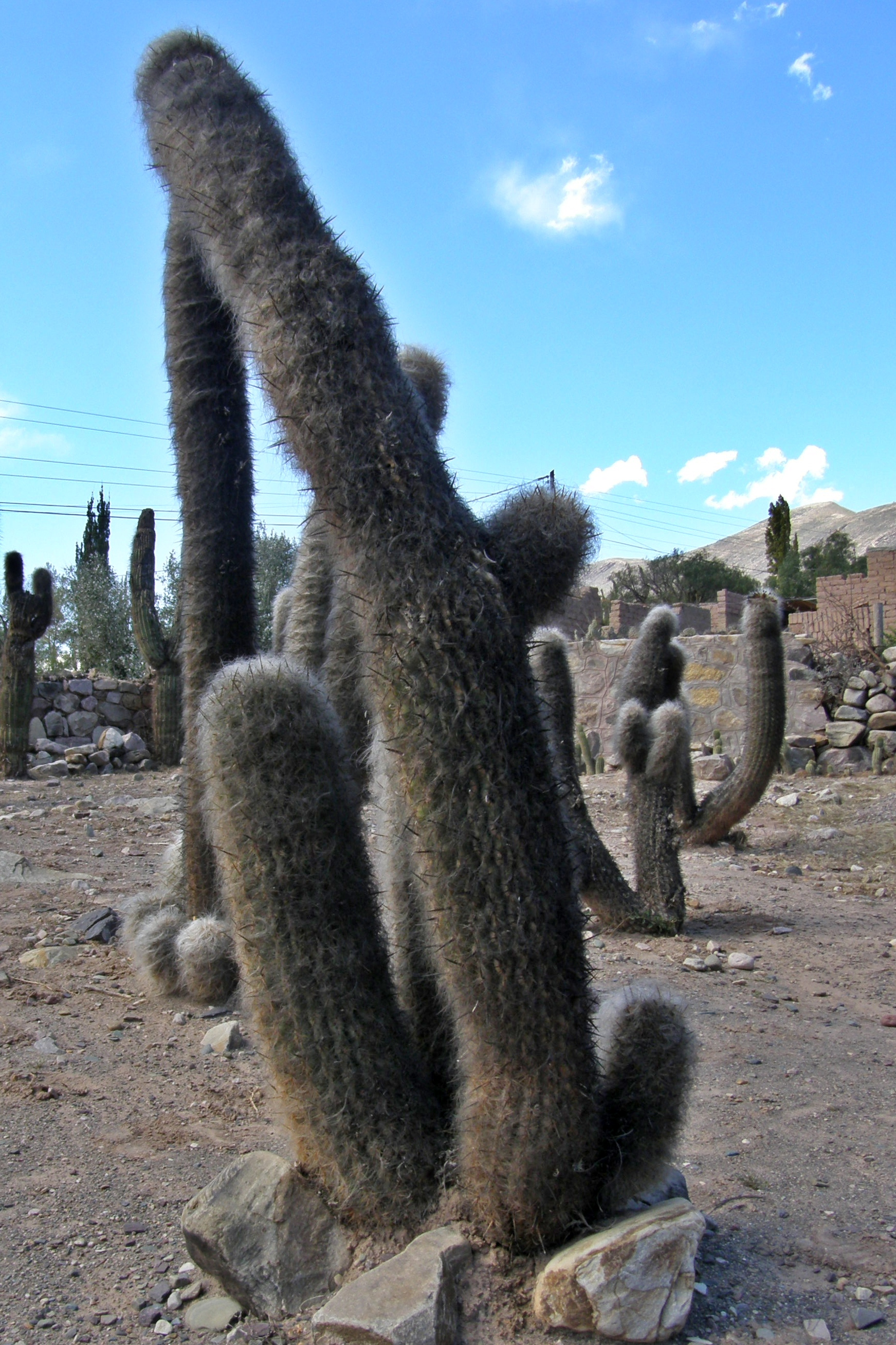
- Oreocereus celsianus

Scientific classification
- Kingdom: Plantae
- Clade: Tracheophytes
- Clade: Angiosperms
- Clade: Eudicots
- Order: Caryophyllales
- Family: Cactaceae
- Subfamily: Cactoideae
- Tribe: Cereeae
- Subtribe: Trichocereinae
- Genus: Oreocereus (A.Berger) Riccob.

Type species
- Oreocereus celsianus

Species
- See text.

Synonyms
- Arequipa Britton & Rose; Arequipiopsis Kreuz. & Buining; Moraquipa Rüd.Baumgärtner; Morawetzia Backeb.

= Oreocereus =

Genus of cacti

Oreocereus is a genus of cacti (family Cactaceae), known only from high altitudes of the Andes. Its name means "mountain cereus", formed from the Greek prefix oreo- (ὀρεο-, mountain) and the Neo-Latin cereus, meaning wax or torch.

== Description ==
The species of the genus Oreocereus grow shrubby, branching only sparsely from the base and reach heights of growth of 2 to 3 meters. Trunks are rarely formed. The erect, pendulous or rarely extended cylindrical shoots are notched or warty between the ribs. The areoles often have long white hairs and dense spines. As they are covered with woolly white fuzz (modified spines), a few species in this genus are sometimes known as the old-man cactus, a generic name that also refers to Cephalocereus senilis or Espostoa lanata. More rarely, the old man of the mountain is also used for some species. (Note: “[...] hairy cacti in cultivation include: golden old man (C. chrysacanthus), old woman (Mammillaria hahniana), Chilean old lady (Neoporteria senilis), and old man of the mountain (Borzicactus trollii).” [emphasis added, B. trollii being an old name for O. trollii].)

The tubular to funnel-shaped, more or less radially symmetrical, orange to red to violet flowers arise near the shoot tip, or sometimes from the terminal cephalium, and open during the day. The flower-tube is straight to slightly curved and sometimes laterally compressed. The numerous areoles on the pericarpel and the flower tube are hairy. The spherical to oblong fruits contain broadly oval, dull or shiny black seeds.

== Species ==
As of October 2025, Plants of the World Online accepts the following species:

Image	Scientific name	Distribution
	Oreocereus celsianus (Lem. ex Salm-Dyck) A.Berger ex Riccob.	Peru, Bolivia, Argentina (Jujuy)
	Oreocereus doelzianus (Backeb.) Borg	Peru.
	Oreocereus hempelianus (Gürke) D.R.Hunt	Peru to Chile (Tarapacá)
	Oreocereus leucotrichus (Phil.) Wagenkn.	Chile, Peru
	Oreocereus pseudofossulatus D.R.Hunt	Bolivia.
	Oreocereus ritteri Cullmann	Peru
	Oreocereus tacnaensis F.Ritter	Peru
	Oreocereus trollii (Kupper) Backeb.	Argentina, Bolivia
