= Pilosocereus catalani =

Scientific classification
- Kingdom: Plantae
- Clade: Embryophytes
- Clade: Tracheophytes
- Clade: Angiosperms
- Clade: Eudicots
- Order: Caryophyllales
- Family: Cactaceae
- Subfamily: Cactoideae
- Genus: Pilosocereus
- Species: P. catalani

Binomial name
- Pilosocereus catalani (Riccob.) Byles & G.D.Rowley

Synonyms
- Pilocerus catalani Riccob.

Species of flowering plant

Pilosocereus catalani is a species of cactus native to an unknown location.

== Description ==
Pilosocereus catalani is columnar, subarticulated, and has obtuse ribs. The short spines are conical with a tuberous base. Each areole has 6–8 marginal spines that are 5 mm long. The whitish-grey flowers form near the apex. Ovaries are glabrous, elongated, and cylindrical. flowers are unpleasant-smelling, bell-shaped and 10 centimeters longs. The diameter of a fully open bloom is 4–5 cm; the tube is short, slightly furrowed, glabrous, and dark green. On the tube, there are small, sparsely spaced triangular scales at the base. Fruits are red fleshed and 3–4 centimeters long. The publication further mentions that the plant matches up perfectly with a picture of Lophocereus schottii apart from the absence of bistles when mature, possibly indicating that is this plant should not part of the genus Pilosocereus.

== Etymology ==
The specific epithet "catalani" refers to Italian botanist Giuseppe Catalano.
