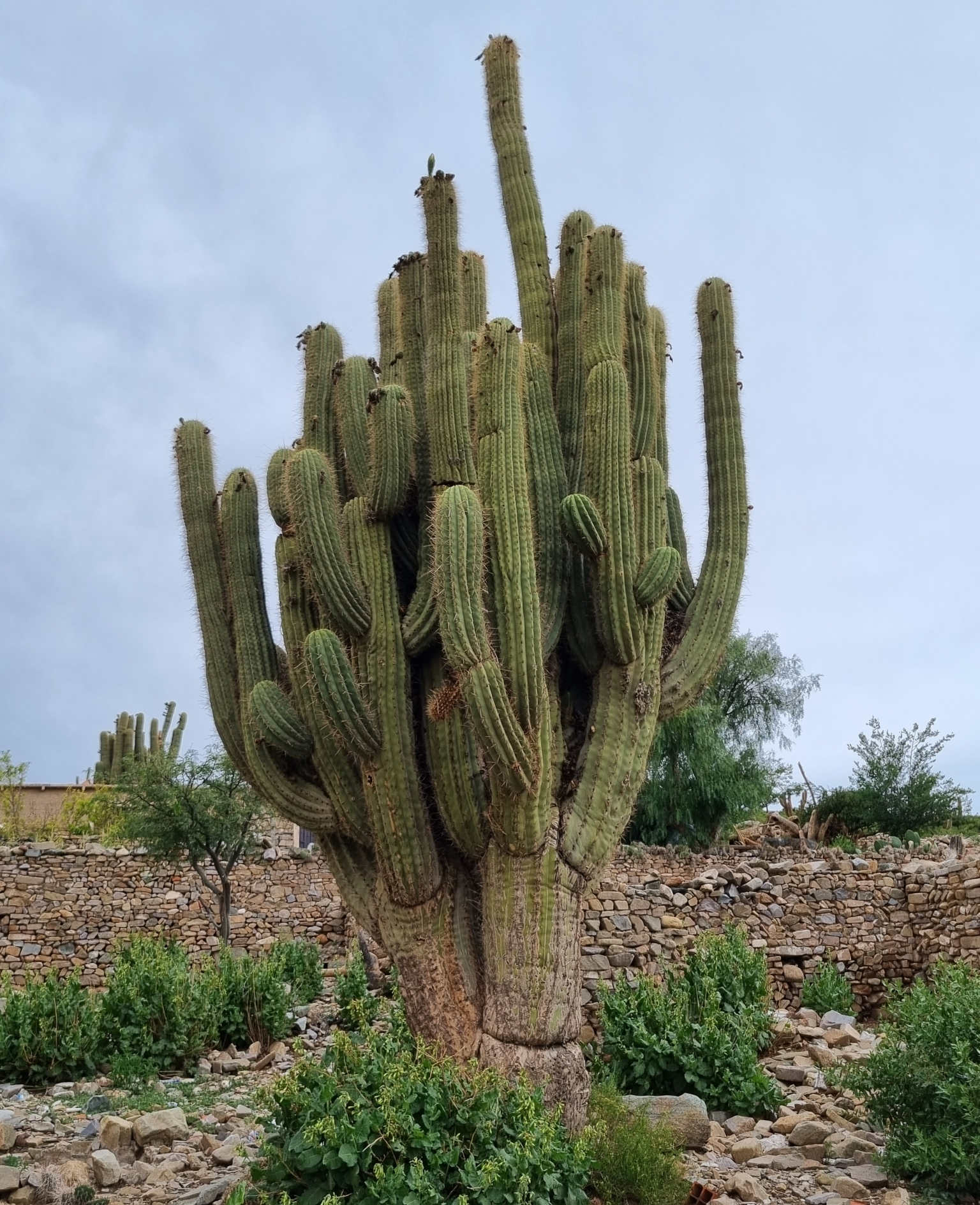

Conservation status
- Least Concern (IUCN 3.1)

Scientific classification
- Kingdom: Plantae
- Clade: Embryophytes
- Clade: Tracheophytes
- Clade: Spermatophytes
- Clade: Angiosperms
- Clade: Eudicots
- Order: Caryophyllales
- Family: Cactaceae
- Subfamily: Cactoideae
- Genus: Leucostele
- Species: L. werdermanniana

Binomial name
- Leucostele werdermanniana (Backeb.) Schlumpb.

Synonyms
- Echinopsis werdermanniana (Backeb.) H.Friedrich & G.D.Rowley 1974; Trichocereus werdermannianus Backeb. 1935; Echinopsis escayachensis (Cárdenas) H.Friedrich & G.D.Rowley 1974; Helianthocereus escayachensis (Cárdenas) Backeb. 1966; Trichocereus escayachensis Cárdenas 1963

= Leucostele werdermanniana =

Species of cactus

Leucostele werdermanniana is a species of cactus found in Bolivia.

== Description ==
Leucostele werdermanniana is a tree-like cactus reaching about 5 meters tall, with a 1-meter-long trunk and a diameter of 40–60 cm. It has multiple branches, usually over five, measuring 16–26 cm in diameter, with a greenish-yellow epidermis. The stems have 10–16 obtuse ribs at the apex, about 3 cm wide and 2 cm high. At the stem base, there are 13–14 ribs, 3 cm wide and 2.5 cm high. Areoles on these ribs are circular, roughly 1 mm high and 5 mm in diameter, covered with gray hairs, each bearing around 14 needle-like spines (1.5–2.5 cm long), which may be straight or curved, yellow or yellow with brown tips. There is no clear distinction between central and radial spines. Areoles are dark gray to black, spaced about 2.5 cm apart, with spines up to 6 cm long—usually a black central spine up to 7 cm and about six black radial spines (1.3–5 cm). Some areoles lack a central spine or are spineless. Flowers, mainly apical but sometimes subapical, are about 20 cm long. The ovary and floral tube are covered with dense gray and brown hairs, with white tepals.Fruits are hairy about 3.5 cm in diameter, containing rough seeds approximately 1.3 cm long. Leucostele werdermanniana resembles L. terscheckii, but can be distinguished by its yellow-green epidermis (vs. dark green in L. terscheckii) and the position of its flowers—mainly apical versus subapical in L. terscheckii.

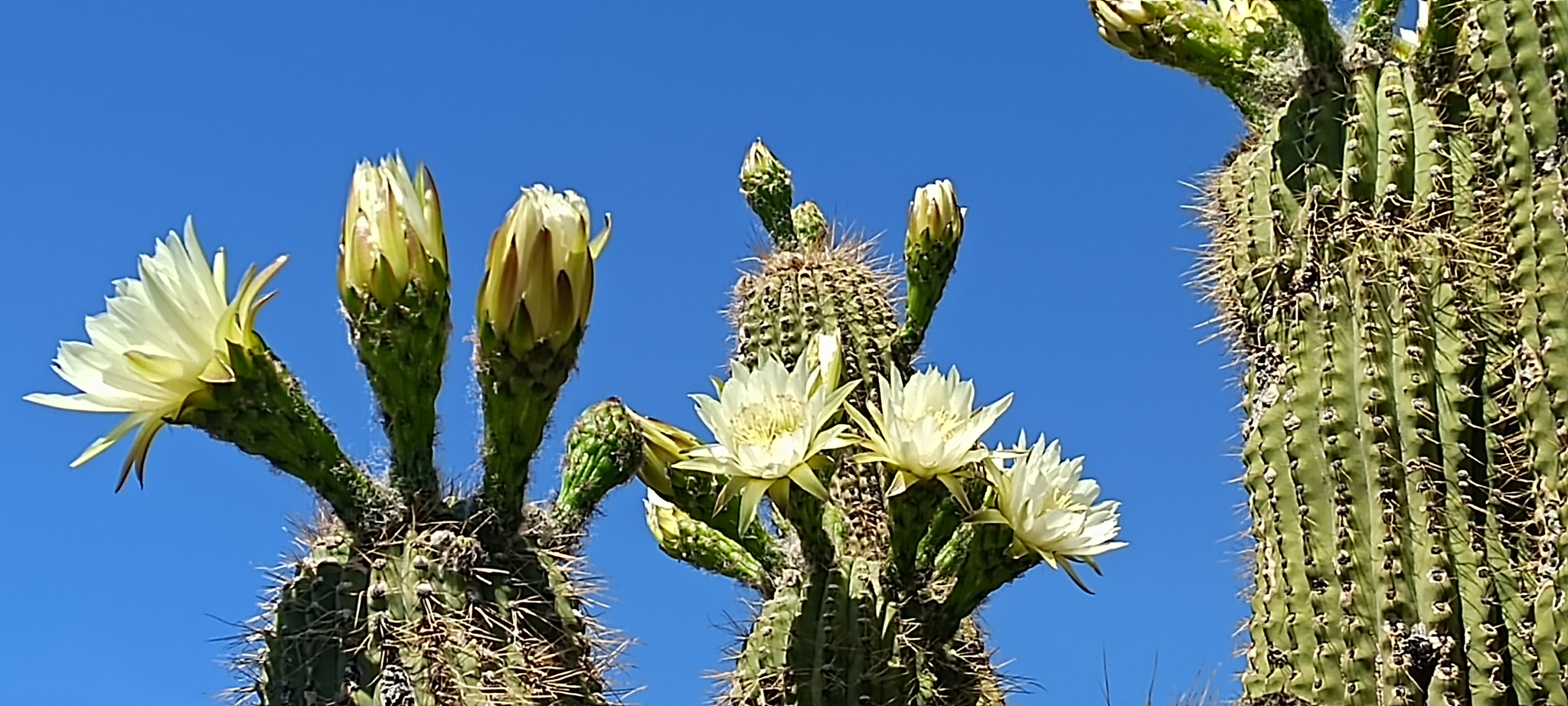
Flowers

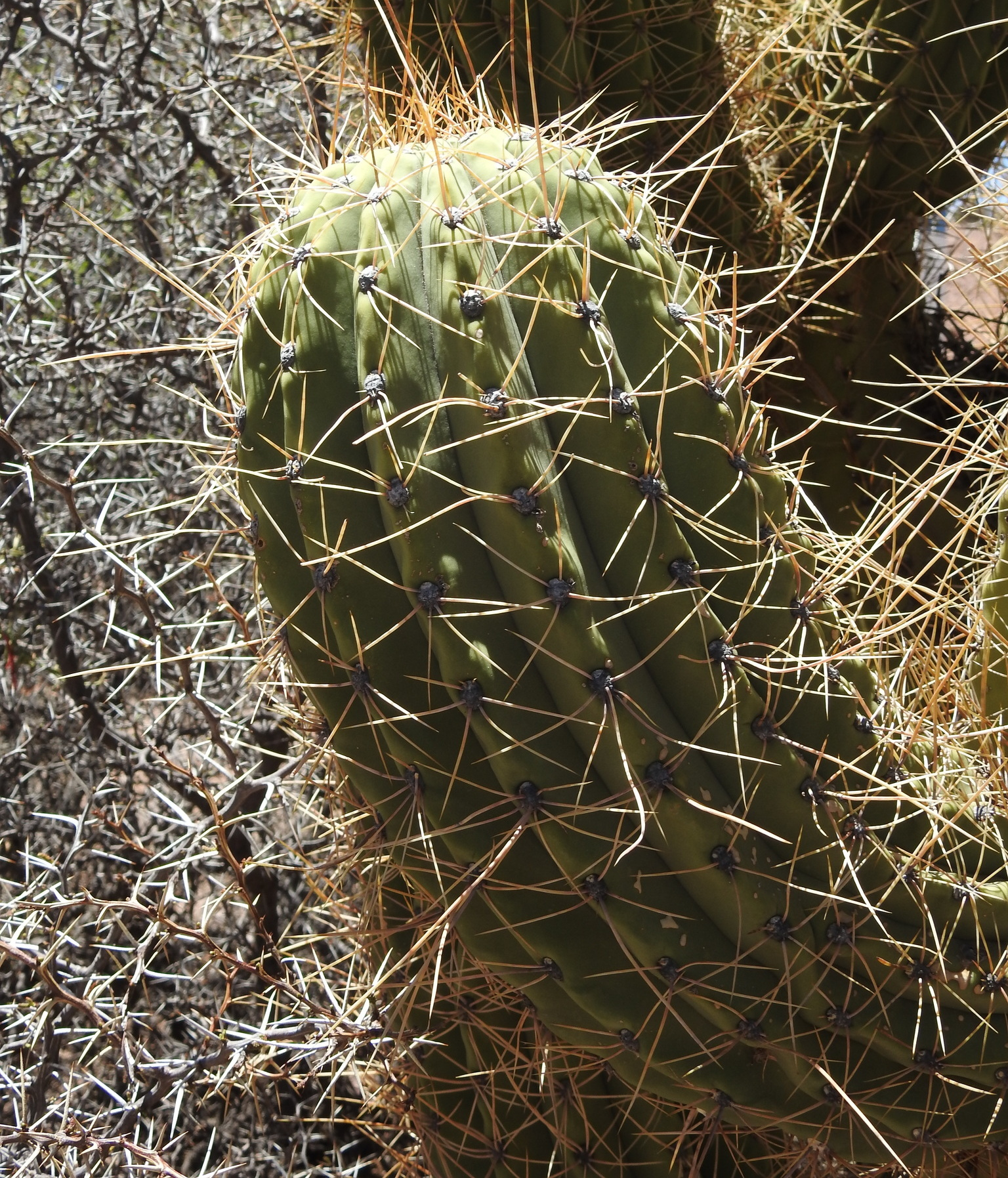
Spines and areoles

== Distribution ==
Plants are found growing in desert scrub the Potosí and Tarija Department, in the Charcoma Valley, east of Tupiza in Bolivia at elevations of 2600 to 3700 meters. Plants growing in the habitat include Oreocereus celsianus.

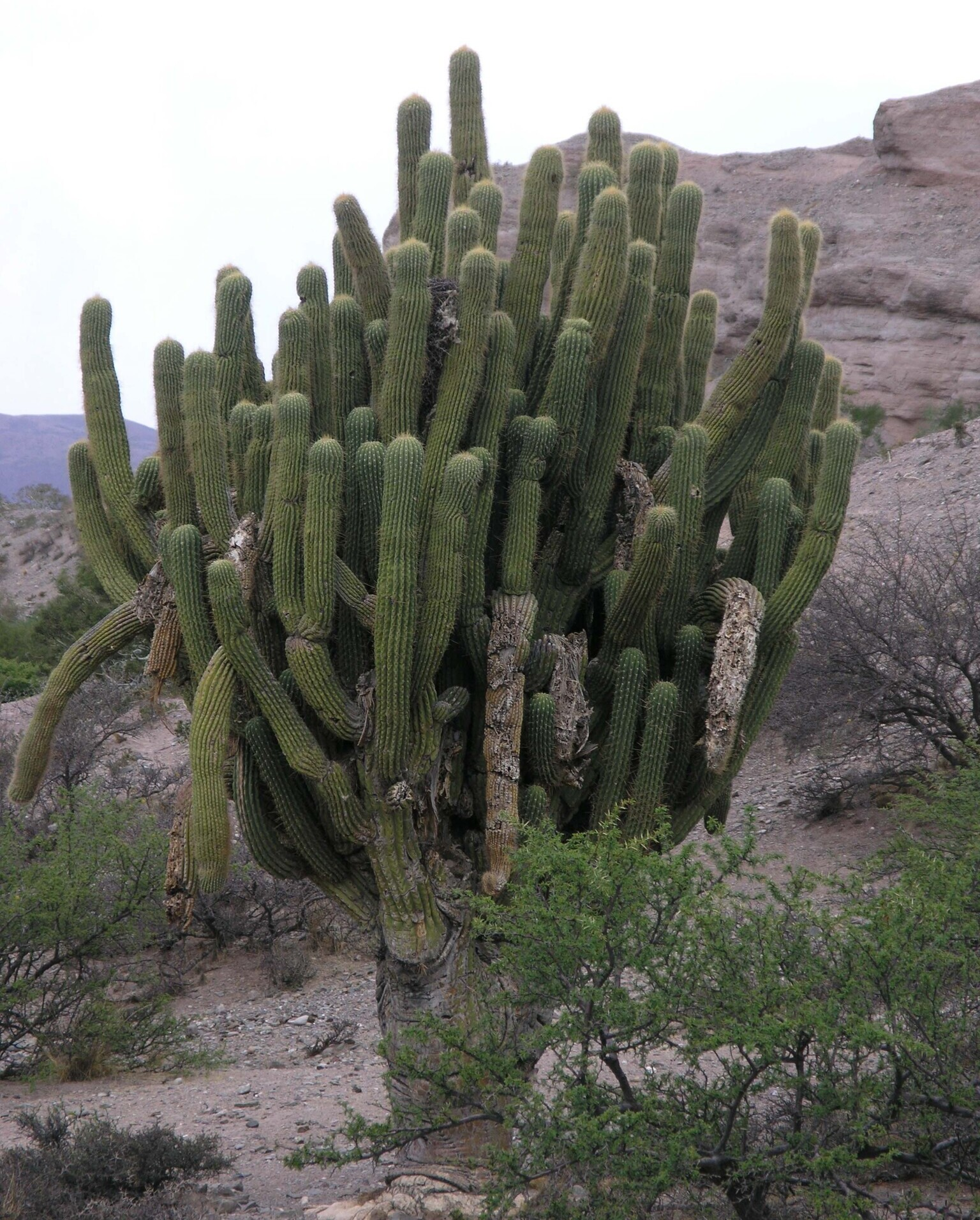
Plant growing in Pescuma, Bolivia

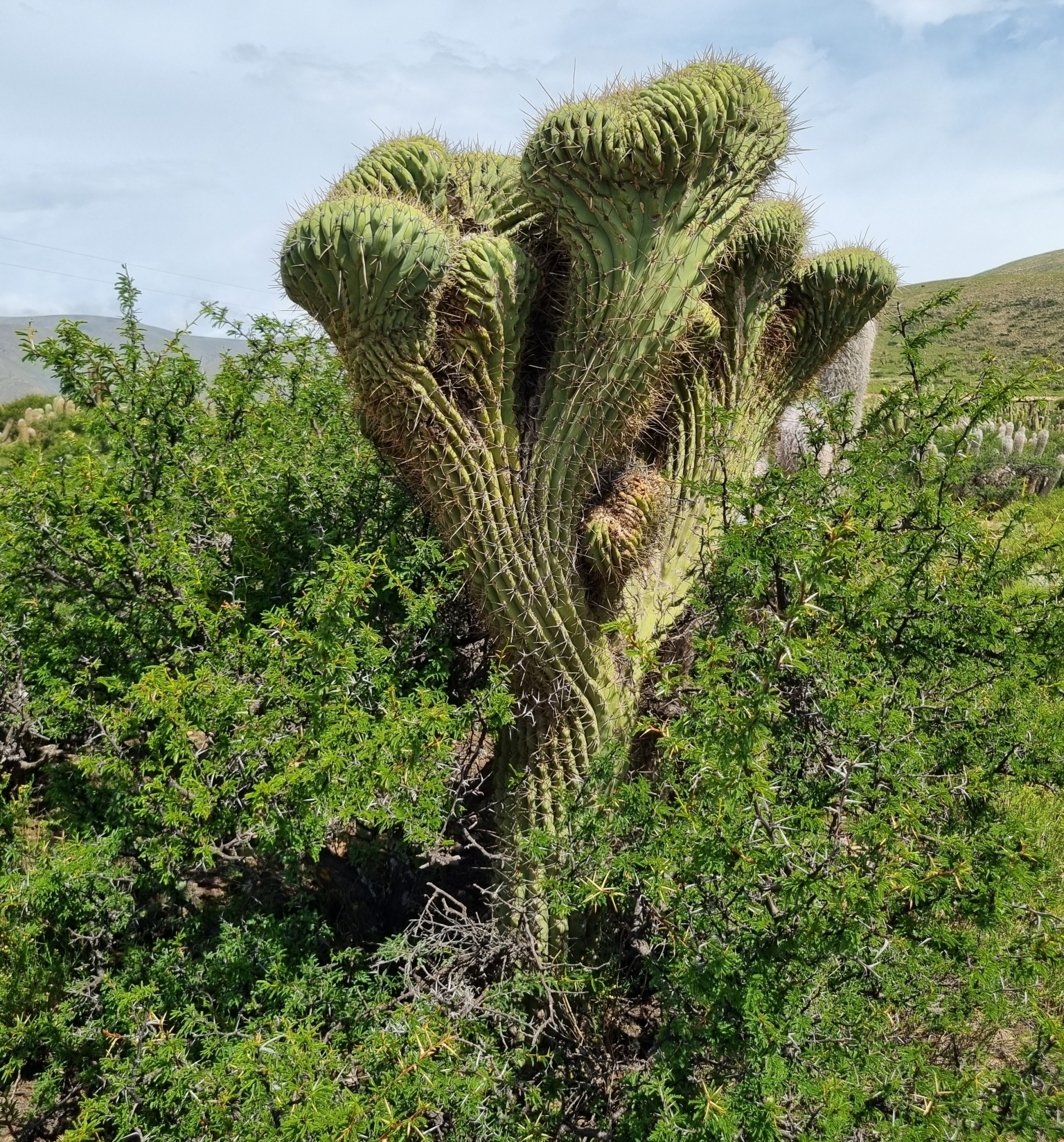
Crested plant growing in Finca Iscayache, Bolivia

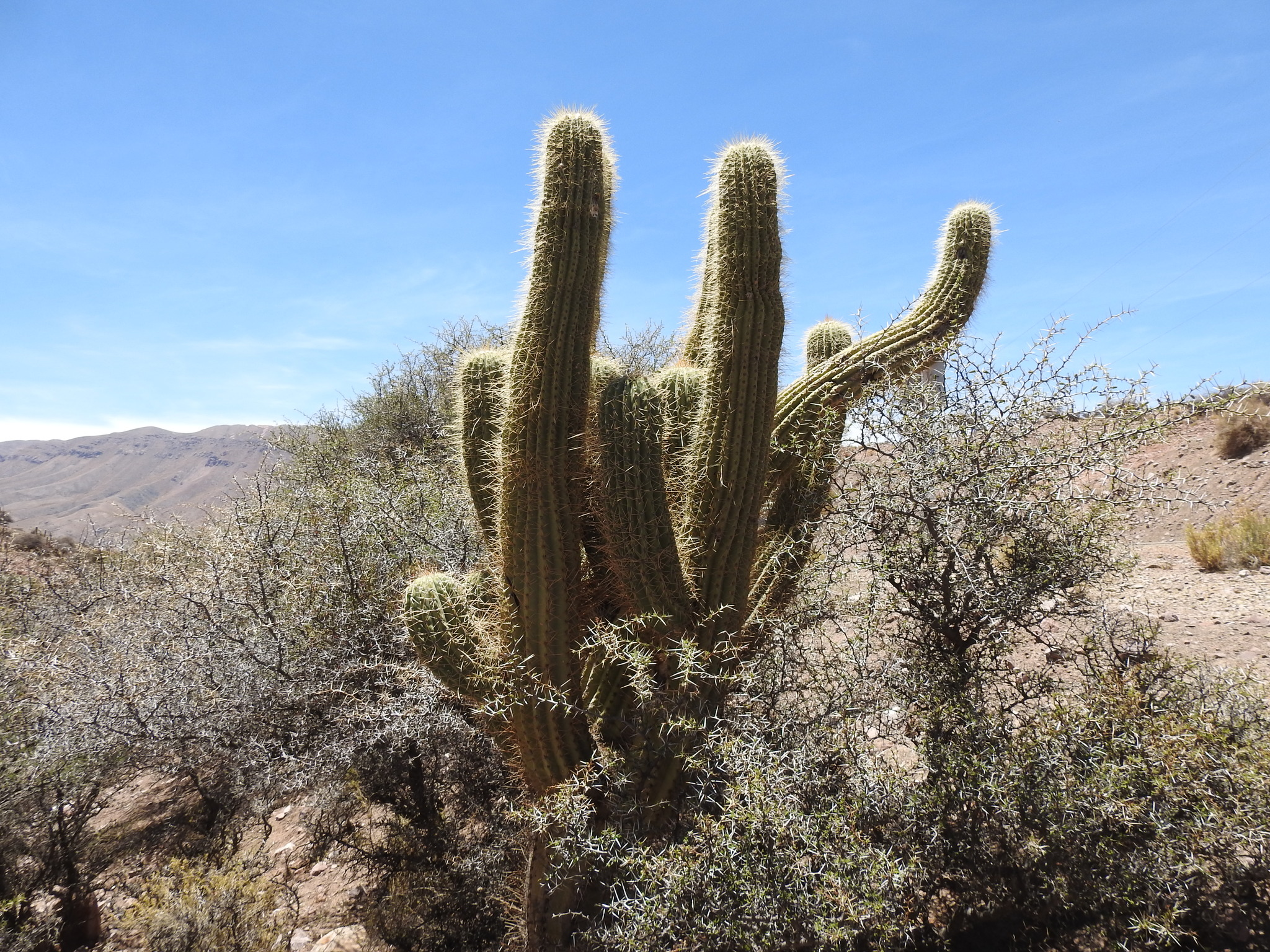
Habitat in Yura, Bolivia

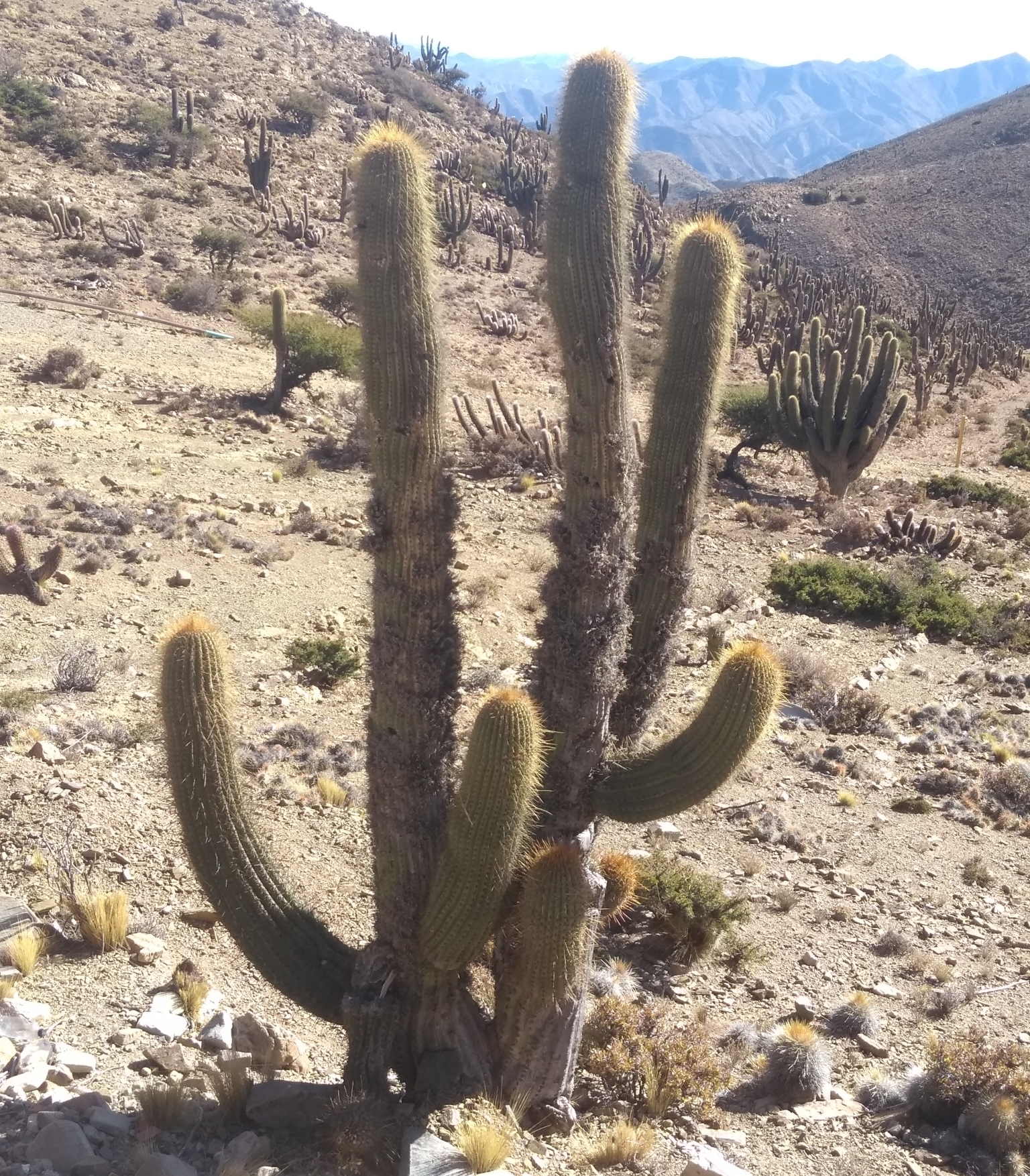
Habitat in Cieneguillas, Bolivia

== Taxonomy ==
This species was first described by Curt Backeberg in 1935 as Trichocereus werdermannianus naming the species in honor of german botanist Erich Werdermann. In 2012, Boris Oliver Schlumpberger transferred the species to the genus Leucostele.
