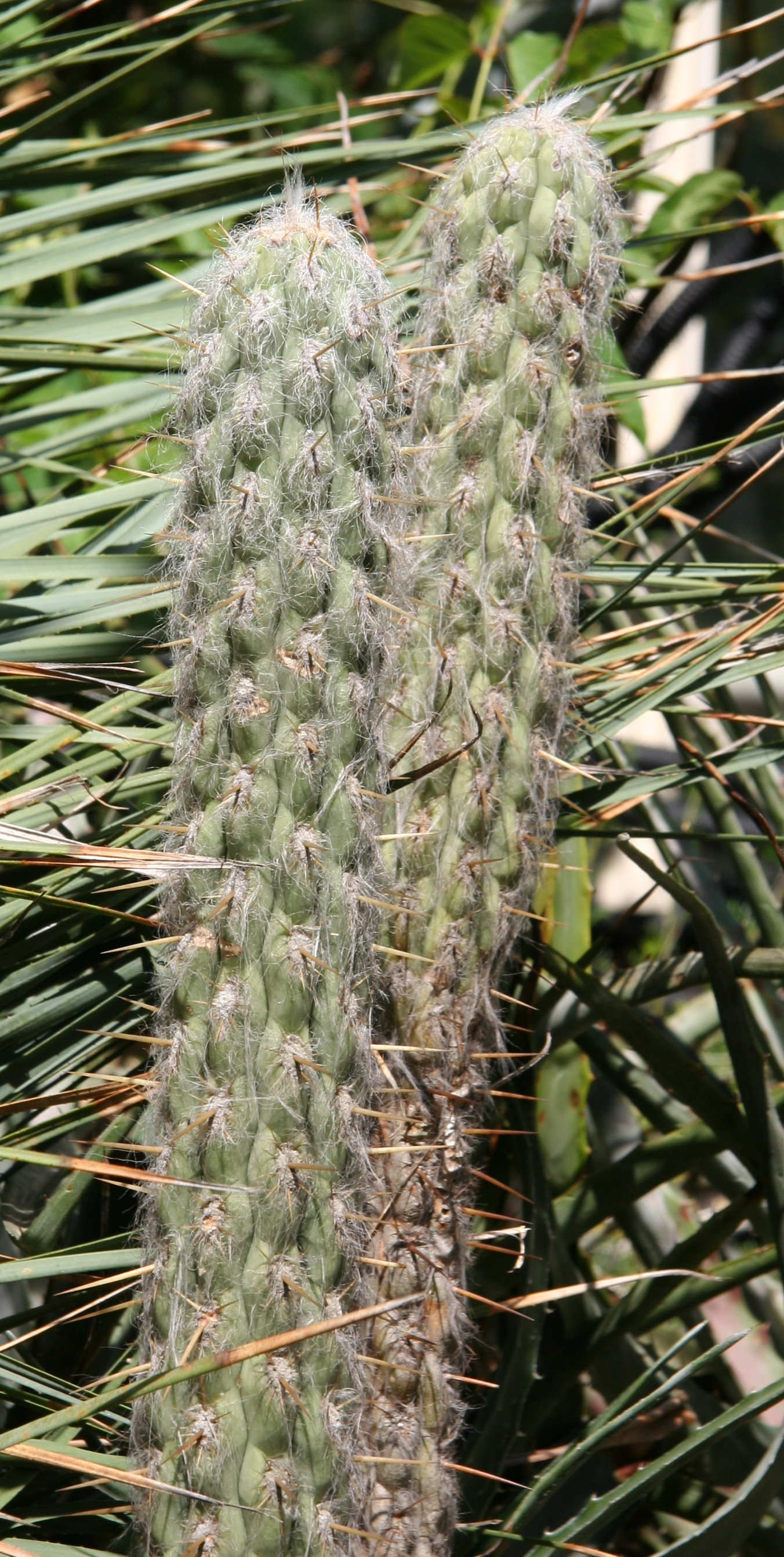

Scientific classification
- Kingdom: Plantae
- Clade: Tracheophytes
- Clade: Angiosperms
- Clade: Eudicots
- Order: Caryophyllales
- Family: Cactaceae
- Subfamily: Cactoideae
- Genus: Oreocereus
- Species: O. ritteri

Binomial name
- Oreocereus ritteri Cullmann 1958

= Oreocereus ritteri =

Species of cactus

Oreocereus ritteri is a species of Oreocereus found in Peru.

== Description ==
Oreocereus ritteri grows shrubby, is usually branched at the base and forms groups of 2 to 4 meters in diameter and heights of 1 to 1.5 meters. The cylindrical, gray-green shoots are 1 to 2 meters long and have a diameter of 7 to 10 cm (2.8 to 3.9 in). There are 12 to 14 ribs that are deeply notched between the areoles. The spiny areoles are densely covered with numerous white hairs. The one or two protruding, bright yellow to orange-yellow central spines are straight to slightly curved downwards and 2 to 10 cm (0.79 to 3.94 in) long. The up to ten radiating radial spines are whitish, have a darker tip and are up to 2 cm (0.79 in) long.

The crooked red flowers are up to 11 cm (4.3 in) long and have a diameter of 5 cm (2.0 in). The spherical fruits are yellowish green and reach a diameter of 3 to 5 cm (1.2 to 2.0 in).

== Distribution ==
Oreocereus ritteri is widespread in the Ayacucho region of Peru.

== Taxonomy ==
The first description was made in 1958 by Willy Cullmann. The specific epithet ritteri honors the German cactus specialist Friedrich Ritter.
