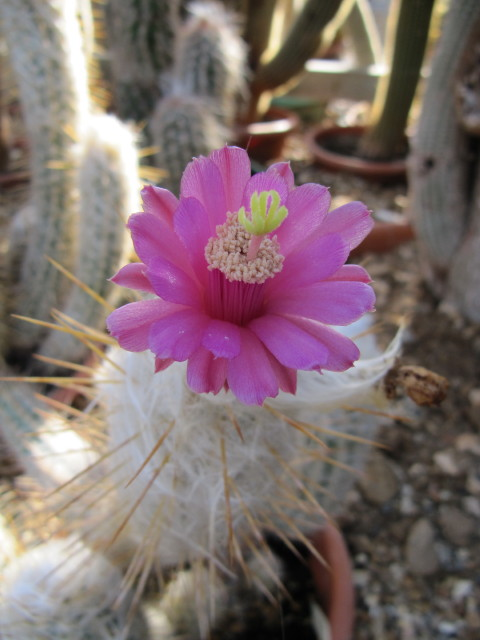

Conservation status
- Least Concern (IUCN 2.3)

Scientific classification
- Kingdom: Plantae
- Clade: Tracheophytes
- Clade: Angiosperms
- Clade: Eudicots
- Order: Caryophyllales
- Family: Cactaceae
- Subfamily: Cactoideae
- Genus: Oreocereus
- Species: O. leucotrichus

Binomial name
- Oreocereus leucotrichus (Phil.) Wagenkn.

Synonyms
- List: Arequipa leucotricha (Phil.) Britton & Rose 1922; Arequipa variicolor (Backeb.) Backeb. 1953; Borzicactus hendriksenianus (Backeb.) Kimnach 1960; Borzicactus leucotrichus (Phil.) Kimnach 1960; Cereus hendriksenianus Backeb. 1933; Echinocactus leucotrichus Phil. 1891; Echinopsis leucotricha (Phil.) Anceschi & Magli 2013; Morawetzia variicolor Kníže 1969; Oreocereus hendriksenianus (Backeb.) Backeb. 1933; Oreocereus hendriksenianus f. densilanatus (Rauh & Backeb.) Krainz 1963; Oreocereus hendriksenianus var. densilanatus Rauh & Backeb. 1956 publ. 1957; Oreocereus hendriksenianus f. spinosissimus (Rauh & Backeb.) Krainz 1963; Oreocereus hendriksenianus var. spinosissimus Rauh & Backeb. 1956 publ. 1957; Oreocereus knizei T.Hewitt & Donald 1975; Oreocereus variicolor Backeb. 1951; Oreocereus variicolor var. tacnaensis Backeb. 1962

= Oreocereus leucotrichus =

Species of cactus

Oreocereus leucotrichus is a species of cactus native to Peru and Chile.

== Description ==
Oreocereus leucotrichus grows as a shrub with numerous, upwardly curved shoots branching from the base and forming dense groups. The columnar shoots are 1 to 2 meters long and have a diameter of 6 to 12 cm (2.4 to 4.7 in). There are 10 to 15 flat and shallowly grooved ribs. The areoles on them are covered with numerous, white to black, 5 to 10 cm (2.0 to 3.9 in) long hairs. The spines arising from the areoles are strong, yellowish to chestnut brown or orange and do not turn gray with age. The one to four central spines are slightly curved and 5 to 8 cm (2.0 to 3.1 in) long. The five to ten radial spines are up to 1.5 cm (0.59 in) long.

The crimson flowers appear near the tips of the shoots. They are 8 to 10 cm (3.1 to 3.9 in) long. The spherical to slightly elongated fruits are reddish yellow to yellowish green and have a diameter of 4 to 6 cm (1.6 to 2.4 in).

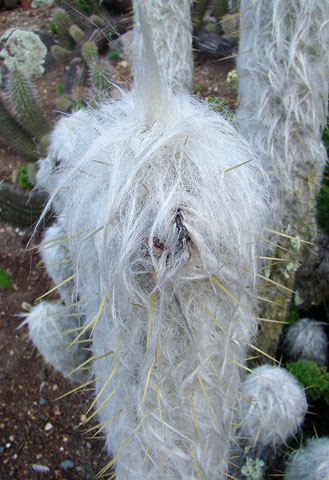

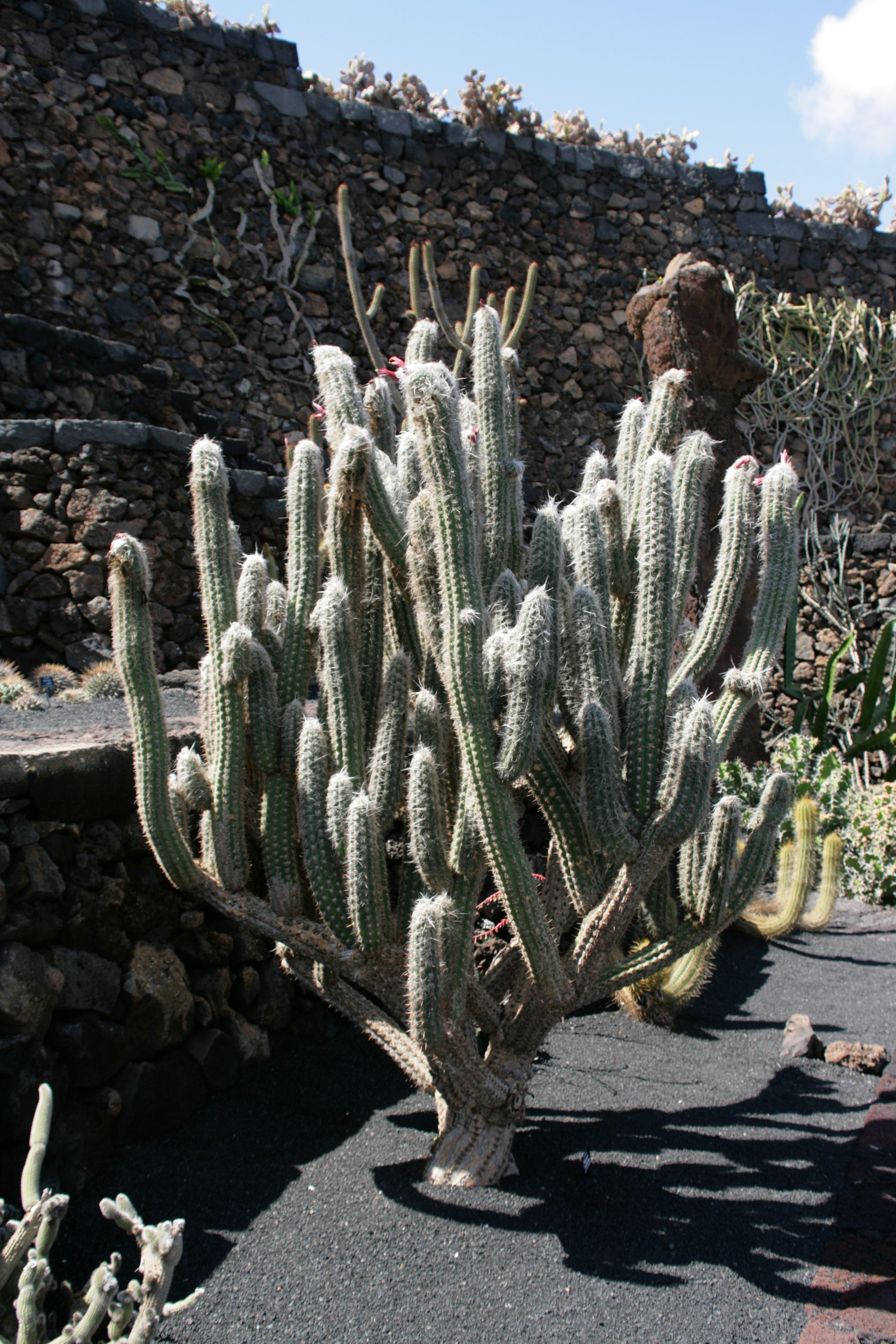

== Distribution ==
Oreocereus leucotrichus is widespread in the Peruvian regions of Ayacucho and Arequipa as well as in northern Chile at altitudes of 2000 to 3500 meters.

== Taxonomy ==
The first description as Echinocactus leucotrichus was made in 1891 by Rudolph Amandus Philippi. The specific epithet leucotrichus comes from Greek, means 'white-haired' and refers to the white hairs that cover the species. Rodolfo Wagenknecht placed them in the genus Oreocereus in 1956. Nomenclatural synonyms are Arequipa leucotricha (Phil.) Britton & Rose (1922), Borzicactus leucotrichus (Phil.) Kimnach (1960) and Echinopsis leucotricha (Phil.) Anceschi & Magli (2013).
