= Oreocereus tacnaensis =

Scientific classification
- Kingdom: Plantae
- Clade: Tracheophytes
- Clade: Angiosperms
- Clade: Eudicots
- Order: Caryophyllales
- Family: Cactaceae
- Subfamily: Cactoideae
- Genus: Oreocereus
- Species: O. tacnaensis

Binomial name
- Oreocereus tacnaensis F.Ritter

Species of plant

Oreocereus tacnaensis is a species of Oreocereus found in Peru.

== Description ==
Oreocereus tacnaensis grows as a shrub with erect or spreading shoots that branch from the base. The blue- to gray-green shoots are up to 3 meters long and have a diameter of 4 to 8 cm (1.6 to 3.1 in). There are 10 to 16 notched ribs. The spines arising from the areoles are reddish brown to brownish yellow. The four to eight central spines are straight to slightly curved and 3 to 6 cm (1.2 to 2.4 in) long. The 12 to 30 needle-like radial spines are straight and up to 1 cm (0.39 in) long.

The crooked-edged flowers are brownish red to blood red and 8 to 11 cm (3.1 to 4.3 in) long. The spherical fruits are yellowish to brownish yellow and have a diameter of 3 to 4 cm (1.2 to 1.6 in). When fully ripe, they tear open from the tip and release the seeds.

== Distribution ==
Oreocereus tacnaensis is widespread in the Tacna region of Peru at altitudes of around 3000 meters.

== Taxonomy ==
The first description was made in 1981 by Friedrich Ritter. The specific epithet tacnaensis refers to the occurrence of the species near the Peruvian city of Tacna.
