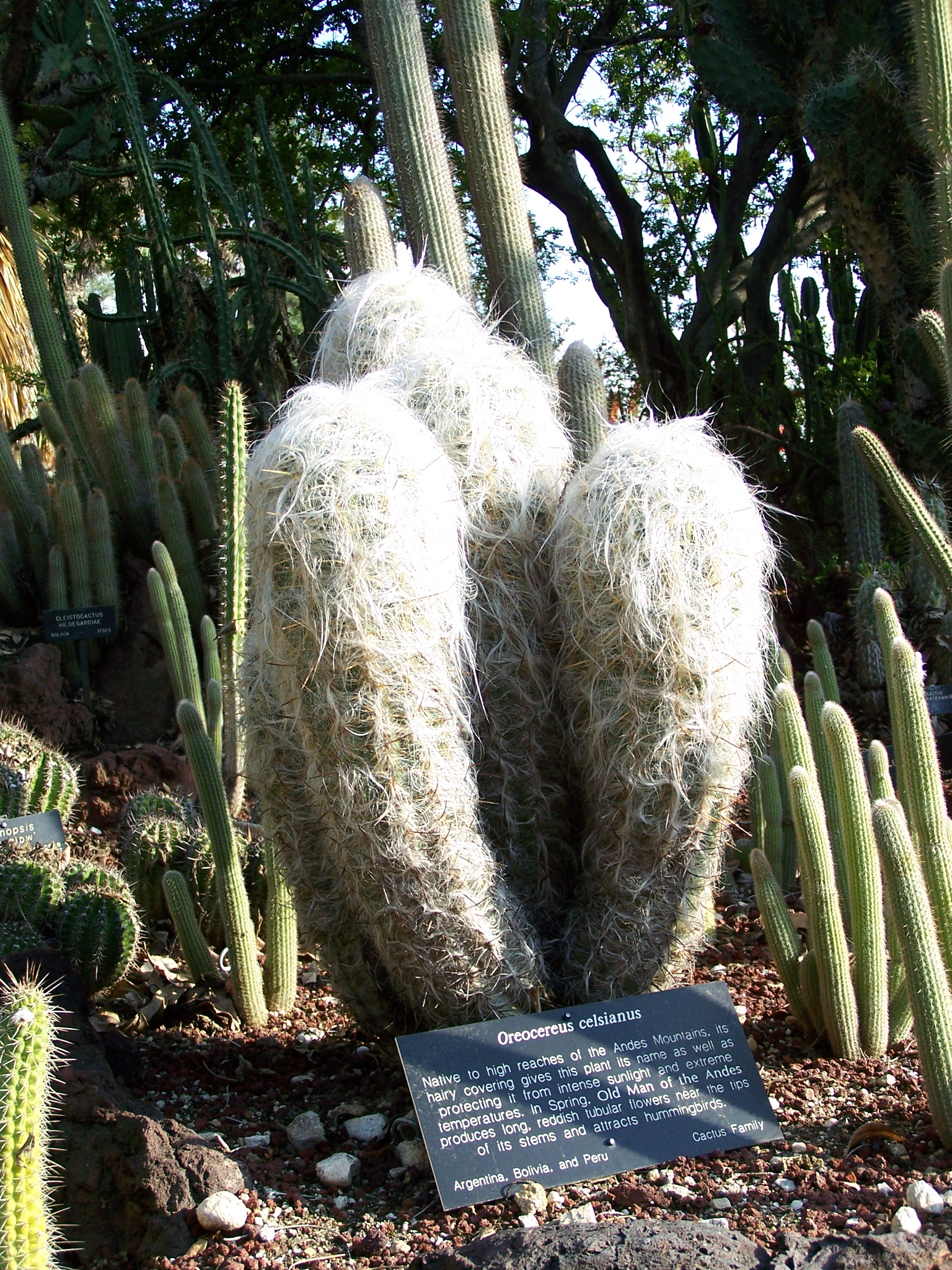

Conservation status
- Least Concern (IUCN 2.3)

Scientific classification
- Kingdom: Plantae
- Clade: Tracheophytes
- Clade: Angiosperms
- Clade: Eudicots
- Order: Caryophyllales
- Family: Cactaceae
- Subfamily: Cactoideae
- Genus: Oreocereus
- Species: O. celsianus

Binomial name
- Oreocereus celsianus (Salm-Dyck) A.Berger ex Riccob.

Synonyms
- List: Cereus celsianus (Lem. ex Salm-Dyck) A. Berger; Cleistocactus celesianus (Lem. ex Salm-Dyck) A. Weber; Cleistocactus tupizensis (Vaupel) Backeb. & F.M. Knuth; Oreocereus bruennowii (Haage ex Rumpler) Backeb.; Oreocereus celsianus var. bruennowii (Haage ex Rumpler) Borg; Oreocereus maximus Backeb.; Oreocereus neocelsianus Backeb.; Pilocereus bruennowii Haage ex Rumpler; Pilocereus celsianus Lem. ex Salm-Dyck

= Oreocereus celsianus =

Species of cactus

Oreocereus celsianus, or the old man of the mountain is a member of the family Cactaceae native to the high lands of the Andes in South America, and is named for its fluffy white hair, which may protect it from intense sunlight and extreme temperatures.

== Description ==
Oreocereus celsianus grows with upright, columnar shoots that branch out from the base and reaches heights of up to around 3 metres (10 ft) tall with a diameter of 8 to 12 cm (3.1 to 4.7 in). O. celsianus is covered in a downy white hair and spines, with greatest density at the tips of stems receding to near-bare at the base.

There are 10 to 25 vertical rounded and tuberous ribs, typically with eleven ribs (but Mauseth found as many as 29 ribs), has many long, brown spines. The large areoles on it are white, densely covered with spines and covered with hairs up to 5 cm (2.0 in) long. The strong, one to four central spines are up to 8 cm (3.1 in) long, the seven to nine radial spines are up to 2 cm (0.79 in) long.

The plants bloom in spring with long, tubular, bright, slightly purplish-pink flowers, appear near the tips of the shoots. They are 7 to 9 cm (2.8 to 3.5 in) long and have a diameter of up to 3 cm (1.2 in). The fruits are spherical. These fruit are hollow and filled with an unspecified biogenerated gas.

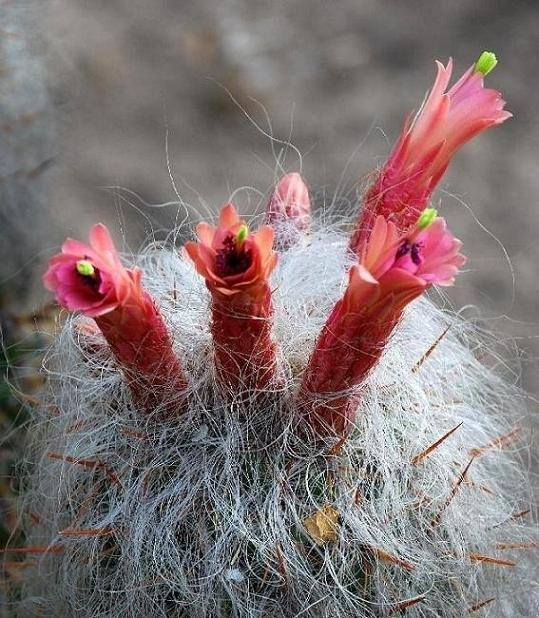
Flower

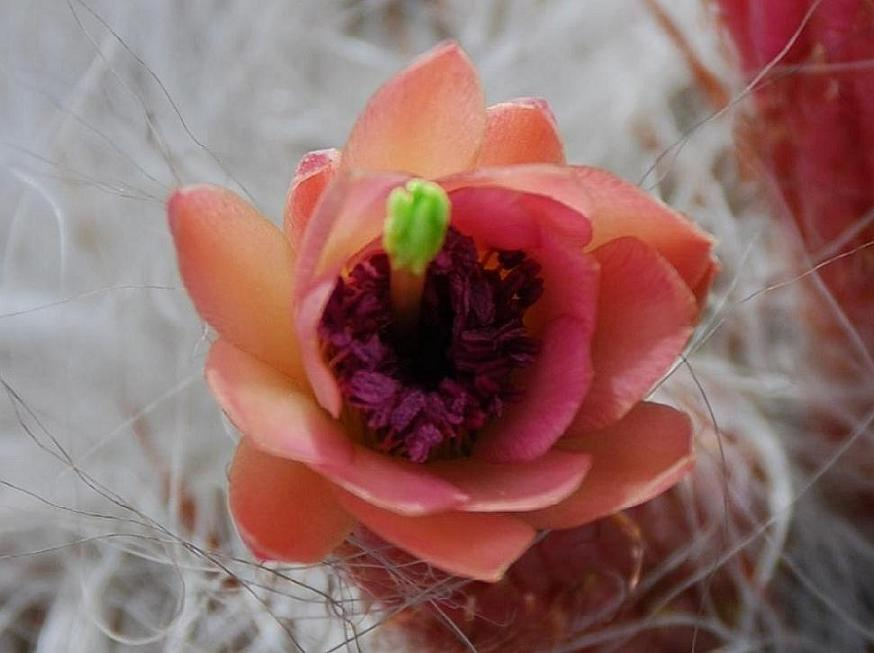
Flower closeup

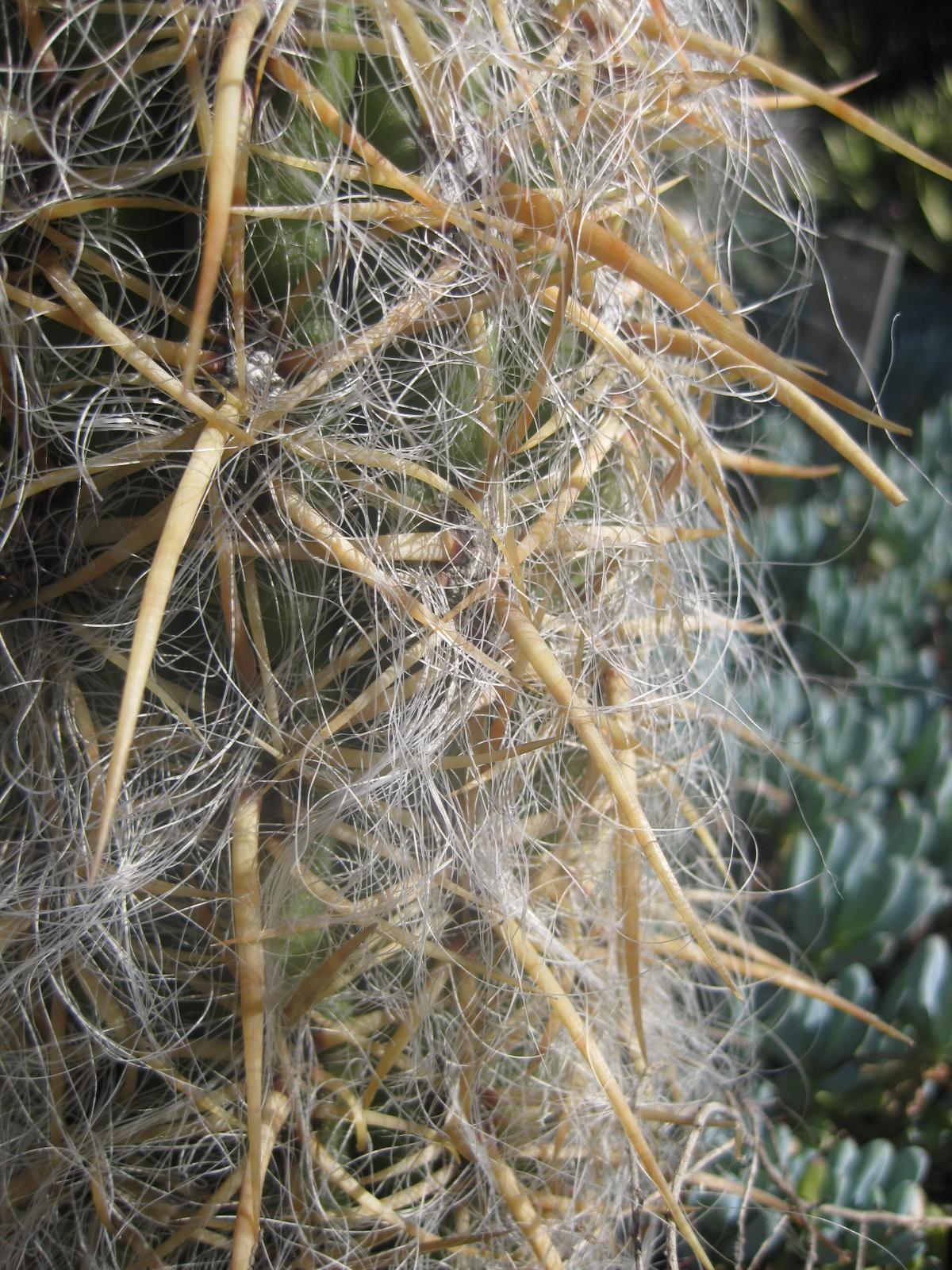
Spines closeup

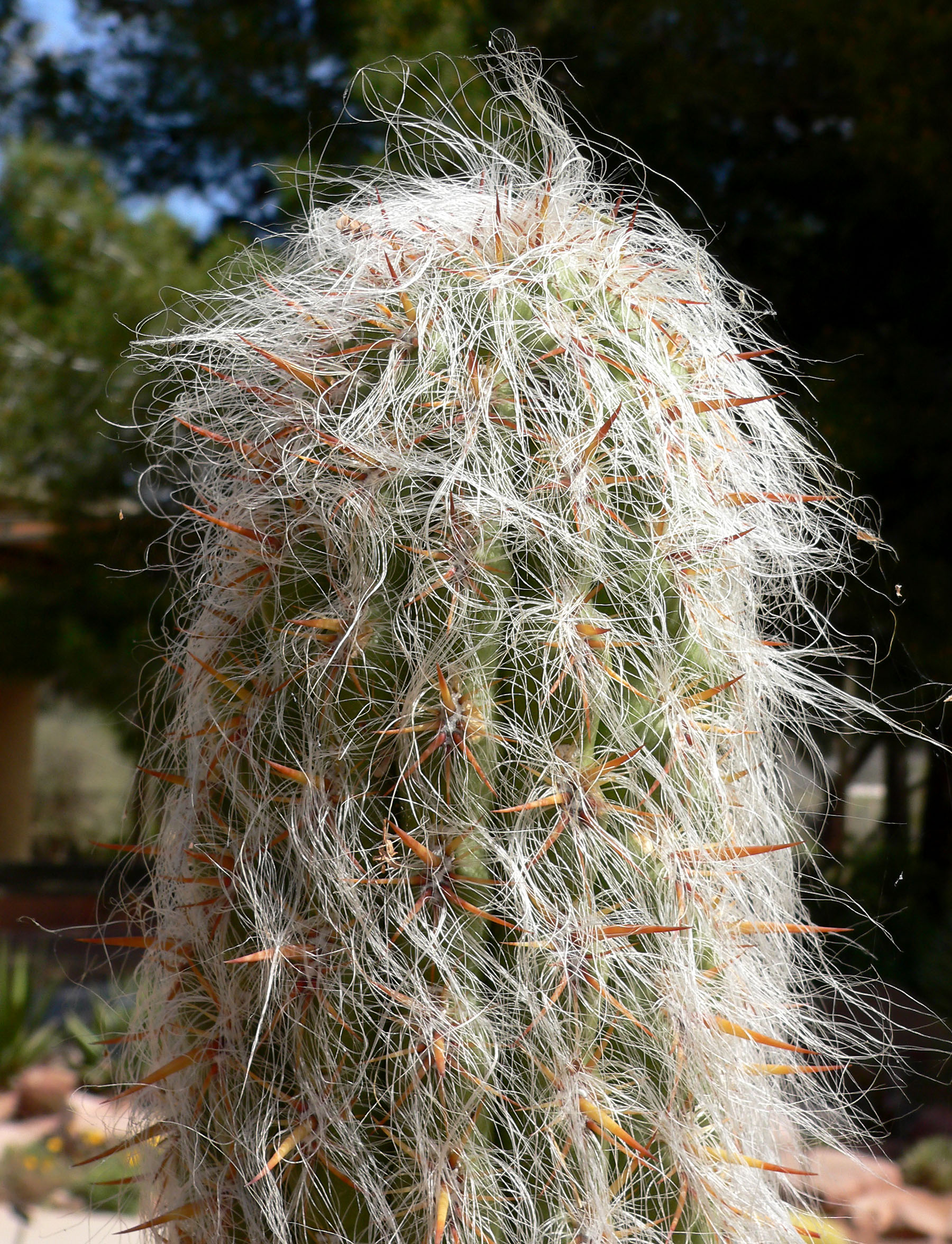
Tip of shoot

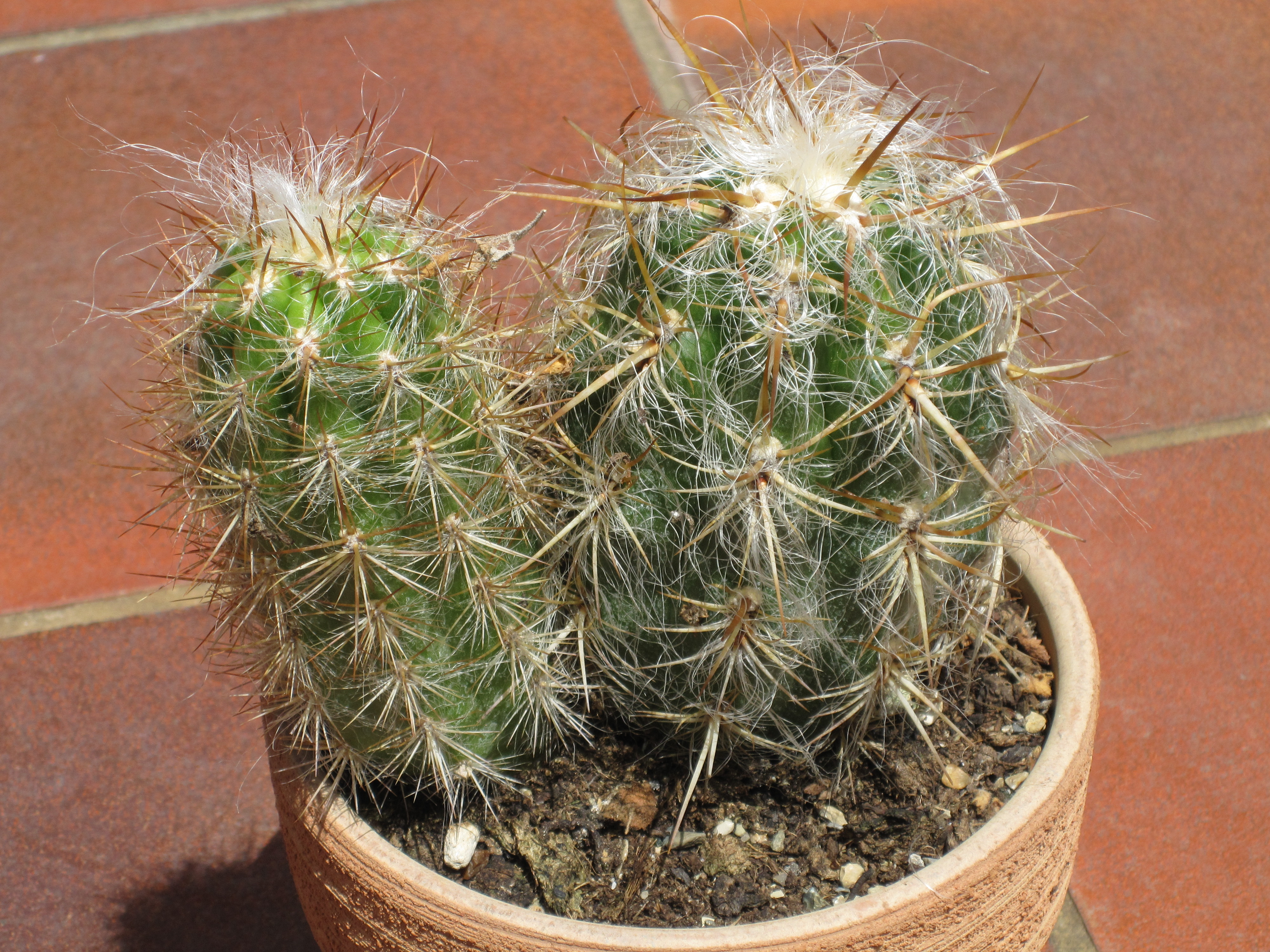
Oreorcereus celsianus in pot

== Taxonomy ==
The first description as Pilocereus celsianus was made in 1850 by Charles Lemaire in Joseph zu Salm-Reifferscheidt-Dyck's Cacteae in horto Dyckensi cultae anno 1849. The specific epithet celsianus honors the French gardener Jean-François Cels (1810-1888), who, together with his brother Auguste Cels (1809-1898), was known for growing cacti and orchids. Vincenzo Riccobono placed them in the genus Oreocereus in 1909.

== Distribution ==
Oreocereus celsianus occurs in the Bolivian departments of Chuquisaca, Potosí, and Tarija, Peru, and the Argentine province of Jujuy in the puna vegetation at altitudes of 2,900 to 3,600 meters.

== Ecology ==
The plant is pollinated by hummingbirds, mostly by a single species—the southern giant hummingbird Patagona gigas. It is also capable of selfing.

== Cultivation ==
The plant thrives at 10–12 °C (50–54 °F), with a frost-tolerance of down to −12.2 °C (10.0 °F) and requiring protection from hot sunlight. It prefers full sun and light watering. It propagates from seed or by stem cuttings.
