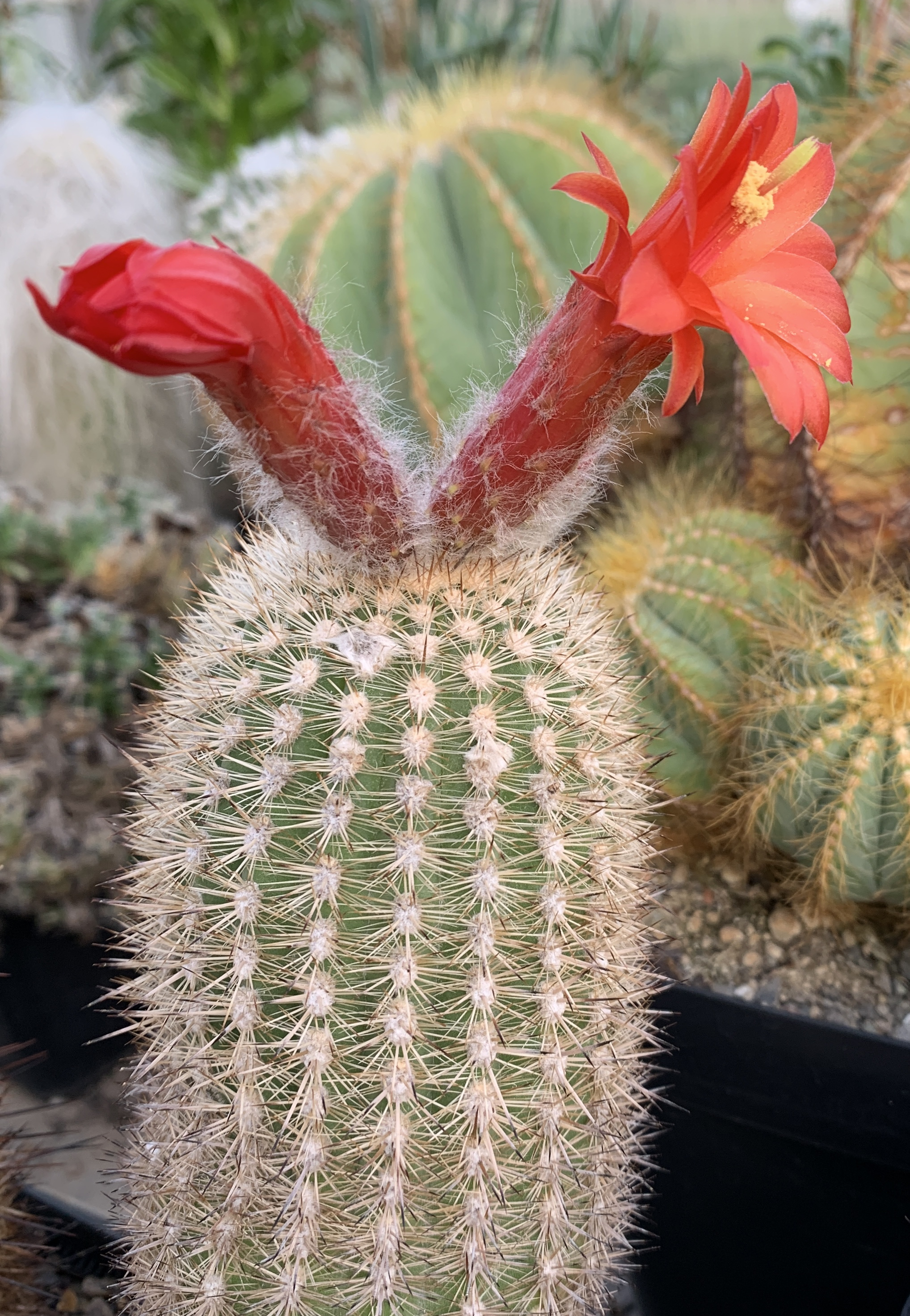

Conservation status
- Least Concern (IUCN 2.3)

Scientific classification
- Kingdom: Plantae
- Clade: Tracheophytes
- Clade: Angiosperms
- Clade: Eudicots
- Order: Caryophyllales
- Family: Cactaceae
- Subfamily: Cactoideae
- Genus: Oreocereus
- Species: O. hempelianus

Binomial name
- Oreocereus hempelianus (Gürke) D.R.Hunt

Synonyms
- List: Arequipa hempeliana]] (Gürke) Oehme 1940; Arequipiopsis hempeliana]] (Gürke) Kreuz. & Buining 1941; Borzicactus hempelianus]] (Gürke) Donald 1970; Echinopsis hempeliana]] Gürke 1906; Arequipa australis]] F.Ritter 1980; Arequipa erectocylindrica]] Rauh & Backeb. 1956 publ. 1957; Arequipa rettigii]] (Quehl) Oehme 1940; Arequipa rettigii var. borealis]] F.Ritter 1981; Arequipa rettigii var. erectocylindrica]] (Rauh & Backeb.) Krainz 1967; Arequipa soehrensii]] Backeb. 1959; Arequipa spinosissima]] F.Ritter 1964; Arequipa weingartiana]] Backeb. 1936; Arequipa weingartiana var. carminanthema]] Backeb. 1936; Arequipiopsis rettigii]] (Quehl) Kreuz. & Buining 1941; Arequipiopsis soehrensii]] Kreuz. in Repert. 1941; Arequipiopsis weingartiana]] (Backeb.) Kreuz. & Buining 1941; Borzicactus hempelianus var. rettigii]] (Quehl) Donald 1970; Borzicactus hempelianus var. spinosissimus]] (F.Ritter) Donald 1970; Borzicactus hempelianus var. weingartianus]] (Backeb.) Donald 1970; Echinocactus rettigii]] Quehl 1919; Oreocereus australis]] (F.Ritter) A.E.Hoffm. 1989; Oreocereus rettigii]] (Quehl) Buxb. 1973

= Oreocereus hempelianus =

Species of cactus

Oreocereus hempelianus is a species of cactus native to Peru and Chile.

== Description ==
Oreocereus hempelianus grows with spherical to elongated gray-green shoots that branch from the base and reaches heights of 30 to 40 cm (12 to 16 in). There are 12 to 24 wide and flat ribs. The initially yellow to reddish spines later become cloudy gray. The one to six central spines are flexible and 2 to 5 cm (0.79 to 1.97 in) long. The 10 to 15 radial spines are flexible, spreading and 1 to 3 cm (0.39 to 1.18 in) long.

The crooked-edged red flowers appear at the tips of the shoots. They are 6 to 7 cm (2.4 to 2.8 in) long. The barrel-shaped fruits reach a length of 1.5 to 2.5 cm (0.59 to 0.98 in).

== Distribution ==
Oreocereus hempelianus is common in the Arequipa region of Peru and Tarapacá, Chile, at altitudes of 2,500 to 3,500 meters.

== Taxonomy ==
The first description as Echinopsis hempeliana was made in 1906 by Max Gürke. The specific epithet hempelianus honors the German cactus lover and businessman Georg Hempel.[1] Foreign language common names are "Achacaño" and "Arequipa". David Richard Hunt placed them in the genus Oreocereus in 1987. Nomenclature synonyms are Arequipa hempeliana (Gürke) Oehme (1940), Arequipiopsis hempeliana (Gürke) cross. & Buining (1941) and Borzicactus hempelianus (Gürke) Donald (1970).
