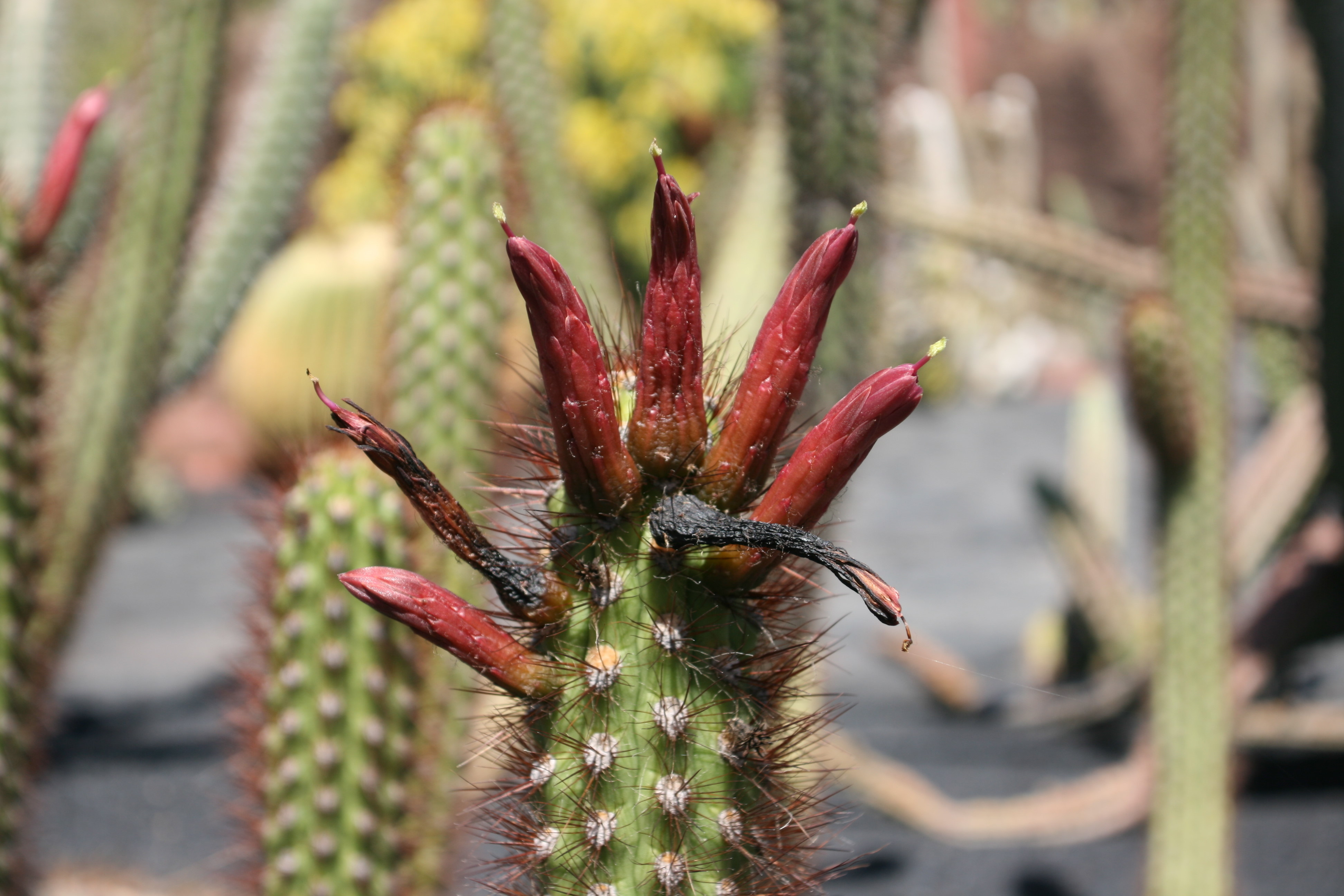

Conservation status
- Near Threatened (IUCN 3.1)

Scientific classification
- Kingdom: Plantae
- Clade: Tracheophytes
- Clade: Angiosperms
- Clade: Eudicots
- Order: Caryophyllales
- Family: Cactaceae
- Subfamily: Cactoideae
- Genus: Oreocereus
- Species: O. pseudofossulatus

Binomial name
- Oreocereus pseudofossulatus D.R.Hunt

Synonyms
- Cleistocactus fossulatus Mottram; Oreocereus fossulatus var. rubrispinus F.Ritter

= Oreocereus pseudofossulatus =

Species of cactus

Oreocereus pseudofossulatus is a species of Oreocereus found in Bolivia.

== Description ==
Oreocereus pseudofossulatus grows shrubby, branches irregularly in the lower half and reaches heights of up to 2 meters. The light green shoots have a diameter of 5 to 8 cm (2.0 to 3.1 in). There are 10 to 13 straight and tuberous ribs. The spines are straw yellow or rarely reddish. The single, conspicuous central spine, 2 to 5 cm (0.79 to 1.97 in) long, is initially protruding and later directed slightly downwards. The 10 to 14 radial spines are up to 6 mm (0.24 in) long.

The tubular, crooked-edged, greenish pink to bluish red flowers appear near the tips of the shoots and are up to 9 cm (3.5 in) long. The ellipsoidal, greenish yellow to brownish red fruits are fleshy and do not tear.

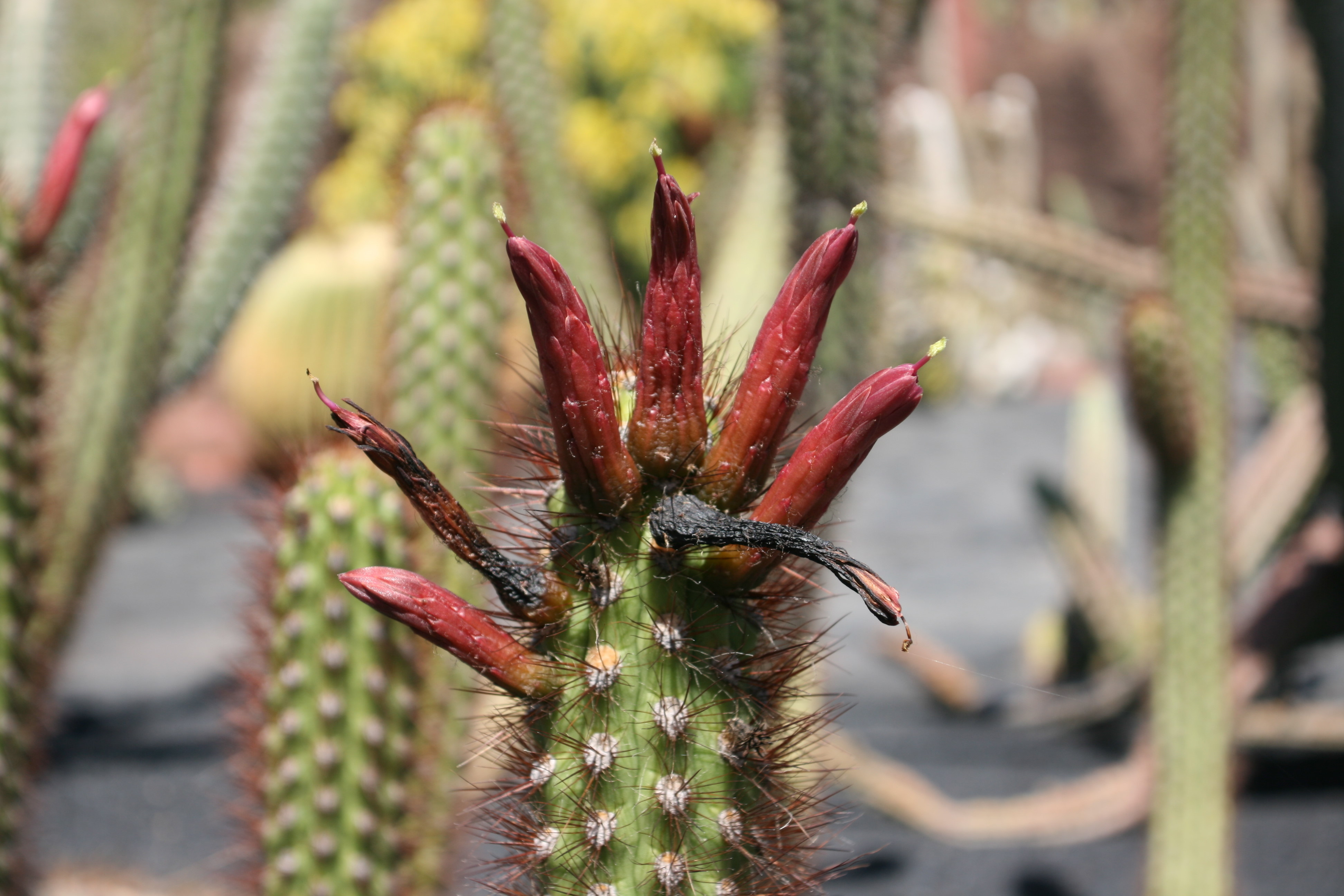
Flower buds

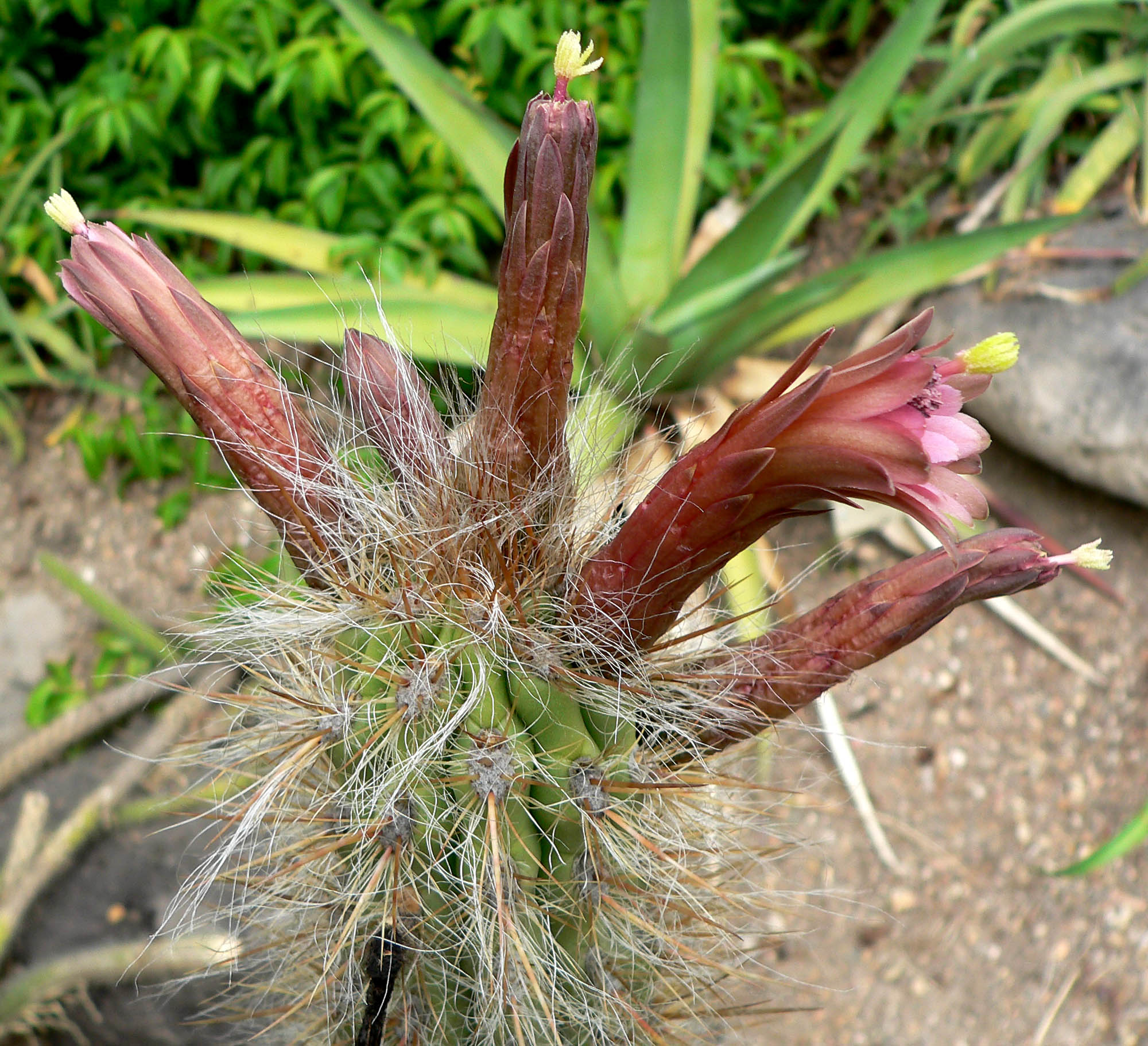
Flower

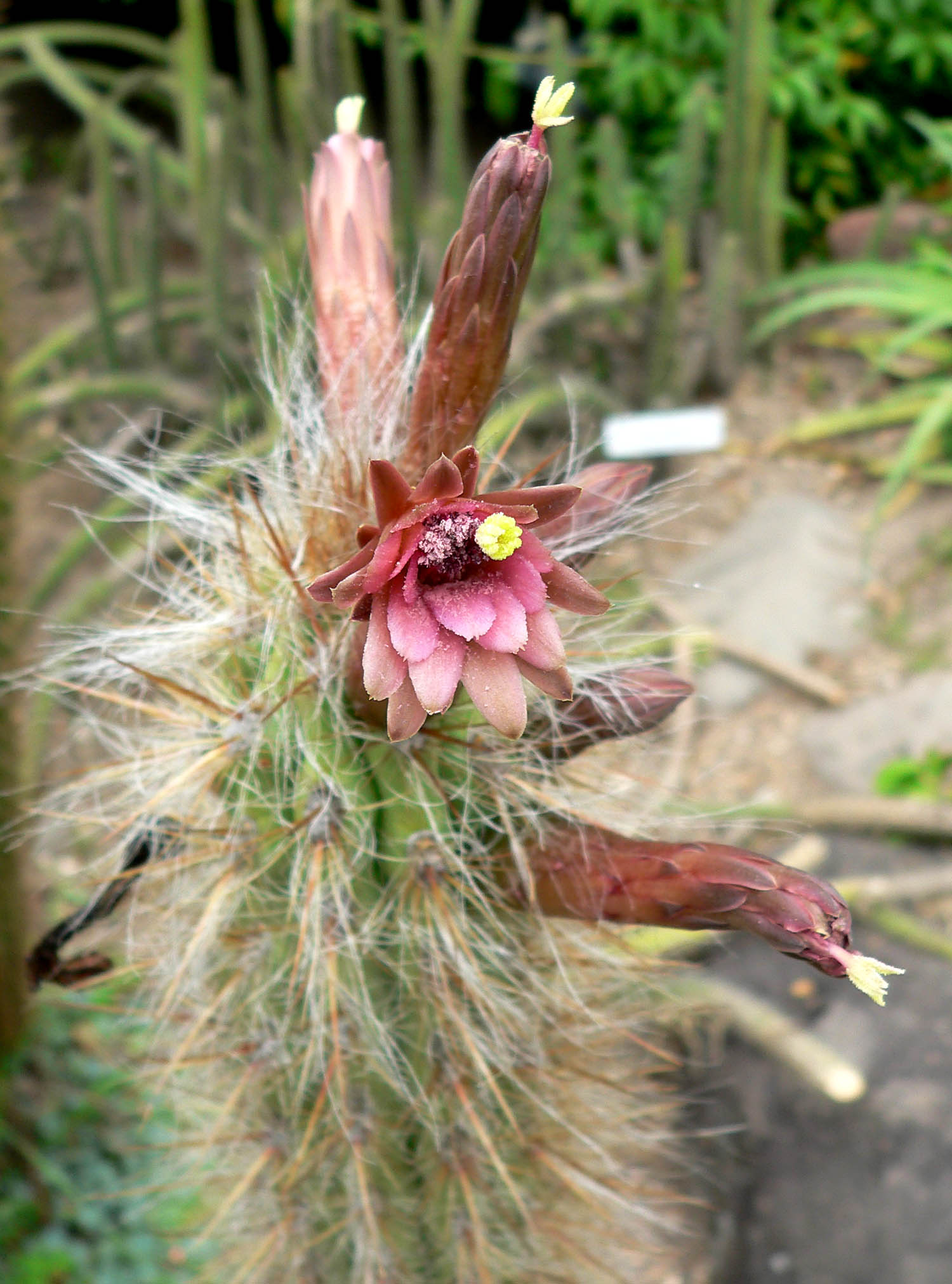
Flower

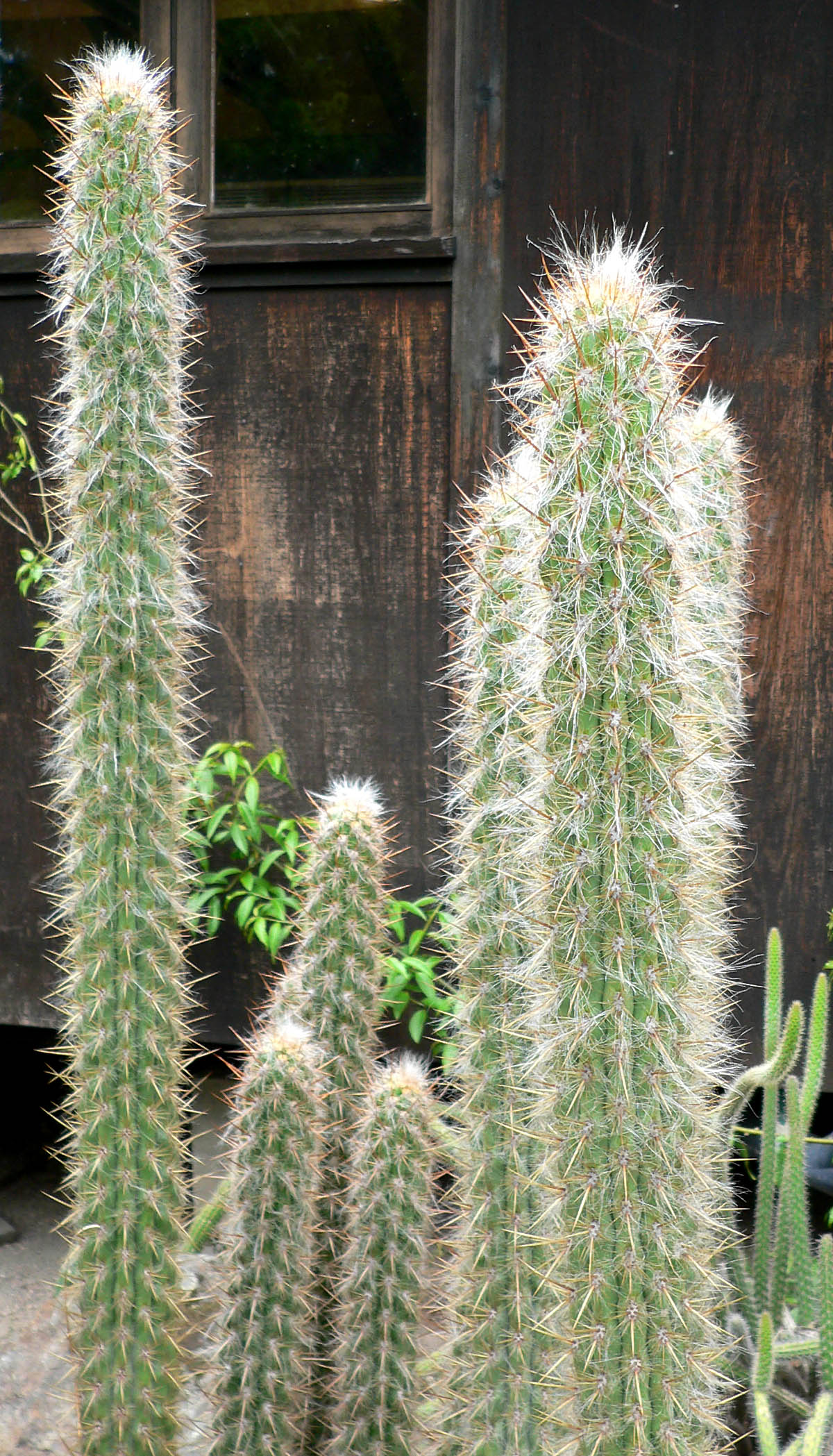
Habit

== Distribution ==
Oreocereus pseudofossulatus is widespread in the Bolivian department of La Paz in the valley of the Rio La Paz at altitudes of 1800 to 3800 meters.

== Taxonomy ==
The nomenclaturally correct first description was made in 1991 by David Richard Hunt.
