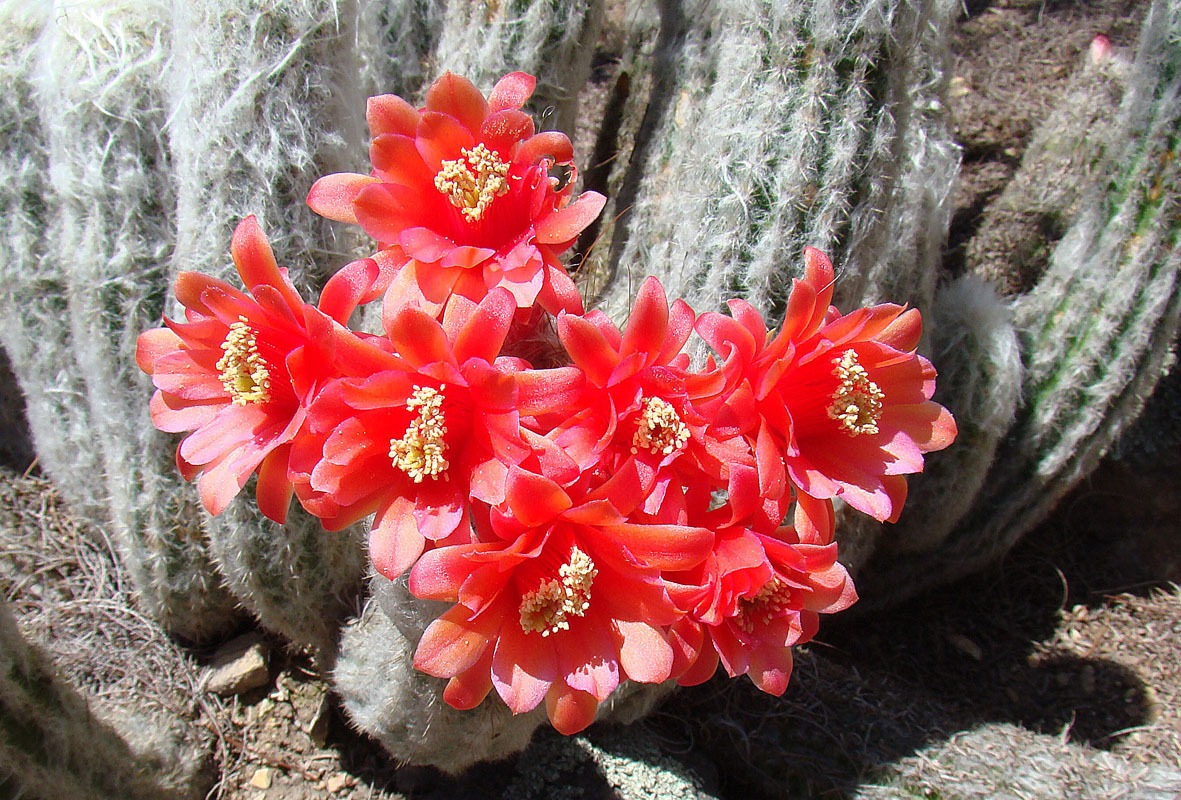

Conservation status
- Least Concern (IUCN 2.3)

Scientific classification
- Kingdom: Plantae
- Clade: Tracheophytes
- Clade: Angiosperms
- Clade: Eudicots
- Order: Caryophyllales
- Family: Cactaceae
- Subfamily: Cactoideae
- Genus: Oreocereus
- Species: O. doelzianus

Binomial name
- Oreocereus doelzianus (Backeb.) Borg

Synonyms
- Borzicactus doelzianus (Backeb.) Kimnach 1960; Morawetzia doelziana Backeb. 1936

= Oreocereus doelzianus =

Species of cactus

Oreocereus doelzianus is a species of cacti native to Peru.

== Description ==
Oreocereus doelzianus grows as a shrub with richly branched, cylindrical, olive-green shoots from the base and reaches heights of growth of up to 1 meter with a diameter of 6 to 8 cm (2.4 to 3.1 in). There are 10 to 11 ribs that are somewhat contracted between the gray felted areoles. The spines are yellow to dark brown. The four crossed central spines are strong and up to 4 cm (1.6 in) long. The 10 to 20 radial spines are up to 3 cm (1.2 in) long. The terminal cephalium consists of long, white, wavy hairs and whitish-yellow bristles up to 5 cm (2.0 in) long.

The carmine-red flowers have a bluish tinge and appear from the cephalium. They are up to 10 cm (3.9 in) long and have a diameter of 3 cm (1.2 in).

== Subspecies ==
Recognized Subspecies:

Image	Scientific name	Distribution
	Oreocereus doelzianus subsp. calvus (Rauh & Backeb.) Mottram	Rio Mantaro Valley, Peru
	Oreocereus doelzianus subsp. doelzianus	Ayacucho and Huancavelica, central Peru
	Oreocereus doelzianus subsp. sericatus (F.Ritter) Mottram	Ayacucho, central Peru

== Distribution ==
Oreocereus doelzianus is distributed in the Peruvian regions of Huancavelica and Ayacucho at altitudes of 2500 to 3000 meters.

== Taxonomy ==
The first description as Morawetzia doelziana was in 1936 by Curt Backeberg. The specific epithet doelzianus honors the German lawyer and cacti lover Bruno Dölz (1906–1945), who was President of the German Cactus Society from 1941 to 1945. John Borg placed them in the genus Oreocereus in 1937
