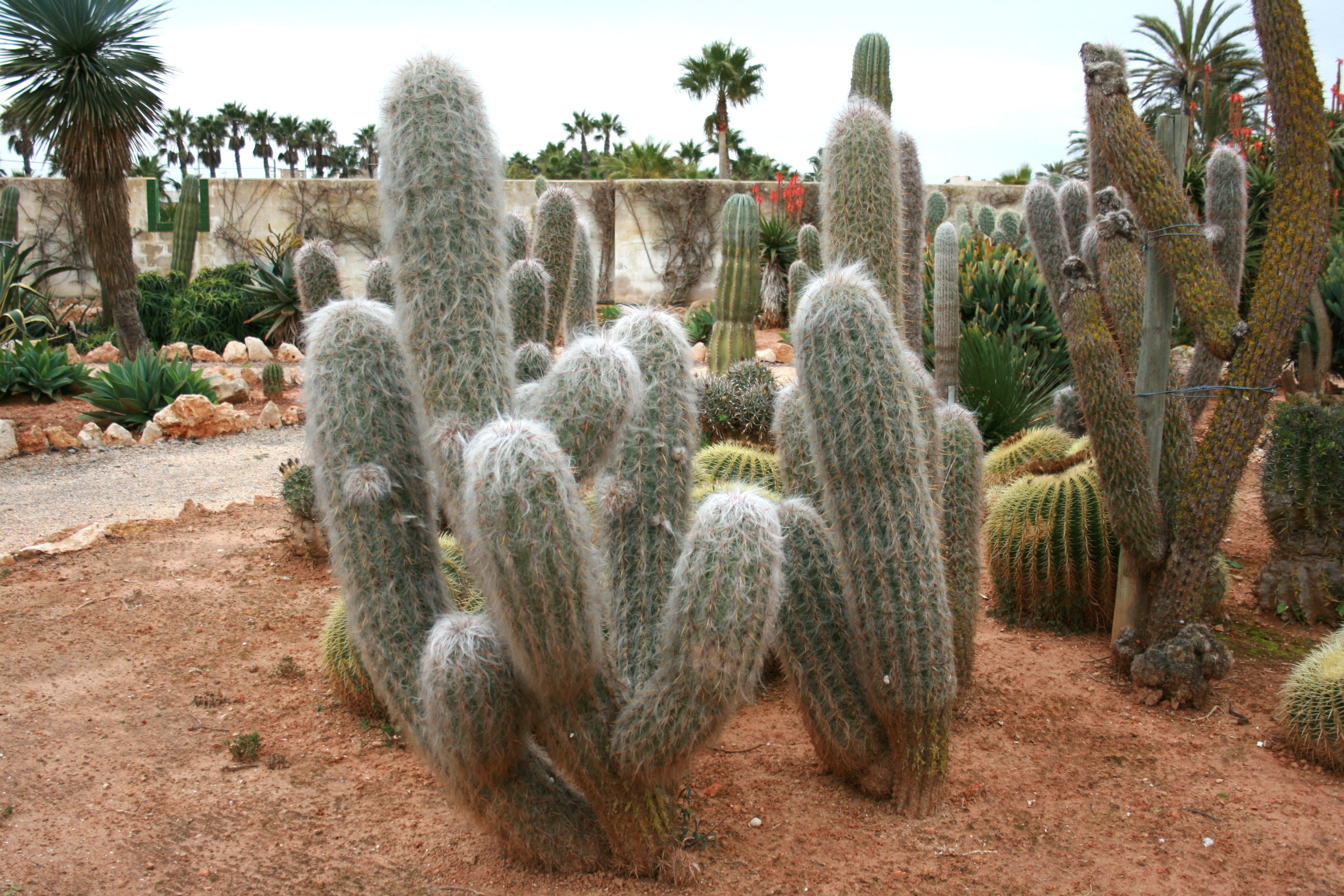
- A mature O. trollii

Conservation status
- Least Concern (IUCN 3.1)

Scientific classification
- Kingdom: Plantae
- Clade: Tracheophytes
- Clade: Angiosperms
- Clade: Eudicots
- Order: Caryophyllales
- Family: Cactaceae
- Subfamily: Cactoideae
- Genus: Oreocereus
- Species: O. trollii

Binomial name
- Oreocereus trollii (Kupper) Backeb.

Synonyms
- Borzicactus celsianus var. trollii (Kupper) G.D.Rowley; Borzicactus trollii (Kupper) Kimnach; Cereus trollii Kupper; Echinopsis trollii (Kupper) Anceschi & Magli; Oreocereus crassiniveus Backeb.; Oreocereus irigoyenii Frič; Oreocereus trollii var. crassiniveus (Backeb.) Backeb.; Oreocereus trollii var. tenuior Backeb.; Pilocereus trollii Kupper

= Oreocereus trollii =

Species of cactus

Oreocereus trollii, commonly known as the Old Man of the Andes cactus, is a species of cacti native to Argentina and Bolivia. Though listed as Least Concern by the IUCN, the plant is collected extensively, and in some areas is threatened.

== Description ==
Slow growing, O. trollii produces red flowers, typically after reaching several feet in height. Oreocereus trollii grows with shoots that branch out from the base, forms small groups and reaches heights of up to 50 cm (20 in). The short, columnar, light green shoots reach a diameter of 6 to 10 cm (2.4 to 3.9 in) and are densely wrapped in wool. There are 15 to 25 strongly tuberous ribs. The white areoles on it are covered with wool up to 7 cm (2.8 in) long. The resulting spines are yellow, reddish or brown. The strong, subulate three to five central spines are up to 5 cm (2.0 in) long and darker in color at the top. The 10 to 15 radial spines are bristle-like.

The pink to crimson flowers are up to 4 cm (1.6 in) long. The fruits are spherical.

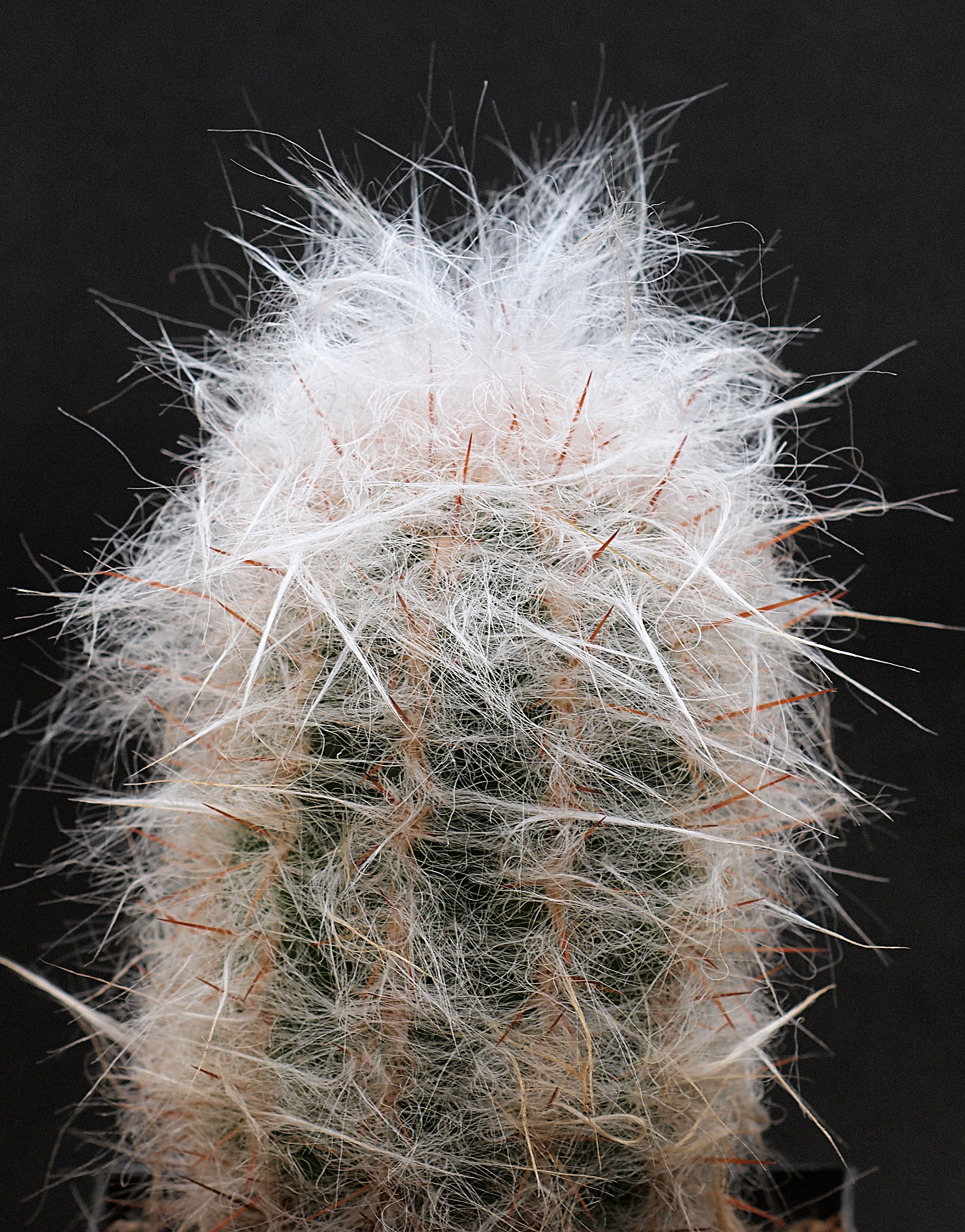
closeup of spines and hairs

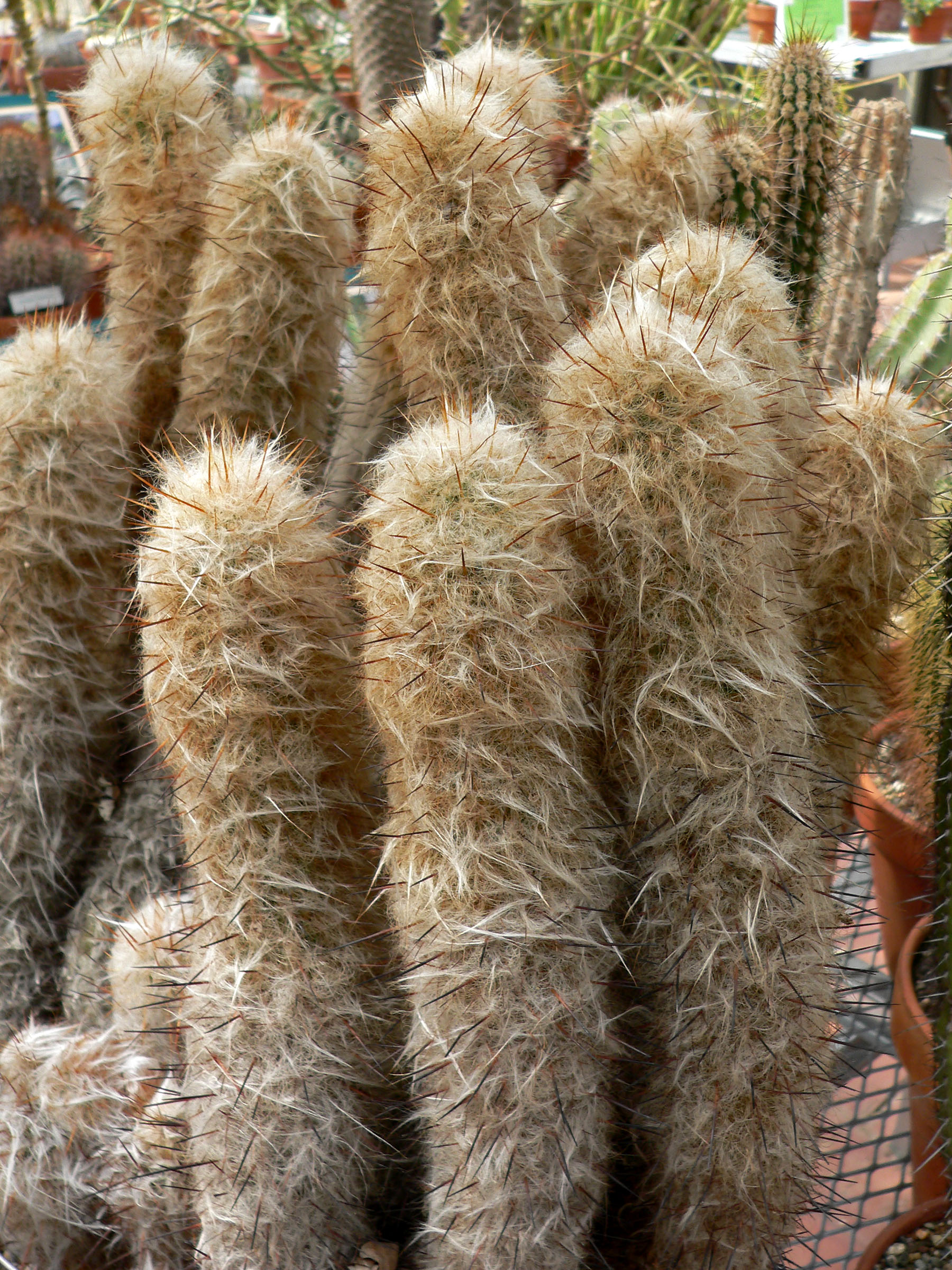
Plants

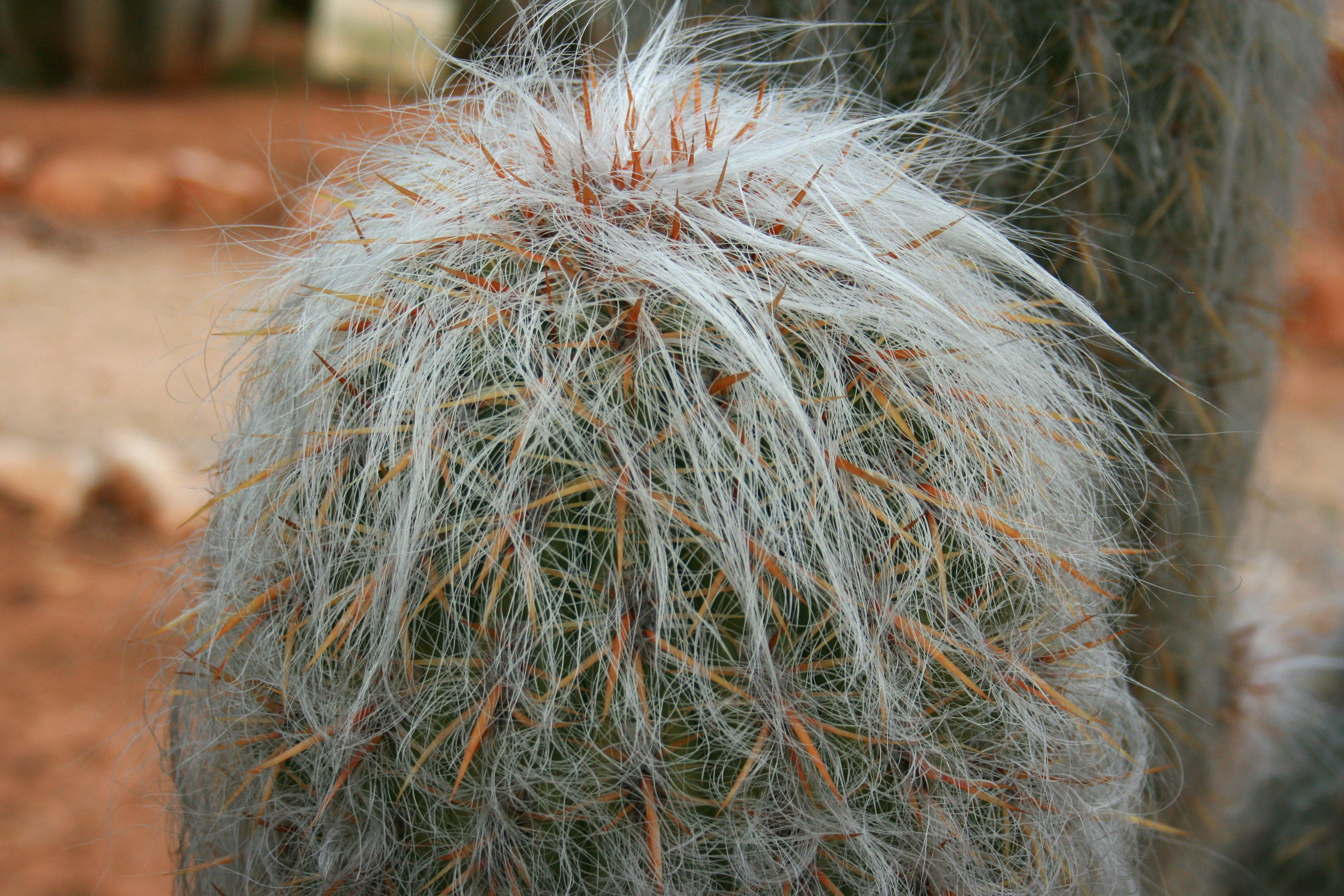
closeup of spines and hairs

== Distribution ==
Oreocereus trollii is distributed in the Bolivian departments of Chuquisaca, Oruro, Potosí and Tarija and in the Argentine province of Jujuy in the puna vegetation at altitudes of 3000 to 4000 meters.

== Taxonomy ==
Named after Wilhelm Troll, its common name comes from the abundant white hairs surrounding the plant which serve to protect it from scorching sunlight and frosts in its mountain habitat. The first description as Cereus trollii was made in 1929 by Walter Kupper. Curt Backeberg placed the species in the genus Oreocereus in 1936. Nomenclature synonyms are Borzicactus trollii (Kupper) Kimnach (1960), Echinopsis trollii (Kupper) Anceschi & Magli (2013), Pilocereus trollii Kupper (1929) and Borzicactus celsianus var. trollii (Kupper) G.D.Rowley (1986)
