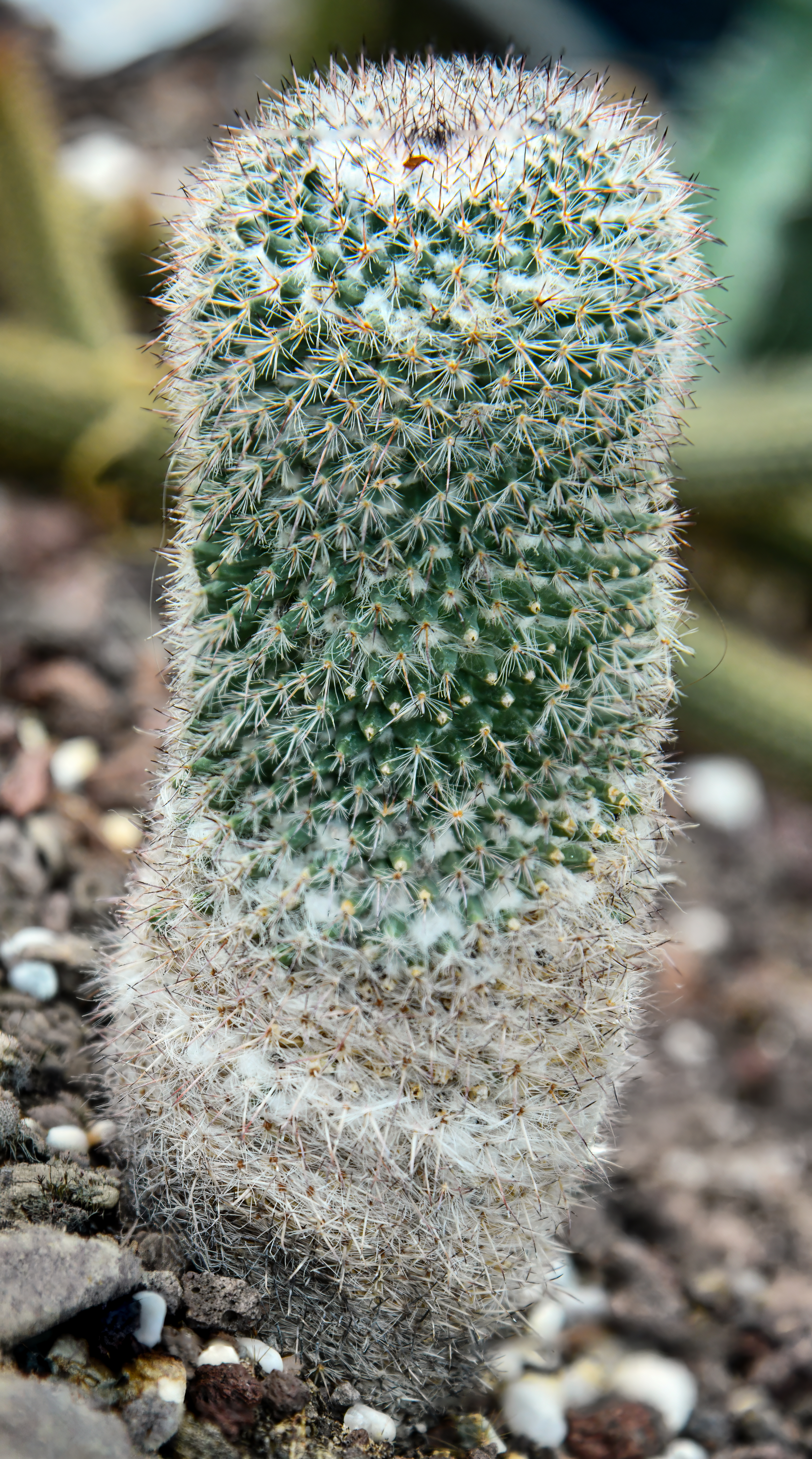

Conservation status
- Near Threatened (IUCN 3.1)

Scientific classification
- Kingdom: Plantae
- Clade: Tracheophytes
- Clade: Angiosperms
- Clade: Eudicots
- Order: Caryophyllales
- Family: Cactaceae
- Subfamily: Cactoideae
- Genus: Mammillaria
- Species: M. hahniana

Binomial name
- Mammillaria hahniana Werd.

= Mammillaria hahniana =

Species of cactus

Mammillaria hahniana, the old lady cactus, is a species of flowering plant in the family Cactaceae, native to central Mexico. It grows to 25 cm (10 in) tall by 50 cm (20 in) broad. The solitary spherical stems, 12 cm in diameter, are covered in white down and white spines. Reddish purple flowers are borne in spring and summer, sometimes forming a complete ring around the apex of the plant.

Its status is listed as "Near Threatened" by the IUCN Red List.

== Cultivation ==
Mammillaria hahniana is one of several Mammillaria species to be cultivated. In temperate regions it must be grown under glass with heat. However, some growers report that it is quite hardy down to −5 °C (23 °F) or even −10 °C (14 °F). Like all cacti it must be kept dry in winter, and fed and watered during the active growth cycle in summer. Increasing quite readily and flowering at a relatively early age, it is a suitable subject for domestic cultivation. It has gained the Royal Horticultural Society's Award of Garden Merit.

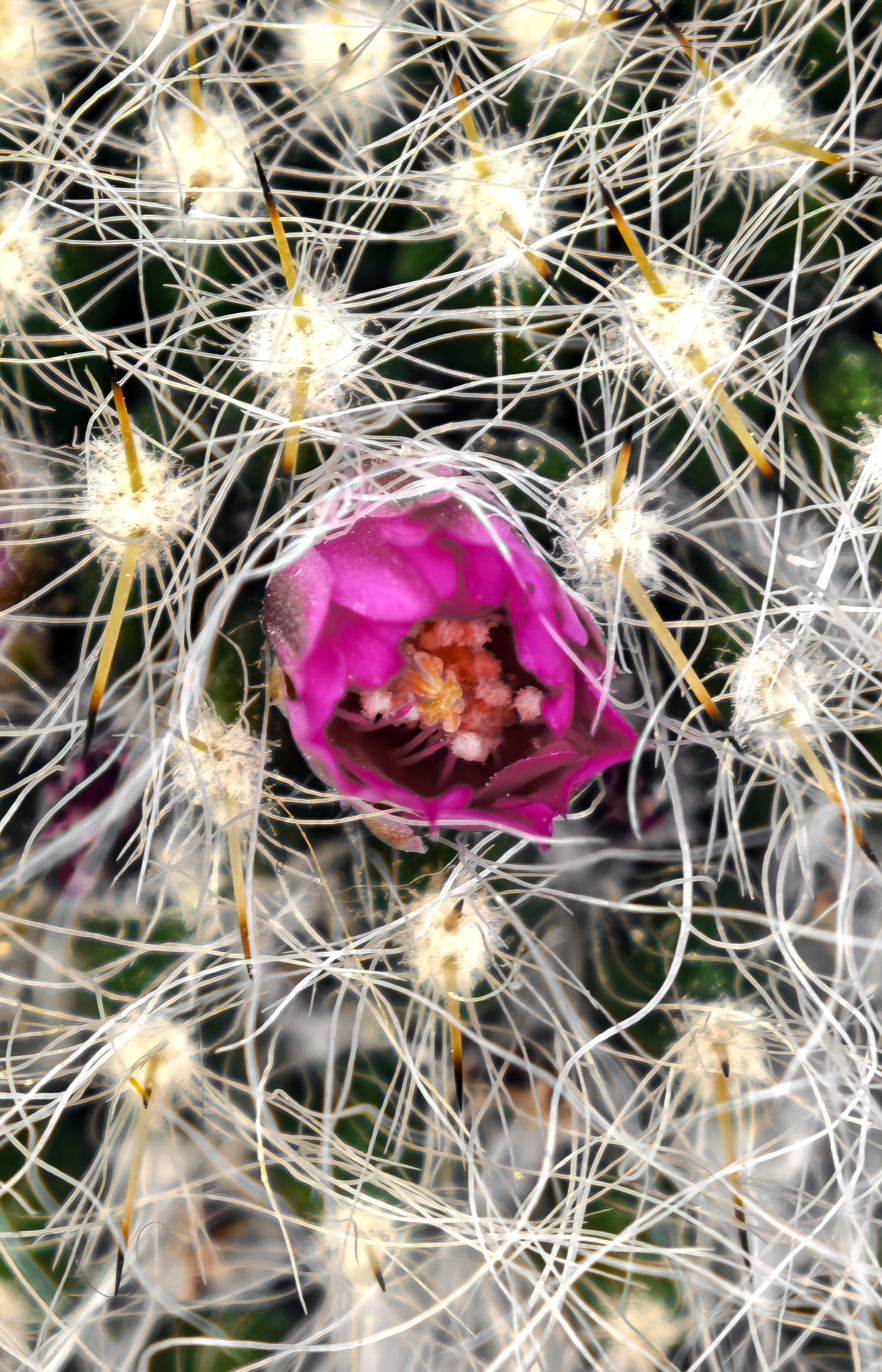
Thorns and flower

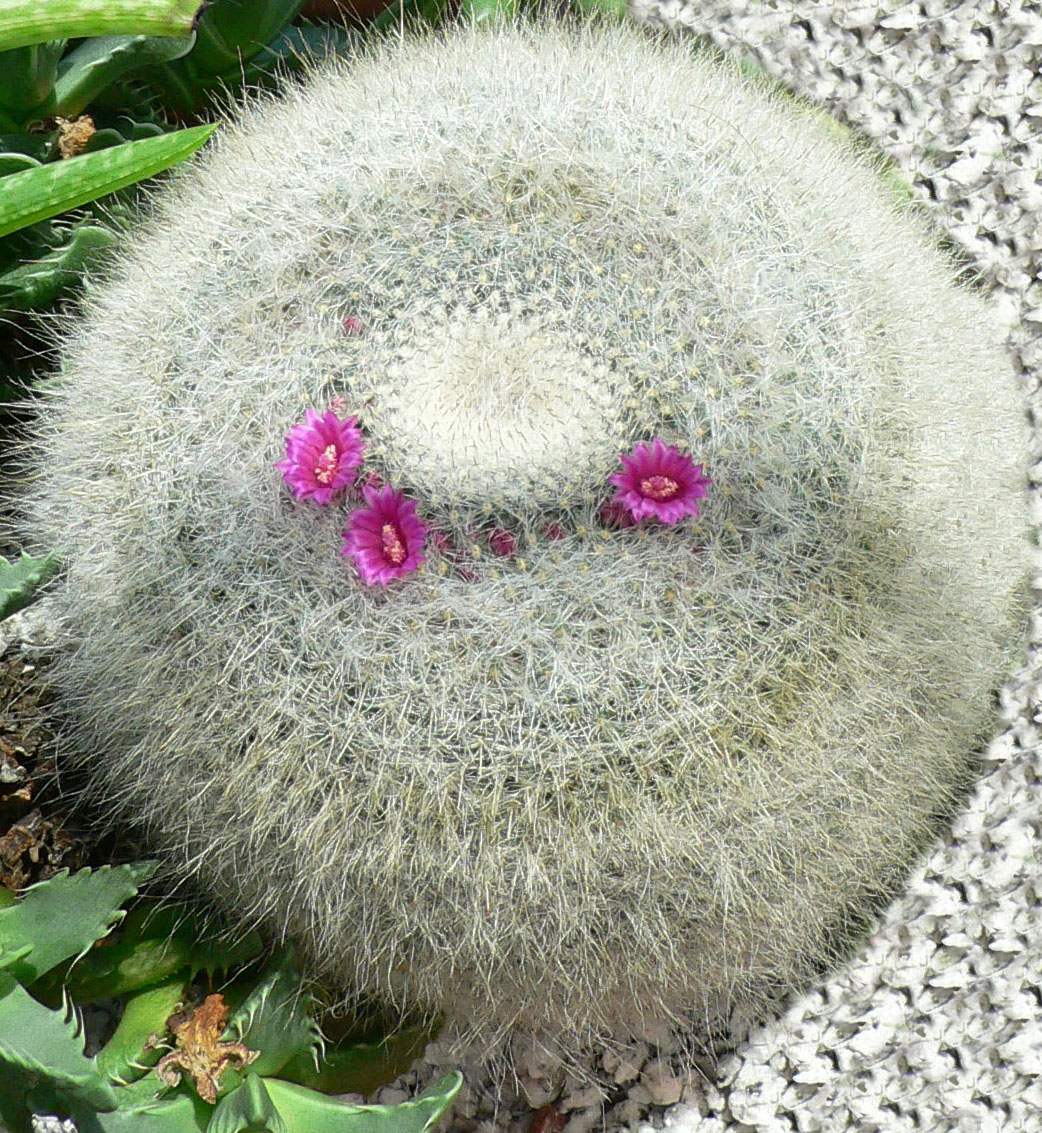
