= Vincenzo Riccobono =

Italian botanist (1861–1943)

Vincenzo Riccobono (1861–1943) was an Italian botanist who researched extensively on cacti. He described the genus Trichocereus, now sunk into Echinopsis. While collecting specimens in Libya in 1943, he was shot dead by American soldiers after running away from them at a security checkpoint.
