= Loxanthocereus sulcifer =

Conservation status
- Endangered (IUCN 3.1)

Scientific classification
- Kingdom: Plantae
- Clade: Tracheophytes
- Clade: Angiosperms
- Clade: Eudicots
- Order: Caryophyllales
- Family: Cactaceae
- Subfamily: Cactoideae
- Genus: Loxanthocereus
- Species: L. sulcifer

Binomial name
- Loxanthocereus sulcifer Rauh & Backeb.

Synonyms
- Borzicactus sulcifer (Rauh & Backeb.) Kimnach; Cleistocactus granditessellatus (Rauh & Backeb.) Leuenb.; Cleistocactus sulcifer (Rauh & Backeb.) Leuenb.; Loxanthocereus granditessellatus Rauh & Backeb.

Species of plant

Loxanthocereus sulcifer is a species of succulent flowering plant in the genus Loxanthocereus, within the family Cactaceae. It is endemic to the departments of La Libertad, Lima, and Áncash in western Peru.

== Description ==
Loxanthocereus sulcifer is a species of shrubby cactus that branches somewhat and has stems which are ascending to decumbent in habit, with erect apices. The stems measure 1 to 2 meters in length and 2.5 to 5 cm in diameter. The epidermis is green in color.

Flower

The stems have 8 to 12 ribs, which are divided by transverse grooves into elongated, hexagonal tubercles, on which are situated the areoles. There is also a short, vertical groove situated above each areole. The areoles are separated by a distance of approximately 1 cm and have 5 to 15 spines each, which are brown to grayish in color with brown tips. Each areole has 0 to 2 subulate and spreading central spines, which measure 1 to 5 cm in length, as well as radial spines that measure 0.5 to 1 cm, which vary in form from subulate to acicular.

The flowers develop laterally and are very morphologically variable. They measure 5 to 9.5 cm in length and are tubular-infundibuliform in shape, with an oblique margin and a diameter of 3 to 6 cm. Their color varies from red to salmon. The pericarpel is covered in long, woolly trichomes that are brown to grayish in color, while the floral tube has looser wool that is white to brown in color.

The fruits are globose and greenish in color. They measure approximately 1 cm in diameter. The surface exhibits scales and trichomes.

== Distribution and habitat ==
Loxanthocereus sulcifer is native to the departments of La Libertad, Lima, and Áncash in western Peru. Here, it is found primarily in deserts and dry shrubland at altitudes of 2400 to 3000 meters above see level. It grows in inter-Andean valleys.

== Taxonomy ==
Loxanthocereus sulcifer was described by the German botanists Werner Rauh and Curt Backeberg, who published the name for the first time in the book Descriptiones Cactacearum Novarum 1: 14 in 1957.

Etymology

- Loxanthocereus: The genus name is derived from the Greek word loxos (meaning "inclined"), the Greek word anthos (meaning "flower"), and the Latin word cereus (meaning "candle"). This name references the inclined, zygomorphic flowers of the plants in this genus, which develop on long and straight stems.
- sulcifer: the specific epithet is derived from the Latin words sulcus (meaning "groove") and -fer (meaning "-bearing"). This name refers to the transverse ribs between this species' tubercles.

== Conservation status ==
On the IUCN Red List, Loxanthocereus sulcifer is classified as being Endangered (EN), meaning that it is at high risk of being driven to extinction in the wild.

This classification is given because of the species' restricted geographical distribution (approximately 1000 km^{2}). It is only known from three localities, where it is common but not abundant. However, even though it is not precisely known what factors threaten the species' survival, reduction of its distribution and degradation of its habitat have been observed.

== Cultivation ==
Loxanthocereus sulcifer is primarily grown as an ornamental. In cultivation, it requires intense but indirect sunlight, or slightly filtered morning sunlight. It should be kept in a well-ventilated environment. Its substrate should be mainly mineral in composition (with ingredients such as pumice and gravel) and low in organic matter in order to imitate the plant's natural habitat, where it grows in rocky, gravelly soils.

During the summer, when the plant is actively growing, irrigation should be regular, but it should be ensured that the soil dries out completely between waterings. In winter, the plant undergoes a dormant period, during which it should be kept completely dry. Excessive watering or an excessive amount of organic matter in the soil frequently leads to root rot. Insufficient light levels cause the plant to become etiolated and produce long, weak stems that lose their natural color.

This species may be propagated via cuttings or seed.

== Gallery ==
In habitat in Trujillo, La Libertad, Peru

Growth form

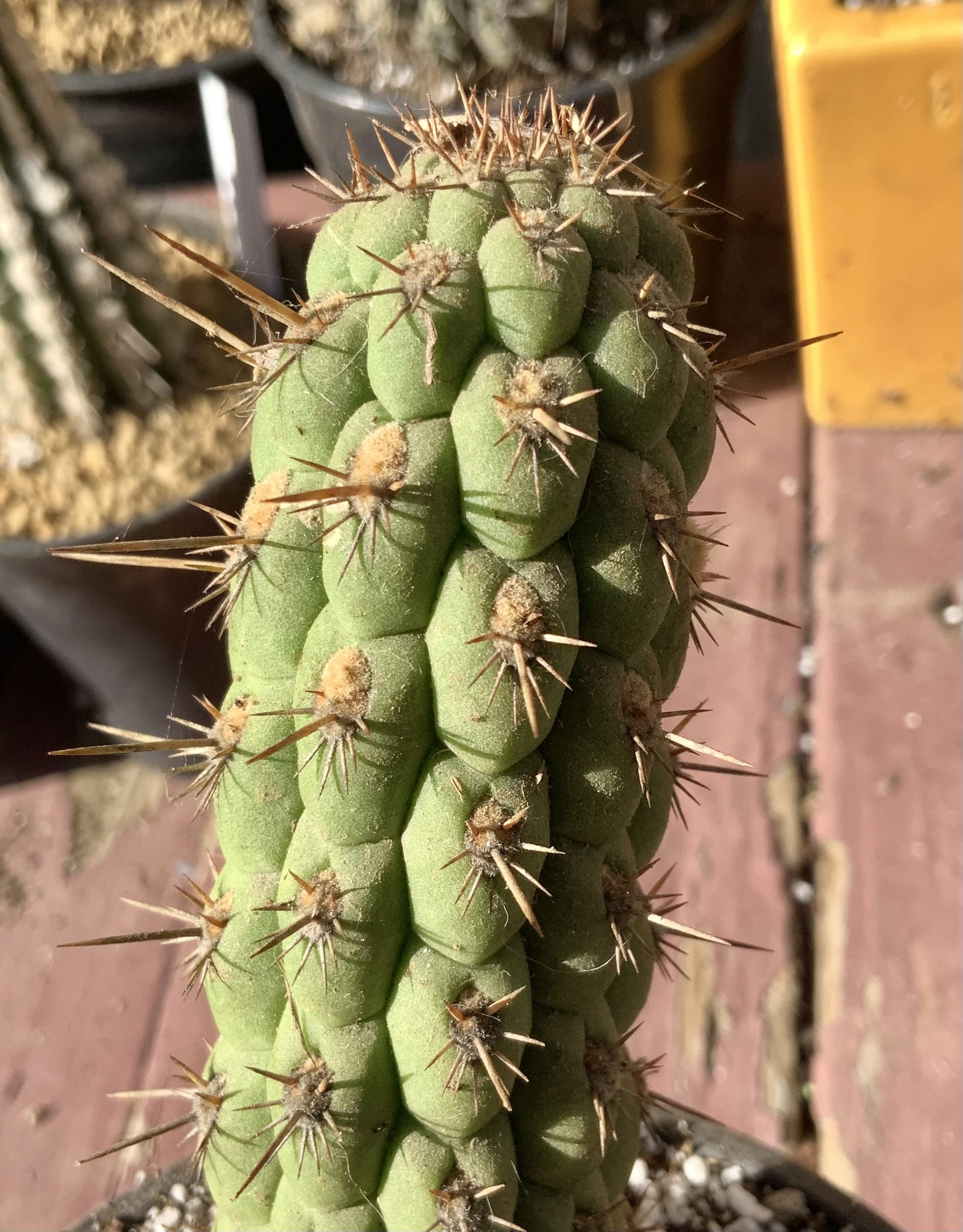
Stem

Plant in flower

Plant with flower and developing fruit
