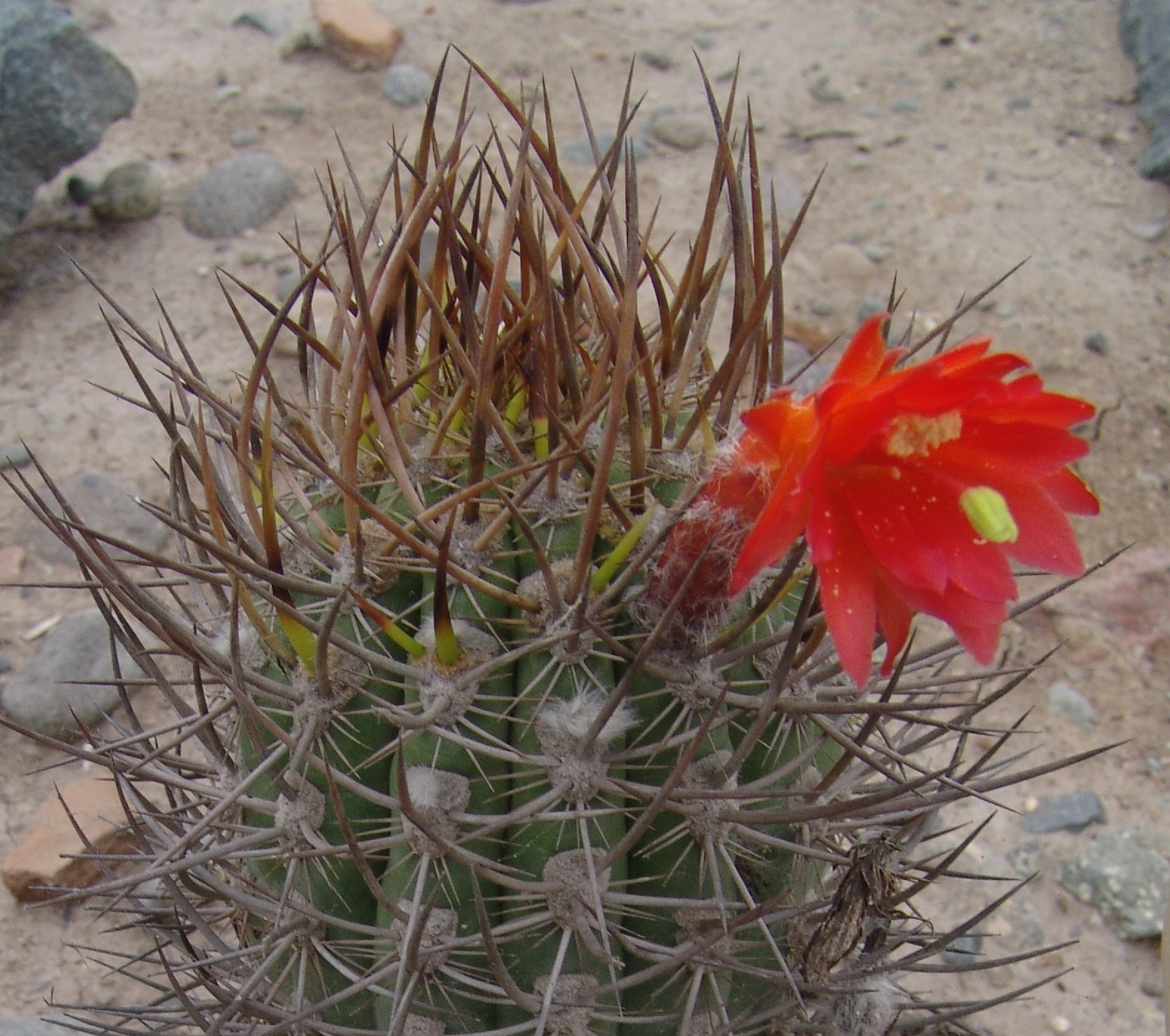

Conservation status
- Critically Endangered (IUCN 3.1)

Scientific classification
- Kingdom: Plantae
- Clade: Embryophytes
- Clade: Tracheophytes
- Clade: Spermatophytes
- Clade: Angiosperms
- Clade: Eudicots
- Order: Caryophyllales
- Family: Cactaceae
- Subfamily: Cactoideae
- Genus: Loxanthocereus
- Species: L. xylorhizus

Binomial name
- Loxanthocereus xylorhizus F.Ritter

Synonyms
- Borzicactus xylorhizus (F.Ritter) G.J.Charles 2012; Cleistocactus xylorhizus (F.Ritter) Ostolaza 1996; Echinopsis xylorhiza (F.Ritter) Molinari 2015

= Loxanthocereus xylorhizus =

Species of cactus

Loxanthocereus xylorhizus is a species of Loxanthocereus found in Peru.

== Description ==
The species grows as a shrub with spread-out or somewhat upright, gray-green shoots and reaches lengths of 20–50 cm (7.9–19.7 in) (rarely up to 1 meter) with diameters of 5 to 7 cm (2.0 to 2.8 in) and 14 to 19 notched ribs. The areoles have 3-4 central spines that are straight or upwardly curved, thick and subulate, 4–5 cm (1.6–2.0 in) long and 16 to 22 marginal radial spines brownish yellow and up to 1 cm (0.39 in) long. The spines have a characteristic arrangement in multiple directions. The flowers are oblique tubular, 6–7 cm (2.4–2.8 in) long and vermilion-red in color, and they produce greenish to reddish brown globular fruits about 2–3 cm (0.79–1.18 in) in diameter.

== Distribution ==
Loxanthocereus xylorhizus is found in the Lima region of Peru in the mountains around Chosica at altitudes of 800 to 900 meters.

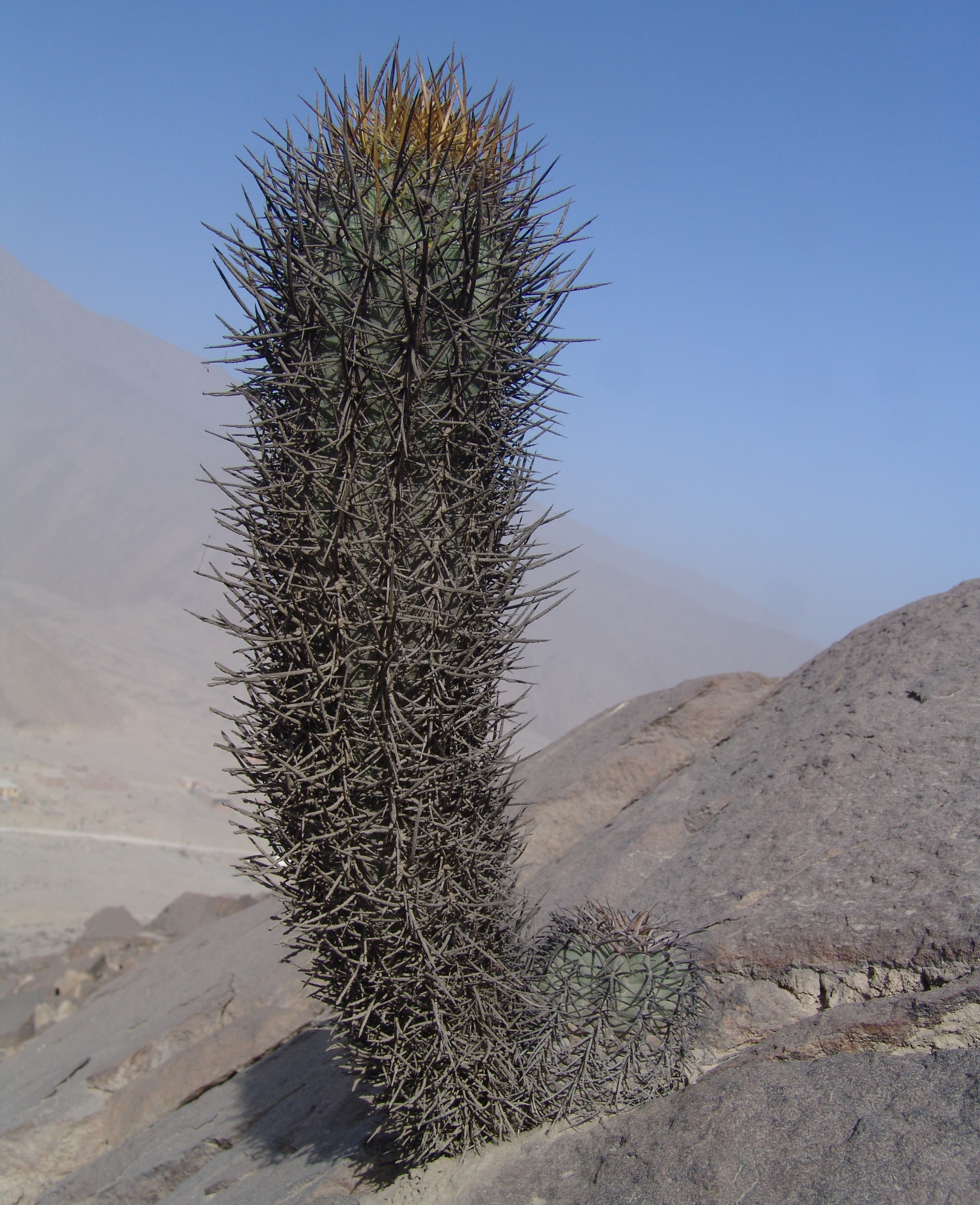
L. xylorhizus in Lima, Peru

== Taxonomy ==
The first description as Loxanthocereus xylorhizus was made in 1981 by Friedrich Ritter. It was described in Quebrada California, Chaclacayo, Lima, where there are almost no specimens. There are several populations found in the Quebrada Yanacoto in Chontay, Cieneguilla, in the heights of Chosica and in Huinco, in the Santa Eulalia Valley, Huarochirí. Graham J. Charles placed the species in the genus Borzicactus in 2012 due to the flowers being oblique and zygomorphic, open at the tip, not tubular, closed at the apex as in Cleistocactus. Further nomenclature synonyms are Cleistocactus xylorhizus (F.Ritter) Ostolaza (1996) and Echinopsis xylorhiza (F.Ritter) Molinari (2015).
