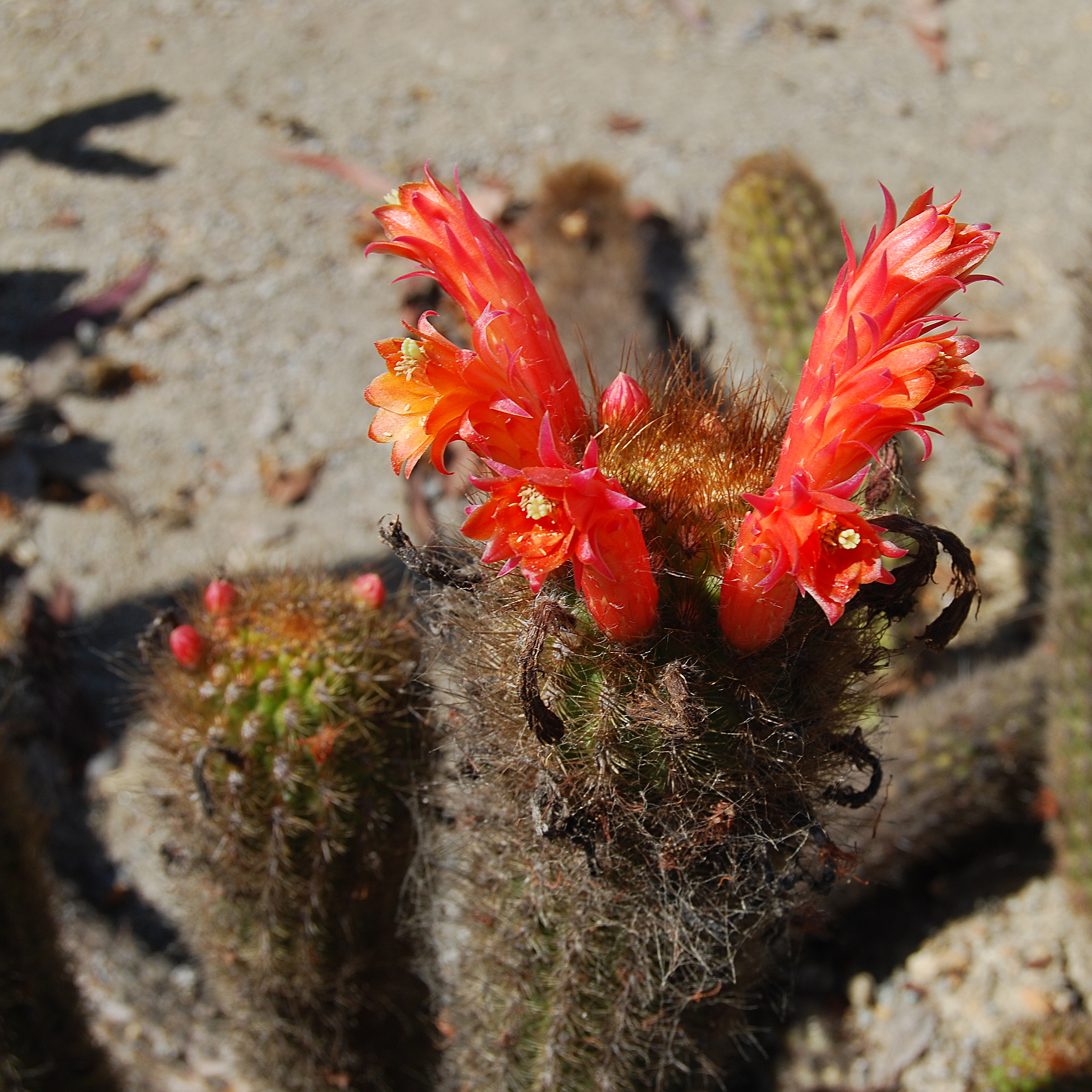

Conservation status
- Near Threatened (IUCN 3.1)

Scientific classification
- Kingdom: Plantae
- Clade: Tracheophytes
- Clade: Angiosperms
- Clade: Eudicots
- Order: Caryophyllales
- Family: Cactaceae
- Subfamily: Cactoideae
- Genus: Loxanthocereus
- Species: L. acanthurus

Binomial name
- Loxanthocereus acanthurus (Vaupel) Backeb. 1937

Synonyms
- Binghamia acanthura (Vaupel) Borg 1851; Borzicactus acanthurus (Vaupel) Britton & Rose 1920; Cereus acanthurus Vaupel 1913; Cleistocactus acanthurus (Vaupel) D.R.Hunt 1987; Echinopsis acanthura (Vaupel) Molinari 2015

= Loxanthocereus acanthurus =

Species of cactus

Loxanthocereus acanthurus is a species of Loxanthocereus found in Peru.

== Description ==
Loxanthocereus acanthurus grows shrubby with prostrate to creeping, ascending or hanging, up to 30 centimeters (rarely up to 50 centimeters) long shoots that have a diameter of 2-5 centimeters. There are 15-18 low, rounded ribs divided by sharp indentations into indistinct protuberances. The 2-5 (rarely up to 6) central spines are yellowish and up to 1.5 centimeters long. They are difficult to distinguish from the 20-40 short, thin, yellowish radial spines.

The straight or slightly curved, crooked, scarlet flowers are 4 to 9.5 inches long. The spherical fruits reach a diameter of 2 to 2.5 centimeters.

== Subspecies ==
There are two recognized subspecies:

Image	Name	Distribution
	Loxanthocereus acanthurus subsp. acanthurus	Peru
	Loxanthocereus acanthurus subsp. pullatus (Rauh & Backeb.) Ostolaza	Peru

== Distribution ==
Loxanthocereus acanthurus is distributed in the Peruvian regions of Ancash, Lima and Ica at altitudes of 300 to 2500 meters.

== Taxonomy ==
The first description as Cereus acanthurus was in 1913 by Friedrich Karl Johann Vaupel. The specific epithet acanthurus is derived from the Greek words akanthos for 'thorn' and oura for 'tail' and refers to the dense spines on the shoots of the species. Other nomenclature synonyms are Borzicactus acanthurus (Vaupel) Britton and Rose (1920), Binghamia acanthura (Vaupel) Borg (1951), Cleistocactus acanthurus (Vaupel) DR Hunt (1987) and Echinopsis acanthura (Vaupel) Molinari (2015).
