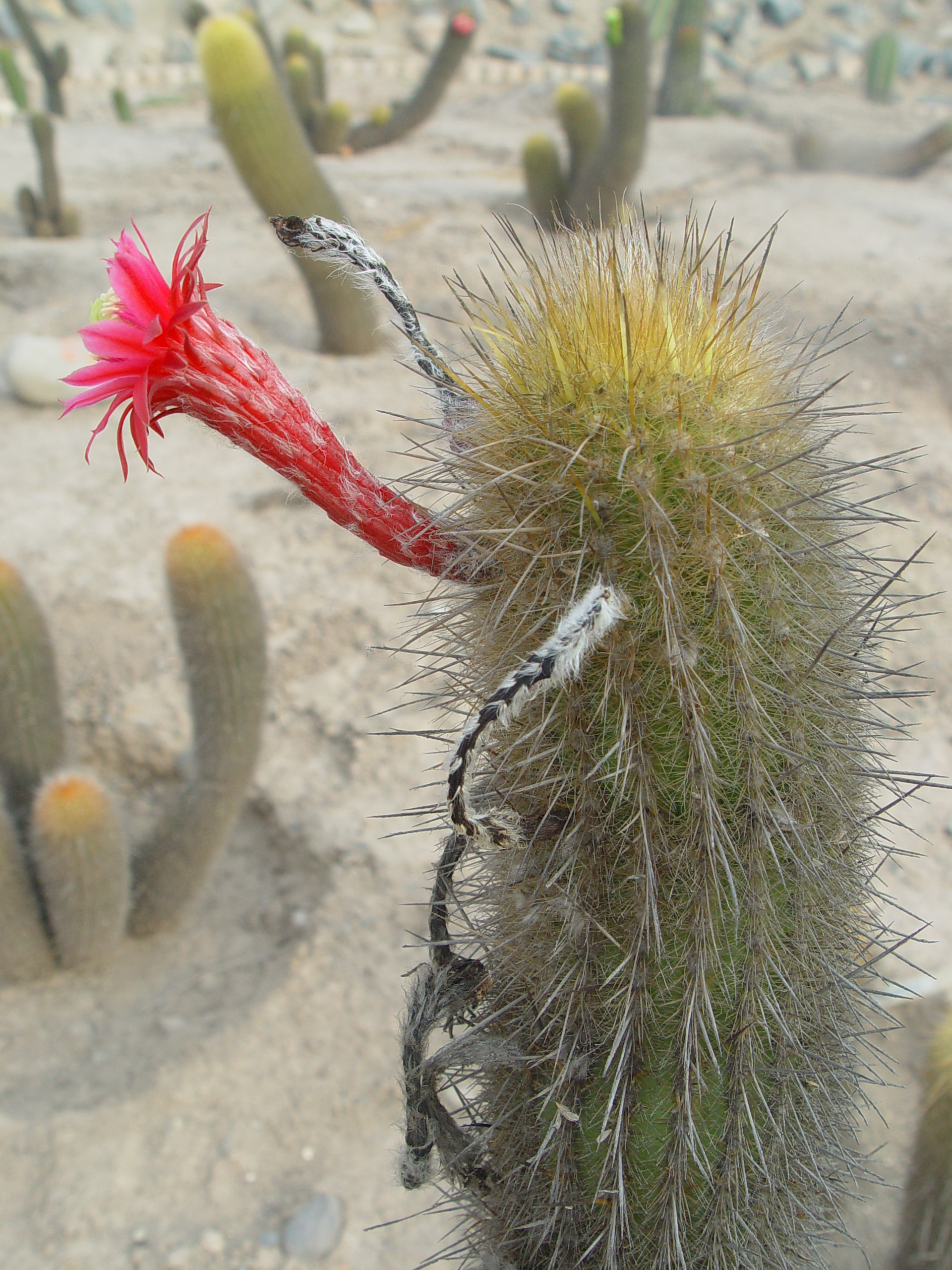
- Loxanthocereus faustianus

Scientific classification
- Kingdom: Plantae
- Clade: Tracheophytes
- Clade: Angiosperms
- Clade: Eudicots
- Order: Caryophyllales
- Family: Cactaceae
- Subfamily: Cactoideae
- Tribe: Cereeae
- Subtribe: Trichocereinae
- Genus: Loxanthocereus; Backeb.

Type species
- Loxanthocereus acanthurus

Species
- see text

= Loxanthocereus =

Genus of cacti

Loxanthocereus is a genus of cacti native to Peru.

== Species ==
Species of the genus Loxanthocereus according to Plants of the World Online as of July 2023:

image	Scientific name	Distribution
	Loxanthocereus acanthurus (Vaupel) Backeb.	Peru
	Loxanthocereus camanaensis Rauh & Backeb.	Peru
	Loxanthocereus clavispinus Rauh & Backeb.	Peru
	Loxanthocereus faustianus (Backeb.) Backeb.	Peru
	Loxanthocereus hoffmannii F.Ritter	Peru
	Loxanthocereus hoxeyi (G.J.Charles) Lodé	Peru
	Loxanthocereus hystrix Rauh & Backeb.	Peru
	Loxanthocereus jajoanus (Backeb.) Backeb.	Peru
	Loxanthocereus pachycladus Rauh & Backeb.	Peru
	Loxanthocereus peculiaris Rauh & Backeb.	Peru
	Loxanthocereus sextonianus (Backeb.) Backeb.	Peru
	Loxanthocereus sulcifer Rauh & Backeb.	Peru
	Loxanthocereus xylorhizus F.Ritter	Peru
