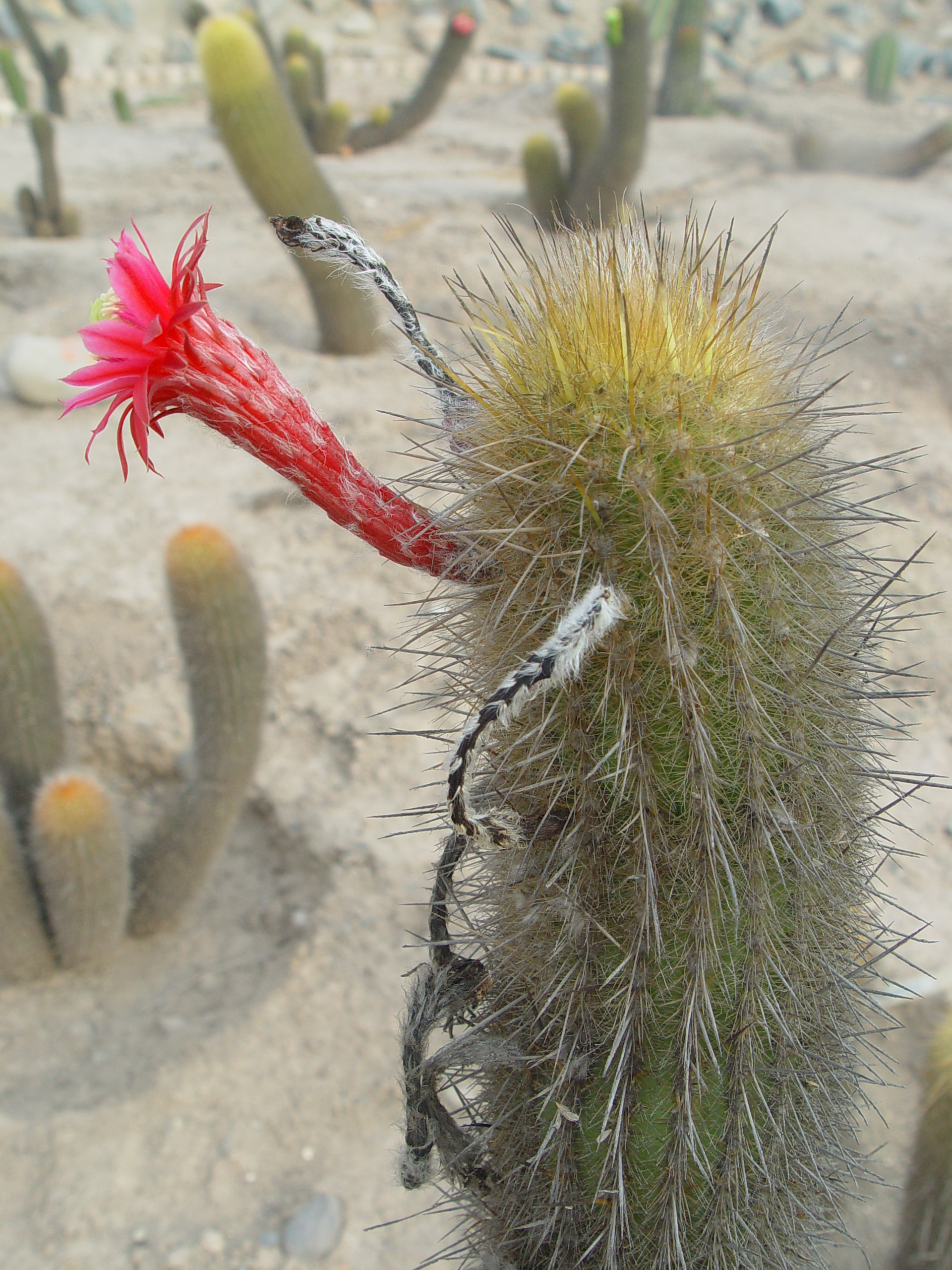

Scientific classification
- Kingdom: Plantae
- Clade: Tracheophytes
- Clade: Angiosperms
- Clade: Eudicots
- Order: Caryophyllales
- Family: Cactaceae
- Subfamily: Cactoideae
- Genus: Loxanthocereus
- Species: L. faustianus

Binomial name
- Loxanthocereus faustianus (Backeb.) Backeb.

Synonyms
- Borzicactus acanthurus subsp. faustianus (Backeb.) G.J.Charles 2012; Borzicactus faustianus Backeb. 1933; Cleistocactus acanthurus subsp. faustianus (Backeb.) Ostolaza 1998; Cleistocactus acanthurus var. faustianus (Backeb.) Ostolaza 1996; Echinopsis acanthura subsp. faustiana (Backeb.) Molinari & Mayta 2015

= Loxanthocereus faustianus =

Species of cactus

Loxanthocereus faustianus is a species of Loxanthocereus found in Peru.

== Description ==
Columnar cactus branching from the base. The stems grows between 40 cm (16 in) and 45 cm (18 in) in height and up to 8 cm in diameter, and have about 18 closely spaced ribs with 1 to 5 (or even 20) central spines approximately 2 to 2.5 cm long and 20 to 30 radial spines 30 to 80 mm long. The flowers are red-orange tubular, about 4 to 6 cm long and red in color, producing greenish to reddish to brown spiny fruits about 2 to 2.5 cm in diameter with brown-black seeds.

== Distribution ==
Plants are found in Lima, Peru in the valleys of Chillón, Rímac and Santa Eulalia at elevations around 1260 meters.
