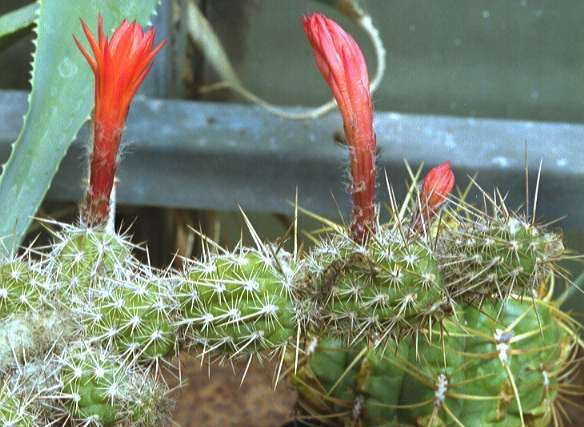

Scientific classification
- Kingdom: Plantae
- Clade: Tracheophytes
- Clade: Angiosperms
- Clade: Eudicots
- Order: Caryophyllales
- Family: Cactaceae
- Subfamily: Cactoideae
- Genus: Loxanthocereus
- Species: L. sextonianus

Binomial name
- Loxanthocereus sextonianus (Backeb.) Backeb.

Synonyms
- Borzicactus sextonianus (Backeb.) Kimnach 1960; Cleistocactus sextonianus (Backeb.) D.R.Hunt 2003; Echinopsis sextoniana (Backeb.) Mayta 2015; Erdisia sextoniana Backeb. 1936; Borzicactus gracilis (Akers & Buining) Buxb. & Krainz 1962; Borzicactus gracilis var. aticensis (Rauh & Backeb.) Krainz 1962; Cereus sextonianus Backeb. 1933; Cleistocactus sextonianus (Backeb.) D.R.Hunt 1991; Loxanthocereus aticensis Rauh & Backeb. 1956 publ. 1957; Loxanthocereus gracilis (Akers & Buining) Backeb. 1958; Loxanthocereus nanus Backeb. 1956 publ. 1957; Loxanthocereus puquiensis F.Ritter 1981; Loxanthocereus splendens Backeb. 1956 publ. 1957; Loxanthocereus variabilis F.Ritter 1981; Maritimocereus gracilis Akers & Buining 1950

= Loxanthocereus sextonianus =

Species of cactus

Loxanthocereus sextonianus is a species of Loxanthocereus found in Peru.

== Description ==
Loxanthocereus sextonianus grows as a shrub with mostly prostrate, underground shoots and reaches lengths of up to 1.5 meters with diameters of 3 centimeters with 13 ribs. The areoles on the stem are small and close together with thin, radiating spines are pink to yellow to brown. The spines are difficult to distinguish between central and radial spines. The 1 to 3 central spines are up to 3 centimeters long, the 8 to 30 radial spines are up to 5 millimeters long.

The heavily crooked, red flowers are 5 to 6 centimeters (rarely up to 8 centimeters) long. Its pericarpel and flower tube are loosely furred brown. The more or less spherical, green fruits reach a diameter of 1.5 to 2 centimeters.

== Distribution ==
Loxanthocereus sextonianus is widespread in the Peruvian departments of Ica, Ayacucho, Arequipa, Moquegua, and Tacna at altitudes of 200 to 1500 meters.

== Taxonomy ==
The first description as Erdisia sextoniana was made in 1936 by Curt Backeberg. Myron William Kimnach placed the species in the genus Borzicactus in 1960. Further nomenclature synonyms are Borzicactus sextonianus (Backeb.) Kimnach.(1931), Cereus sextonianus Backeb. (1933), Cleistocactus sextonianus (Backeb.) D.R.Hunt (2003), Echinopsis sextoniana (Backeb.) Mayta (2015).
