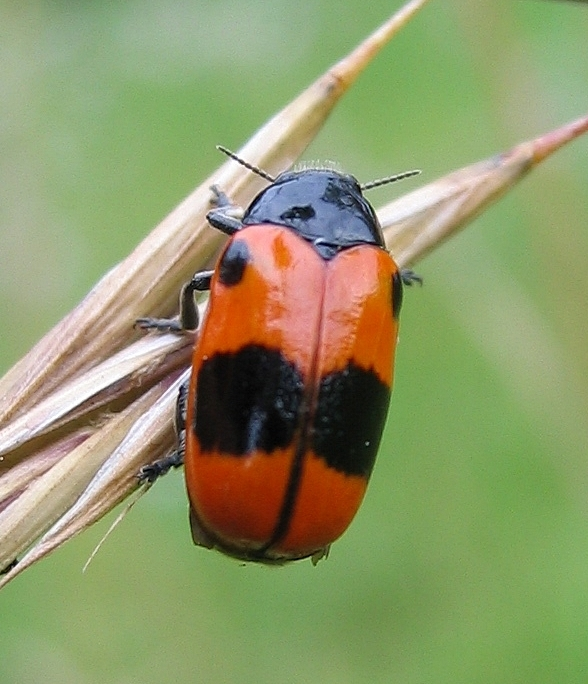
- Clytra laeviuscula

Scientific classification
- Kingdom: Animalia
- Phylum: Arthropoda
- Clade: Pancrustacea
- Class: Insecta
- Order: Coleoptera
- Suborder: Polyphaga
- Infraorder: Cucujiformia
- Family: Chrysomelidae
- Subfamily: Cryptocephalinae
- Tribe: Clytrini; Lacordaire, 1848

Genera
- Many, see text

Synonyms
- Clytrinae

= Clytrini =

Tribe of beetles

The Clytrini are a tribe within the leaf beetle subfamily Cryptocephalinae, though historically they were often treated as a distinct subfamily, Clytrinae. As the other Cryptocephalinae, they belong to the group of case-bearing leaf beetles known as Camptosomata.

Clytrini are known for their myrmecophily.

== Selected genera and species ==
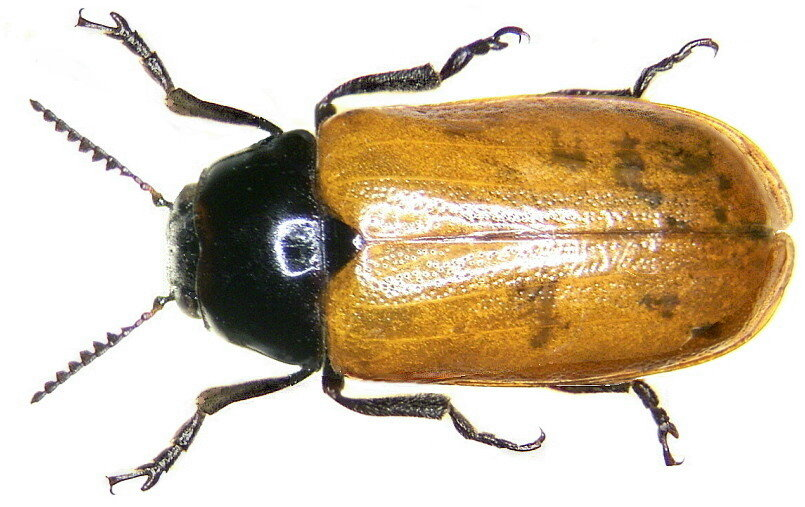
Tituboea illigeri

- Anomoea Agassiz, 1846
  - Anomoea flavokansiensis Moldenke, 1970
  - Anomoea laticlavia Forster, 1771
  - Anomoea nitidicollis Schaeffer, 1919
  - Anomoea rufifrons Lacordaire, 1848
- Babia Chevrolat, 1836
  - Babia quadriguttatus Olivier, 1796
  - Babia tetraspilota Leconte, 1858
- Cheilotoma Chevrolat, 1836
- Chilotomina
- Clytra Laicharting, 1781
  - Clytra laeviuscula Ratzeburg, 1837
- Coleorozena Moldenke, 1981
  - Coleorozena alicula Fall, 1927
  - Coleorozena fulvilabris Jacoby, 1888
  - Coleorozena lecontii Crotch, 1873
  - Coleorozena longicollis Jacoby, 1888
  - Coleorozena pilatei Lacordaire, 1848
  - Coleorozena subnigra Schaeffer, 1905
  - Coleorozena vittata Leconte, 1858
- Coleothorpa Moldenke, 1981
  - Coleothorpa aenescens Crotch, 1873
  - Coleothorpa axillaris Leconte, 1868
  - Coleothorpa dominicana Fabricius, 1801
  - Coleothorpa mucorea Leconte, 1858
  - Coleothorpa seminuda Horn, 1892
  - Coleothorpa vittigera Leconte, 1861
- Coptocephala Chevrolat, 1836
- Coscinoptera Lacordaire, 1848
  - Coscinoptera aeneipennis Leconte, 1858
  - Coscinoptera panochensis Gilbert, 1981
- Labidostomis Chevrolat, 1836
- Lachnaia Chevrolat, 1836
- Macrolenes
- Megalostomis Chevrolat, 1836
  - Megalostomis dimidiata Lacordaire, 1848
  - Megalostomis pyropyga Lacordaire, 1848
  - Megalostomis subfasciata Leconte, 1868
- Melitonoma
- Otiocephala
- Otiothraea
- Saxinis Lacordaire, 1848
  - Saxinis apicalis Leconte, 1884
  - Saxinis deserticola Moldenke, 1970
  - Saxinis hornii Fall, 1909
  - Saxinis knausii Schaeffer, 1906
  - Saxinis omogera Lacordaire, 1848
  - Saxinis saucia Leconte, 1857
  - Saxinis sierramadrensis Moldenke, 1970
  - Saxinis sinuate Schaeffer, 1906
  - Saxinis sonorensis Jacoby, 1889
  - Saxinis subpubescens Schaeffer, 1906
- Smaragdina Chevrolat, 1836
  - Smaragdina militaris Leconte, 1858
- Tituboea
- Urodera Lacordaire, 1848
  - Urodera crucifera Lacordaire, 1848
  - Urodera dilaticollis Jacoby, 1889
