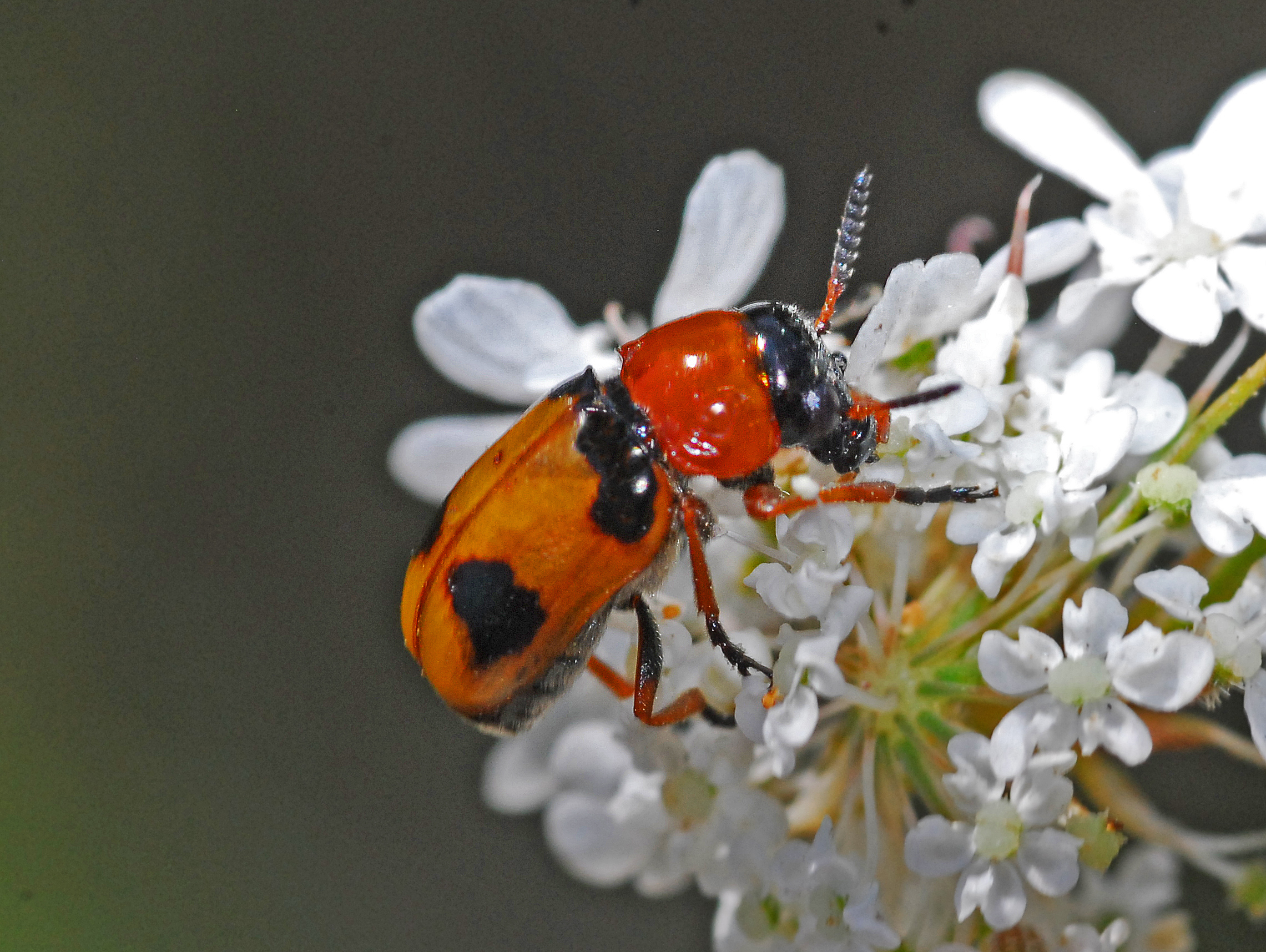
- Male of Coptocephala unifasciata

Scientific classification
- Kingdom: Animalia
- Phylum: Arthropoda
- Clade: Pancrustacea
- Class: Insecta
- Order: Coleoptera
- Suborder: Polyphaga
- Infraorder: Cucujiformia
- Family: Chrysomelidae
- Subfamily: Cryptocephalinae
- Tribe: Clytrini
- Genus: Coptocephala
- Species: C. unifasciata

Binomial name
- Coptocephala unifasciata (Scopoli, 1763)

Synonyms
- Buprestis unifasciata Scopoli, 1763; Coptocephala intermedia Reineck, 1908; Coptocephala femoralis Küster, 1845

= Coptocephala unifasciata =

Species of beetle

Coptocephala unifasciata is a species of leaf beetle belonging to the family Chrysomelidae, subfamily Cryptocephalinae.

== Subspecies ==
Subspecies include:

- Coptocephala unifasciata australis Medvedev, 1965
- Coptocephala unifasciata deserta Medvedev, 1965
- Coptocephala unifasciata destinoi Fairmaire, 1884
- Coptocephala unifasciata unifasciata (Scopoli, 1763)

== Distribution ==
This species is present in the Palearctic Realm. It occurs in large parts of Europe. However, it is absent in the Netherlands, the British Isles and Fennoscandinavia. To the east it occurs over Asia Minor, the Caucasus, Central Asia, Western Siberia to Mongolia.

== Description ==
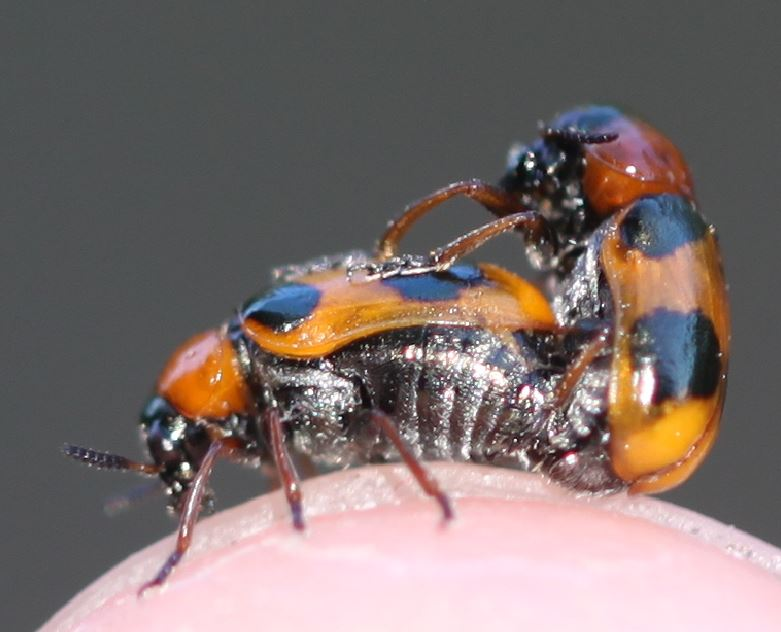
Mating couple

Coptocephala unifasciata can reach a length of 4–7 mm (0.16–0.28 in). The pronotum is red in males, yellow-orange in females. The head is black in male, with a red upper lip. The head is yellow-orange in females. The elytra are yellow-orange and have two black cross bars, which are usually interrupted at the seam and do not reach the side edge. The antennae are yellow-otange at the base, otherwise black. The base of the femora is black, otherwise the legs are yellow-orange.

== Biology ==
The adult beetles fly from April to October. Host plants of the larvae are various umbellifers (Apiaceae) such as wild carrot (Daucus carota), parsnip (Pastinaca sativa), Peucedanum oreoselinum, Echinophora spinosa or representatives of the genus Ferulago. The adult beetles can also be found on the flowers of the host and forage plants.

== Bibliography ==
- This article has been expanded using, inter alia, material based on a translation of an article from the Deutsch Wikipedia, by the same name.
- Jiři Zahradnik, Irmgard Jung, Dieter Jung et al.: Käfer Mittel- und Nordwesteuropas, Parey Berlin 1985, ISBN 3-490-27118-1, Seite 281. (in German)
- Harde, Severa: Der Kosmos Käferführer, Die mitteleuropäischen Käfer, Franckh-Kosmos Verlags-GmbH & Co, Stuttgart 2000, ISBN 3-440-06959-1, Seite 288. (in German)
- K.H. Mohr: 88. Familie Chrysomelidae. in Heinz Freude, Karl Wilhelm Harde, Gustav Adolf Lohse (Herausgeber): Die Käfer Mitteleuropas. Band 9. Cerambycidae Chrysomelidae. Goecke & Evers Verlag, Krefeld 1966, Seite 121. (in German)
