= Coleorozena =

Scientific classification
- Kingdom: Animalia
- Phylum: Arthropoda
- Clade: Pancrustacea
- Class: Insecta
- Order: Coleoptera
- Suborder: Polyphaga
- Infraorder: Cucujiformia
- Family: Chrysomelidae
- Subfamily: Cryptocephalinae
- Tribe: Clytrini
- Genus: Coleorozena; Moldenke, 1970

Genus of beetles

Coleorozena is a genus of case-bearing leaf beetles in the family Chrysomelidae. The group is largely composed of species that were originally placed in the genus Coscinoptera; some authorities have suggested placing these species back into Coscinoptera but the most recent revisions prefer to retain it as a separate genus.

== Selected species ==
- Coleorozena alicula (Fall, 1927)
- Coleorozena fulvilabris (Jacoby, 1888)
- Coleorozena lecontii (Crotch, 1873)
- Coleorozena longicollis (Jacoby, 1888)
- Coleorozena pilatei (Lacordaire, 1848)
- Coleorozena subnigra (Schaeffer, 1905)
- Coleorozena vittata (J. L. LeConte, 1858)
