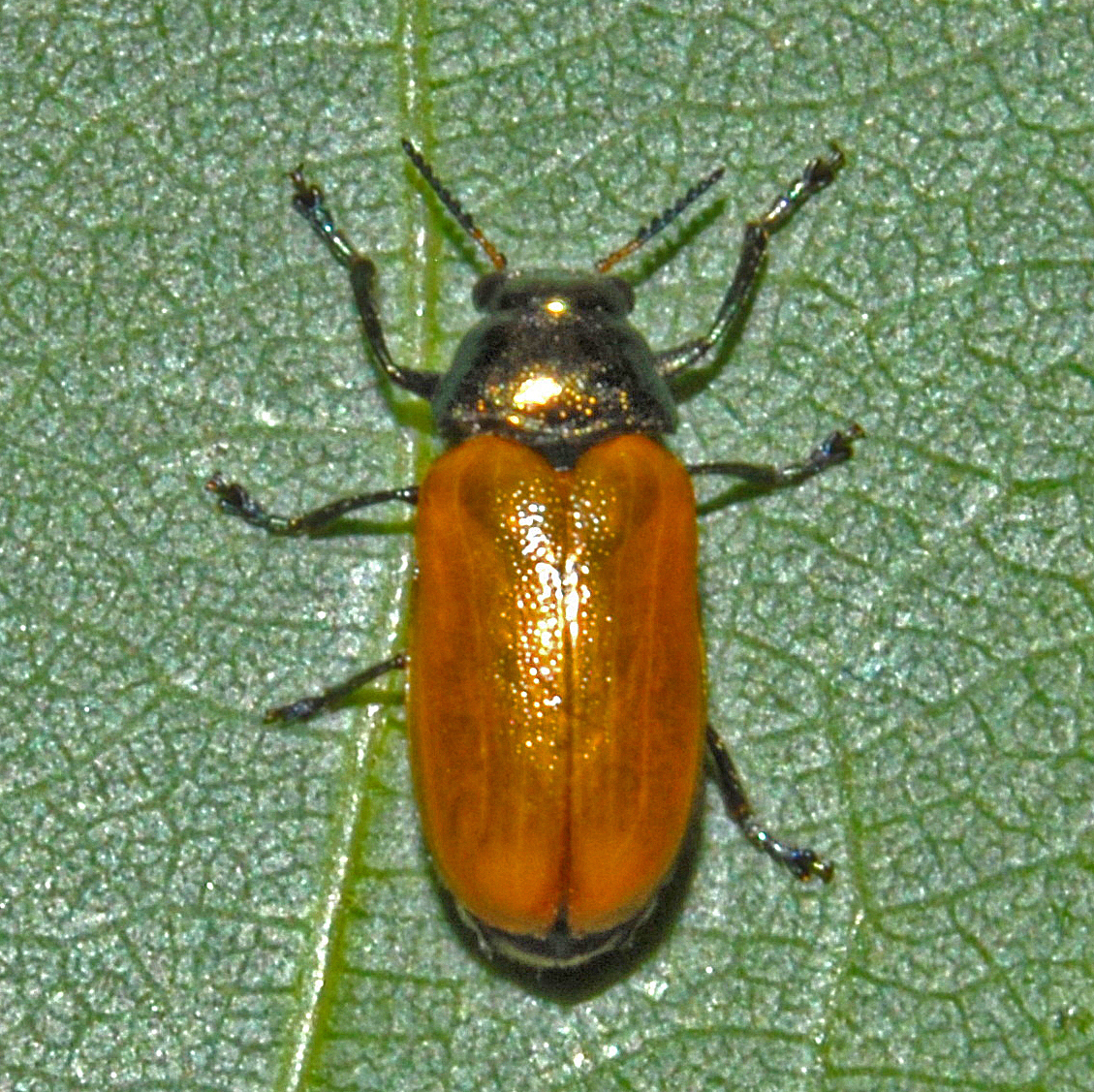
- Labidostomis cyanicornis. Dorsal view

Scientific classification
- Kingdom: Animalia
- Phylum: Arthropoda
- Clade: Pancrustacea
- Class: Insecta
- Order: Coleoptera
- Suborder: Polyphaga
- Infraorder: Cucujiformia
- Family: Chrysomelidae
- Subfamily: Cryptocephalinae
- Tribe: Clytrini
- Genus: Labidostomis
- Species: L. cyanicornis

Binomial name
- Labidostomis cyanicornis (Germar, 1817)

Synonyms
- Clytra cyanicornis Germar, 1822

= Labidostomis cyanicornis =

Species of beetle

Labidostomis cyanicornis is a species of short-horned leaf beetles belonging to the family Chrysomelidae, subfamily Cryptocephalinae, tribe Clytrini.

== Distribution ==
This species can be found in the southern part of Europe, Romania, Ukraine, the Volga basin, and in the eastern Palearctic realm.

== Description ==
Labidostomis cyanicornis can reach a body length of 6.6–8.5 millimetres (0.26–0.33 in). Pronotum is strongly punctate, with rather short hairs or it is almost hairless, while the abdomen is rather hairy. Antennae are serrated from the 5th article. Labrum is yellowish. The head and pronotum are black with distinct greenish metallic reflex, while the elytra are pale orange-brown. Also legs and underside are greenish-black.

== Biology ==
Adults can be found in May–June feeding on Salix alba, Salix cinerea (Salicaceae) and Populus species. Females lay 10–20 eggs in each spawn and seal them in an eggs case consisting of pure secretion.
