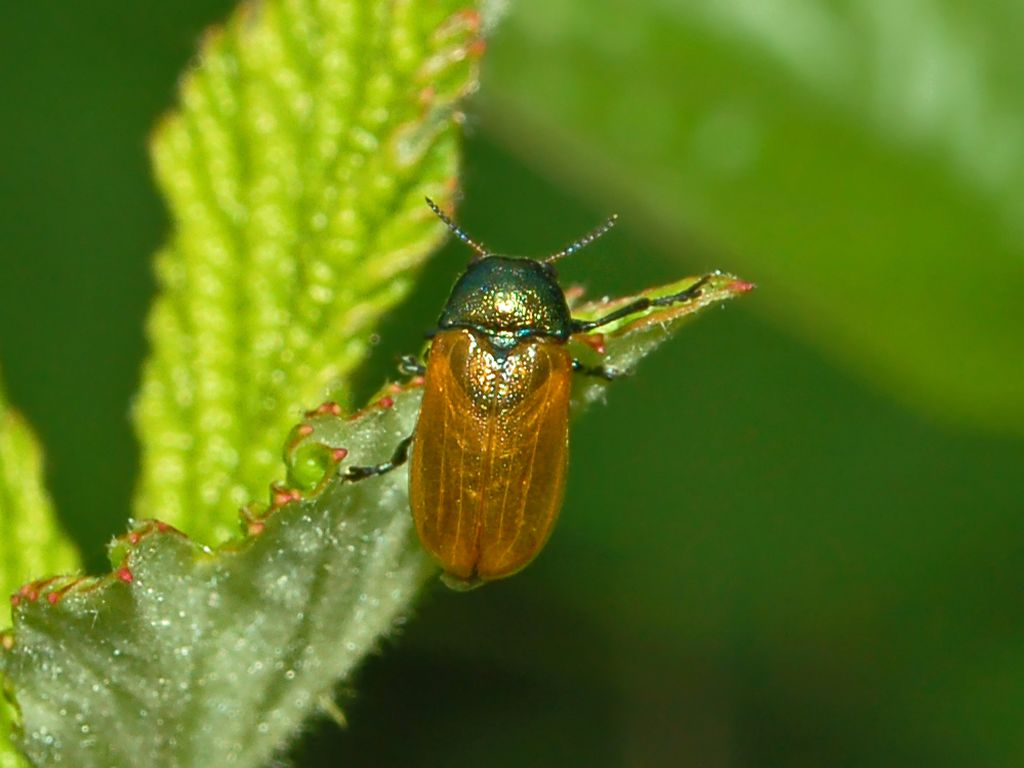
- Labidostomis longimana. Dorsal view
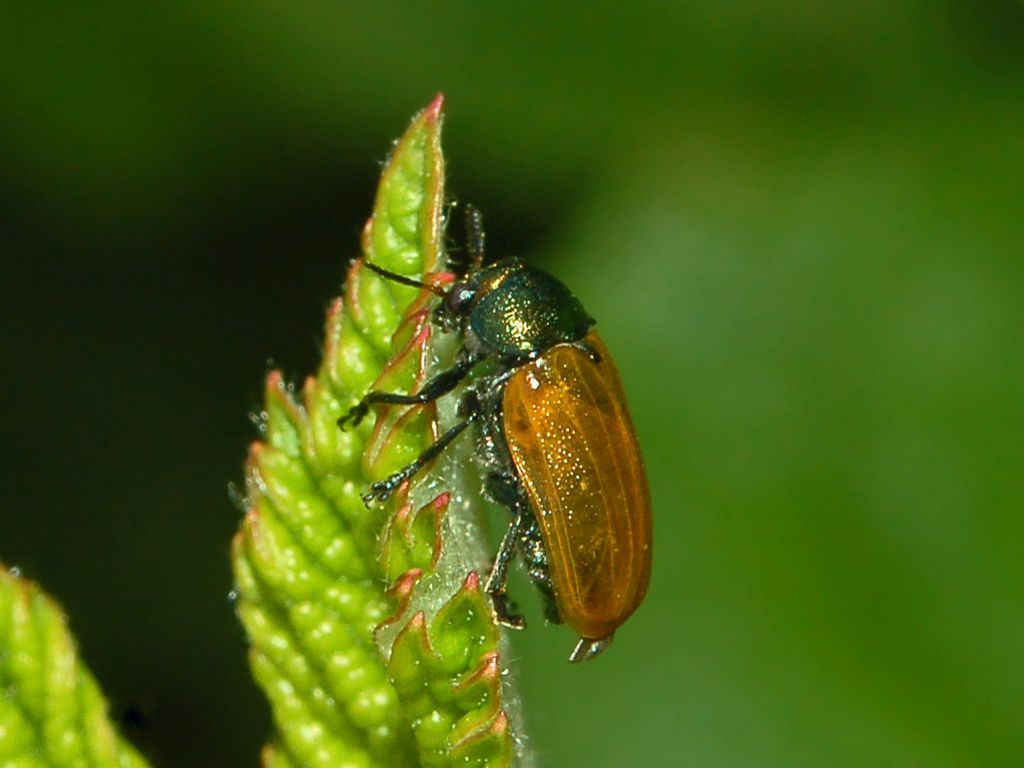
- Side view

Scientific classification
- Kingdom: Animalia
- Phylum: Arthropoda
- Clade: Pancrustacea
- Class: Insecta
- Order: Coleoptera
- Suborder: Polyphaga
- Infraorder: Cucujiformia
- Family: Chrysomelidae
- Subfamily: Cryptocephalinae
- Tribe: Clytrini
- Genus: Labidostomis
- Species: L. longimana

Binomial name
- Labidostomis longimana (Linnaeus, 1761)

Synonyms
- Clytra dalmatina (Lacordaire, 1848)

= Labidostomis longimana =

Species of beetle

Labidostomis longimana is a species of short-horned leaf beetles belonging to the family Chrysomelidae, subfamily Cryptocephalinae, tribe Clytrini.

== Distribution ==
This species is found in most of Europe, in the eastern Palearctic realm, and in the Near East.

== Description ==
These beetles are 4–7 mm long, the head and pronotum are black, the elytra are orange-brown.

== Biology ==
The life cycle of these beetles lasts two years. They feed on cereals and several other plants. It is considered a pest of Pistachio (Pistacia vera).
