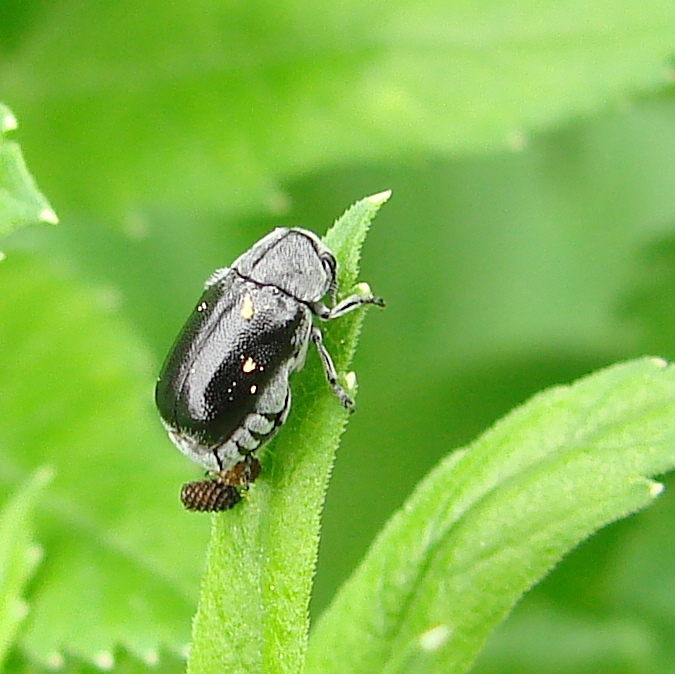
- Coleothorpa dominicana

Scientific classification
- Kingdom: Animalia
- Phylum: Arthropoda
- Clade: Pancrustacea
- Class: Insecta
- Order: Coleoptera
- Suborder: Polyphaga
- Infraorder: Cucujiformia
- Family: Chrysomelidae
- Subfamily: Cryptocephalinae
- Tribe: Clytrini
- Genus: Coleothorpa; Moldenke, 1970

= Coleothorpa =

Genus of beetles

Coleothorpa is a genus of case-bearing leaf beetles in the family Chrysomelidae. The group is largely composed of species that were originally placed in the genus Euryscopa; some authorities have suggested placing these species into the genus Coscinoptera but the most recent revisions prefer to retain it as a separate genus.

== Selected species ==
- Coleothorpa aenescens (Crotch, 1873)
- Coleothorpa axillaris (J. L. LeConte, 1868)
- Coleothorpa dominicana (Fabricius, 1801)
- Coleothorpa mucorea (J. L. LeConte, 1858)
- Coleothorpa panochensis (Gilbert, 1981)
- Coleothorpa seminuda (Horn, 1892)
- Coleothorpa vittigera (J. L. LeConte, 1861)
