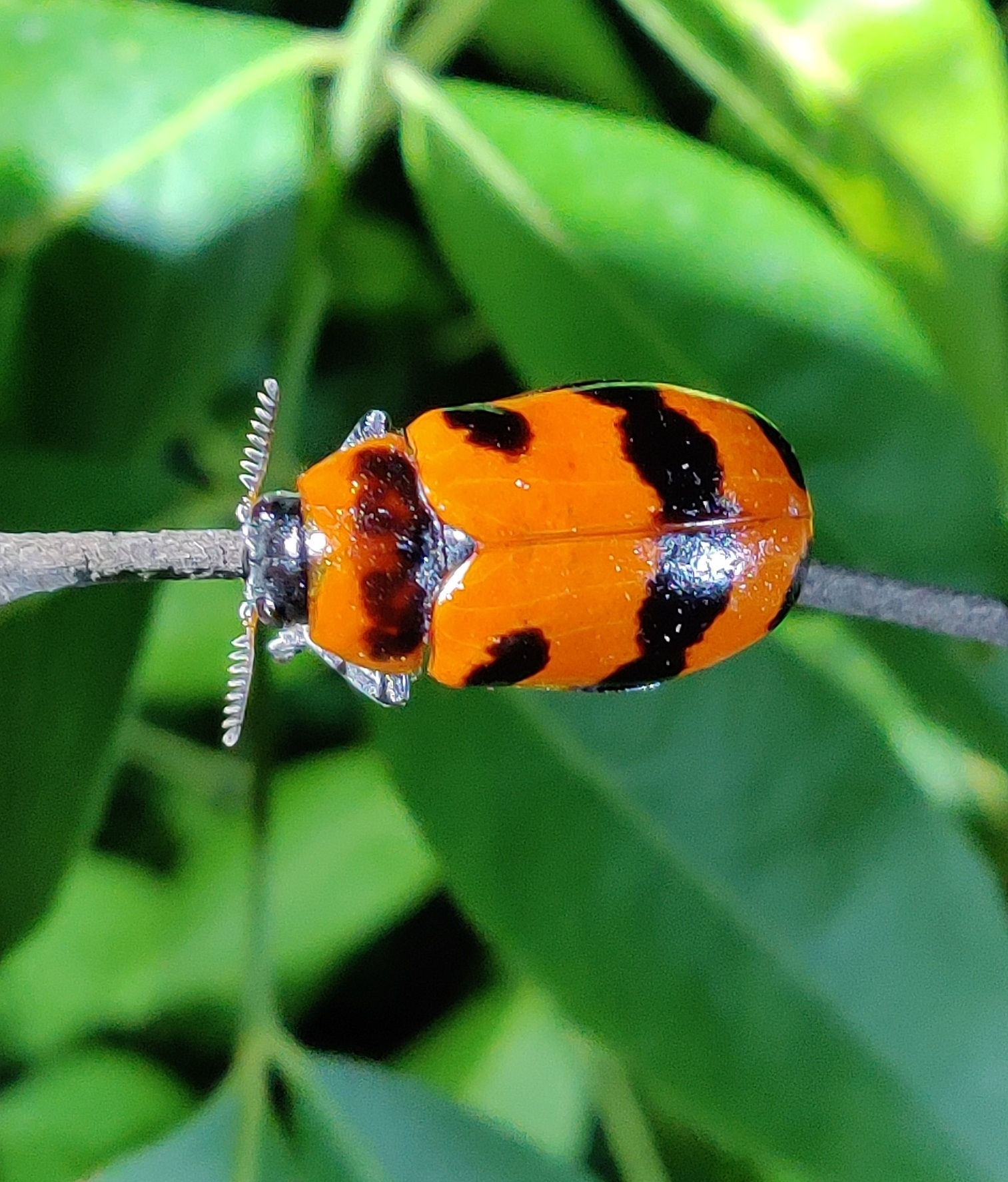
- Cyltrasoma palliatum

Scientific classification
- Kingdom: Animalia
- Phylum: Arthropoda
- Clade: Pancrustacea
- Class: Insecta
- Order: Coleoptera
- Suborder: Polyphaga
- Infraorder: Cucujiformia
- Family: Chrysomelidae
- Subfamily: Cryptocephalinae
- Tribe: Clytrini
- Genus: Clytrasoma; Jacoby, 1908

Type species
- Clythra palliata Fabricius, 1801

Synonyms
- Clytromorpha Achard, 1920

= Clytrasoma =

Genus of leaf beetles

Clytrasoma is a genus of leaf-beetles with several species in tropical Asia and Africa. The antennae are 11 or 12 segmented and are pectinate. Like other Clytrini, the body of the beetles is very cylindrical in females and widened in males and usually are brightly patterned in red or yellow and black. Little is known about their biology but they are thought to be myrmecophiles as a pupa and an adult of C. maschwitzi was found in the nest of a Camponotus ant species. Several other Clytrine beetles have been found in the nests of Camponotus.

Species in the genus include:

- Clytrasoma balyi Monrós, 1953 = distinguendum (Baly, 1865) - Malaysia, Penang
- Clytrasoma bistripunctatum Medvedev, 1999 - Malaysia, Sabah, Sandakan
- Clytrasoma palliatum (Fabricius, 1801) - India, Sri Lanka, Birma, Vietnam, Thailand, Laos, China (South)
- Clytrasoma laysi Medvedev, 2002 - Philippines
- Clytrasoma maschwitzi Schöller, 2007 - Malaysia
- Clytrasoma brivioi Takizawa, 1990 - India
- Clytrasoma celebensis Medvedev, 1999 - Indonesia, Sulawesi, Toli Toli
- Clytrasoma cconformis (Lacordaire, 1848) - Kashmir, Punjab, Bengal = var. octomaculatum Pic, 1932 - Himalaya
- Clytrasoma laosensis Pic, 1928 - Laos
- Clytrasoma mediofasciatum Pic, 1934 - Philippines
- Clytrasoma mohamedsaidi Medvedev, 1999 - East Malaysia, Sabah, Crocker Range
- Clytrasoma nathani Pic, 1943 - India
- Clytrasoma tonkineum Pic, 1934 - Vietnam (North and South)

Subgenus Clytromorpha Achard, 1920 - Afrotropical

- Clytrasoma aequinoctialis (Lacordaire, 1848) - Guinea
- Clytrasoma annulipes Pic, 1952 - Benin
- Clytrasoma connectens (Jacoby, 1895) - Togo
- Clytrasoma decumanum (Illiger, 1800) - Gambia, Guinea, Sierra Leone, Senegal, Republic Congo
- Clytrasoma militaris (Jacoby, 1895) - Togo, Benin
