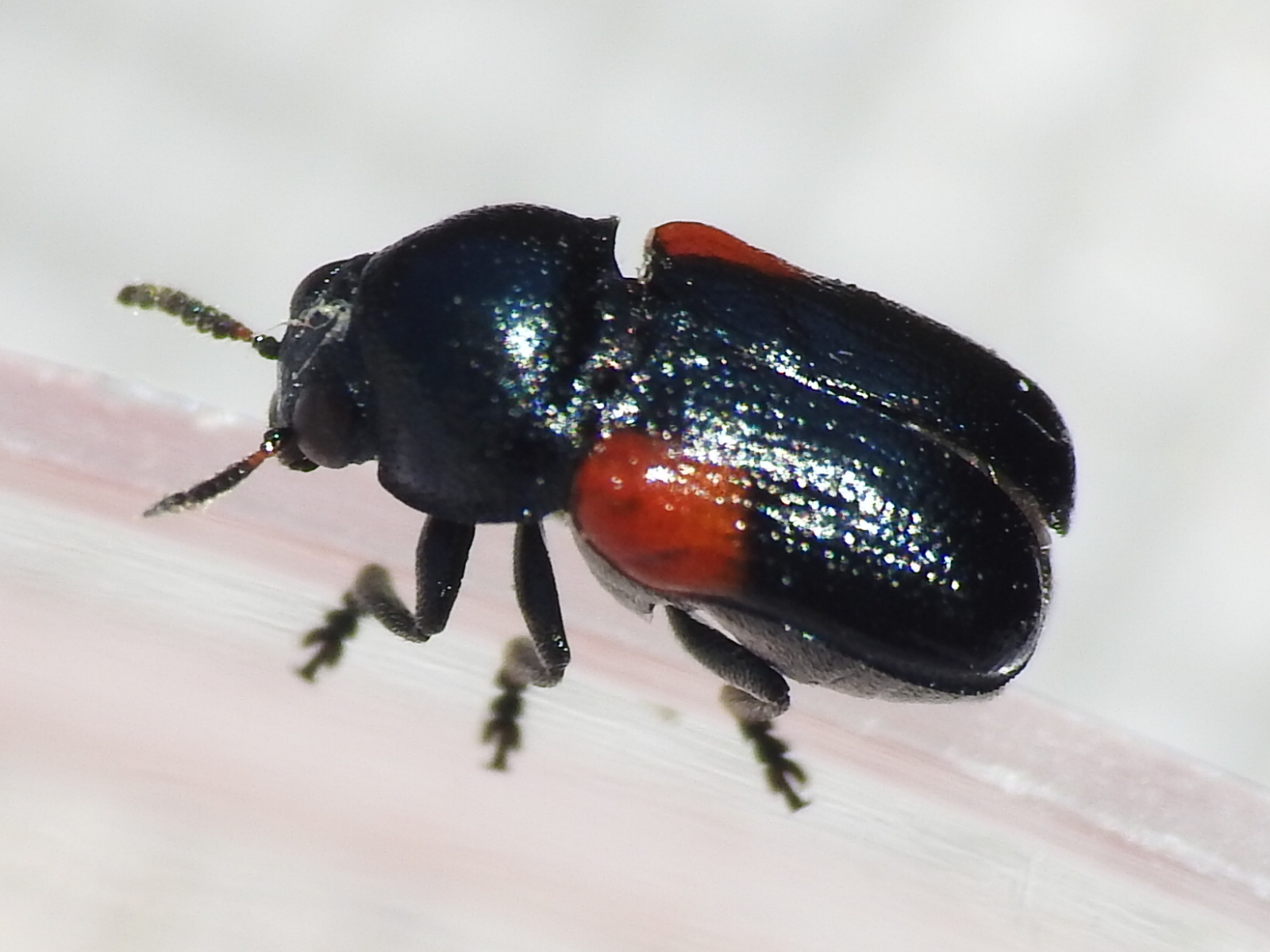
- Saxinis omogera, Texas

Scientific classification
- Kingdom: Animalia
- Phylum: Arthropoda
- Clade: Pancrustacea
- Class: Insecta
- Order: Coleoptera
- Suborder: Polyphaga
- Infraorder: Cucujiformia
- Family: Chrysomelidae
- (unranked): Camptosomata
- Subfamily: Cryptocephalinae
- Tribe: Clytrini
- Genus: Saxinis
- Species: S. omogera

Binomial name
- Saxinis omogera Lacordaire, 1848

= Saxinis omogera =

Species of beetles

Saxinis omogera is a species of leaf beetle in the family Chrysomelidae, found in North America.

== Subspecies ==
These three subspecies belong to the species Saxinis omogera:

- Saxinis omogera chiricahuae Moldenke, 1970
- Saxinis omogera kansana Moldenke, 1970
- Saxinis omogera omogera Lacordaire, 1848
