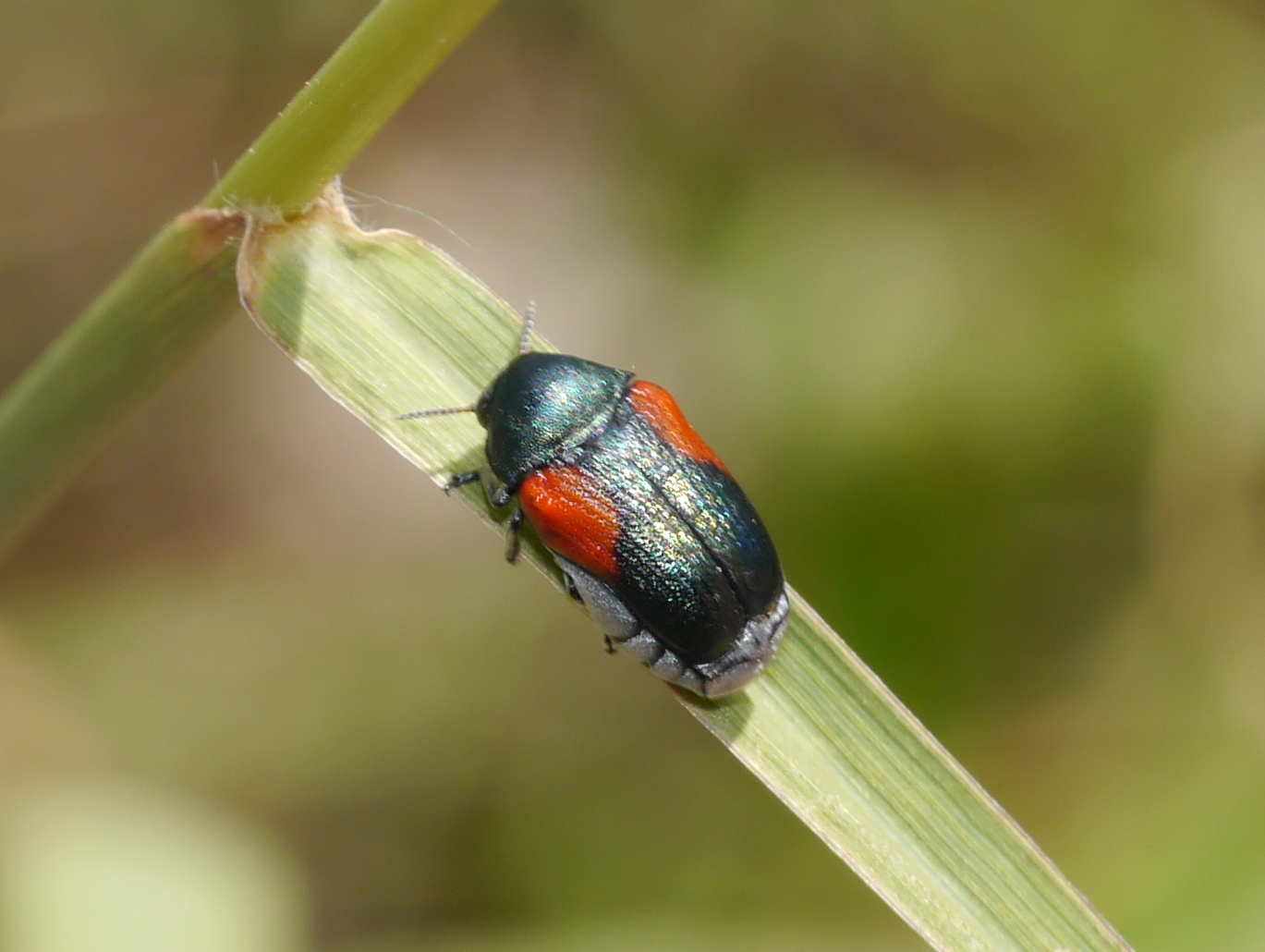
- Saxinis sonorensis, Arizona

Scientific classification
- Kingdom: Animalia
- Phylum: Arthropoda
- Clade: Pancrustacea
- Class: Insecta
- Order: Coleoptera
- Suborder: Polyphaga
- Infraorder: Cucujiformia
- Family: Chrysomelidae
- (unranked): Camptosomata
- Subfamily: Cryptocephalinae
- Tribe: Clytrini
- Genus: Saxinis
- Species: S. sonorensis

Binomial name
- Saxinis sonorensis Jacoby, 1889

= Saxinis sonorensis =

Species of beetles

Saxinis sonorensis is a species of leaf beetle in the family Chrysomelidae, found in Mexico and the southwestern United States.

== Subspecies ==
These two subspecies belong to the species Saxinis sonorensis:

- Saxinis sonorensis scutellaris Schaeffer, 1906
- Saxinis sonorensis sonorensis Jacoby, 1889
