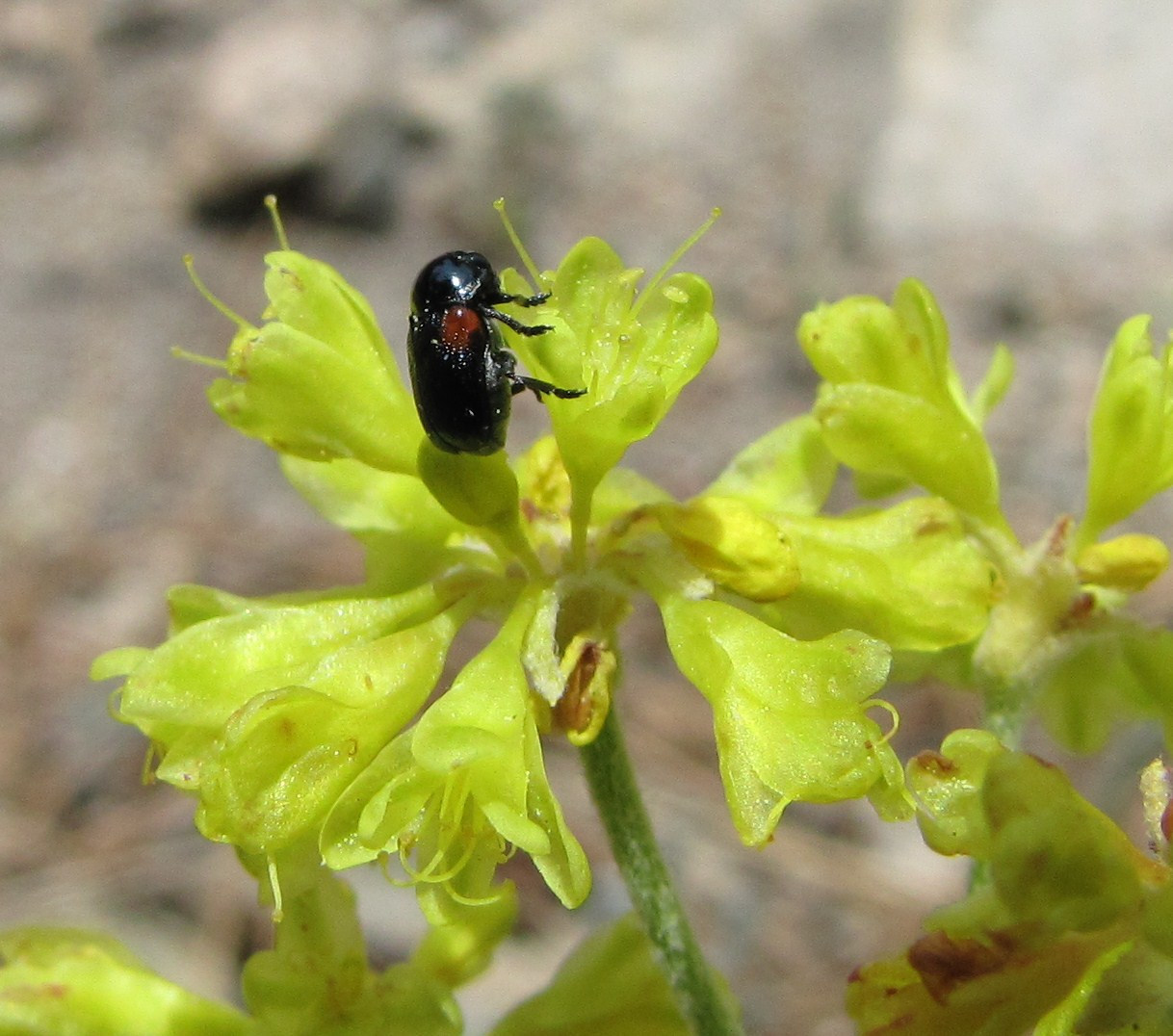
- Saxinis saucia

Scientific classification
- Kingdom: Animalia
- Phylum: Arthropoda
- Clade: Pancrustacea
- Class: Insecta
- Order: Coleoptera
- Suborder: Polyphaga
- Infraorder: Cucujiformia
- Family: Chrysomelidae
- (unranked): Camptosomata
- Subfamily: Cryptocephalinae
- Tribe: Clytrini
- Genus: Saxinis; Lacordaire, 1848

Synonyms
- Boreosaxinis Moldenke, 1981

= Saxinis =

Genus of beetles

Saxinis is a genus of case-bearing leaf beetles in the family Chrysomelidae. There are about 12 described species in Saxinis, found in North, Central, and South America.

== Species ==
These species belong to the genus Saxinis:

- Saxinis apicalis J. L. LeConte, 1884
- Saxinis deserticola Moldenke, 1970
- Saxinis fragilis Lacordaire, 1848
- Saxinis hornii Fall, 1909
- Saxinis knausii Schaeffer, 1906
- Saxinis omogera Lacordaire, 1848
- Saxinis regularis Scudder, 1898
- Saxinis saucia J. L. LeConte, 1857
- Saxinis sierramadrensis Moldenke, 1970
- Saxinis sinuata Schaeffer, 1906
- Saxinis sonorensis Jacoby, 1889
- Saxinis subpubescens Schaeffer, 1906
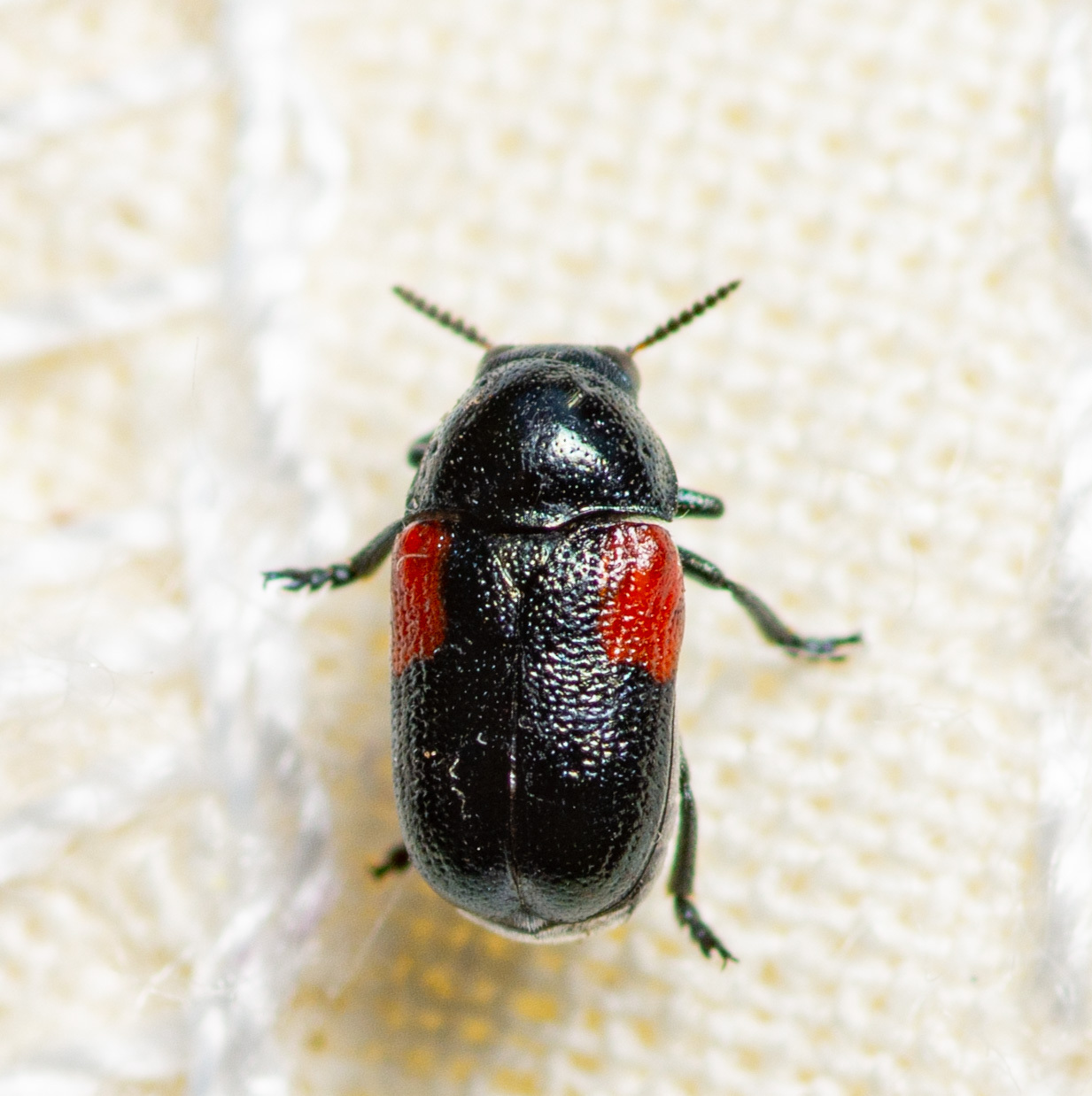
Saxinis sinuata, Texas

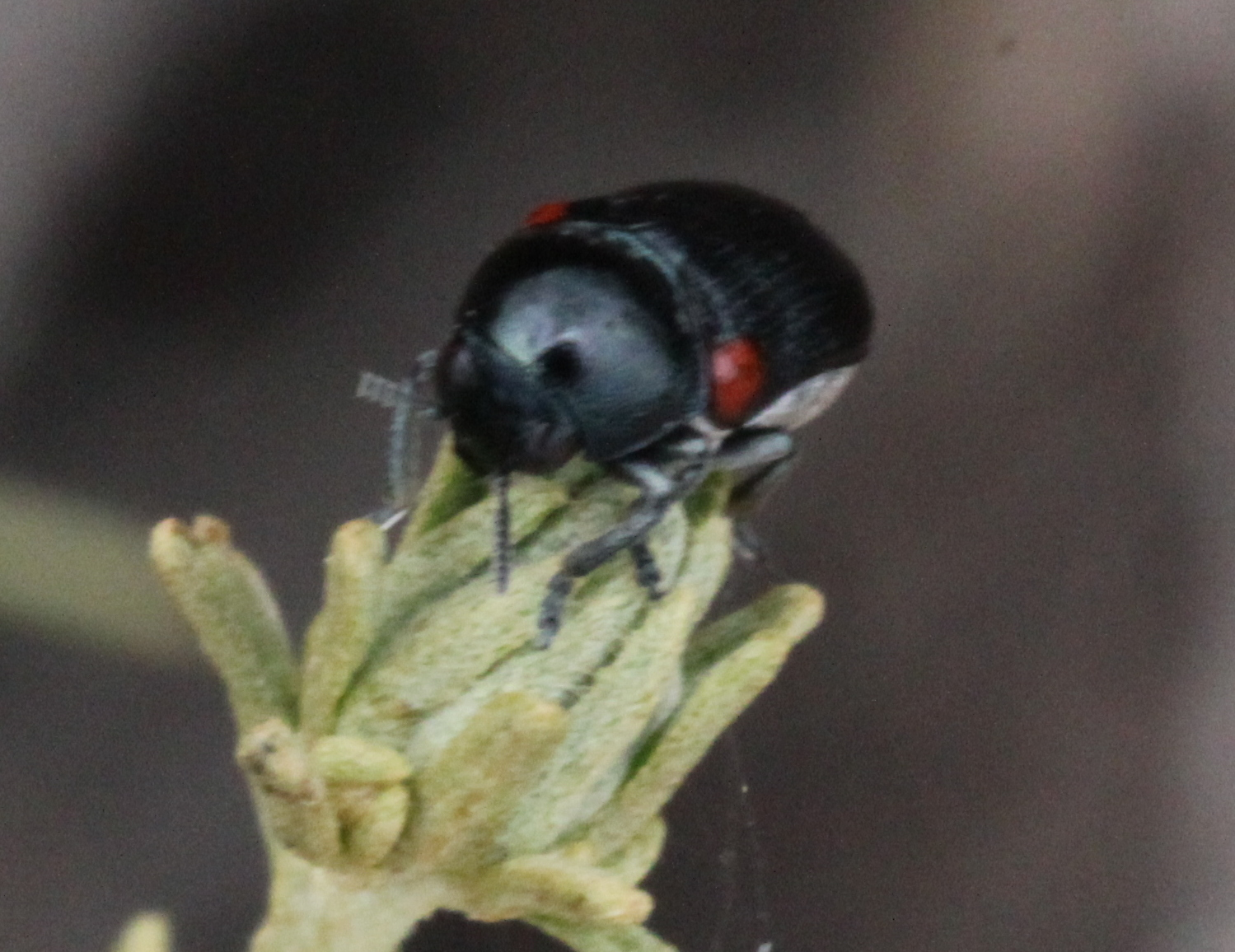
Saxinis deserticola, California

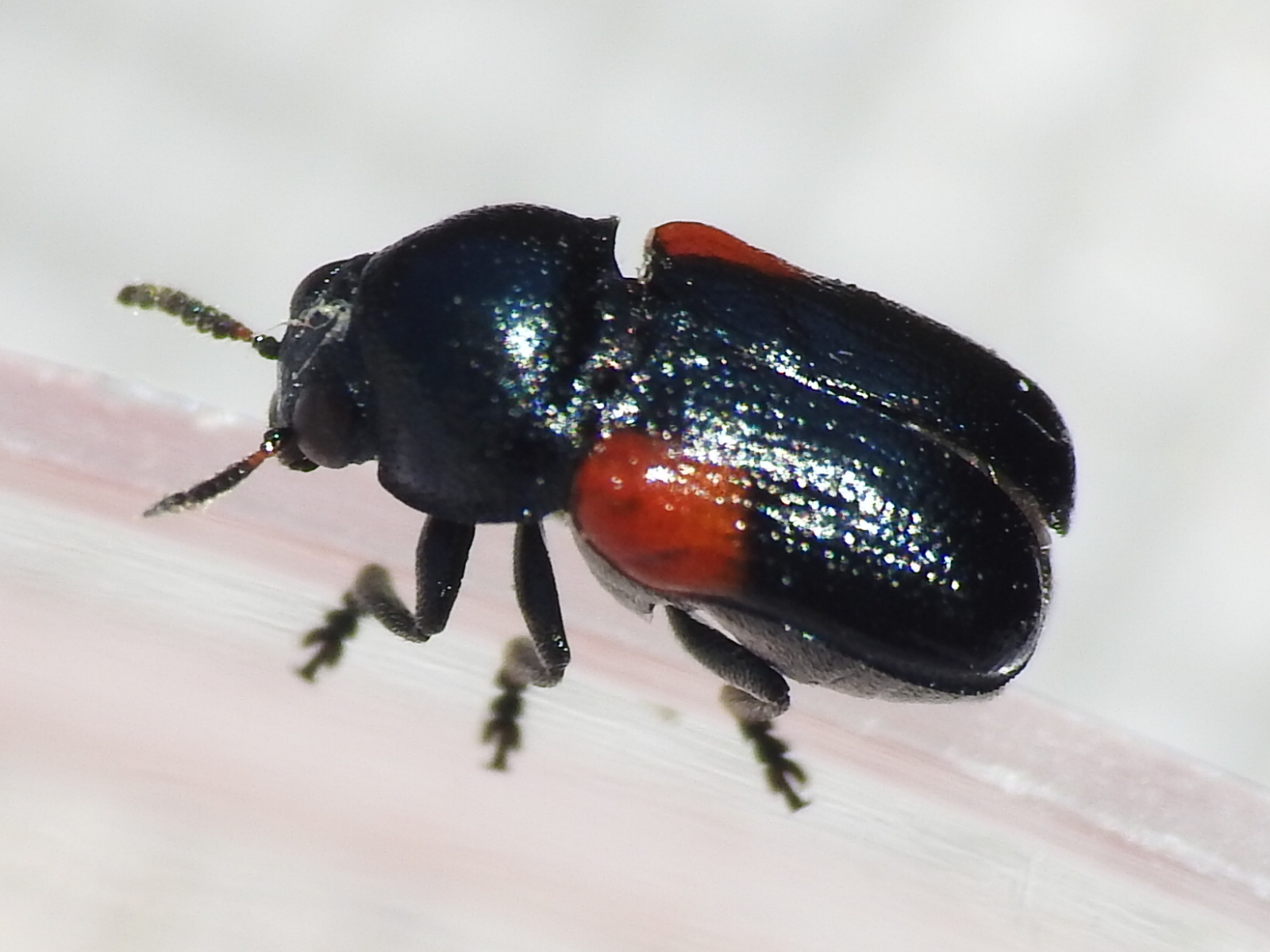
Saxinis omogera, Texas

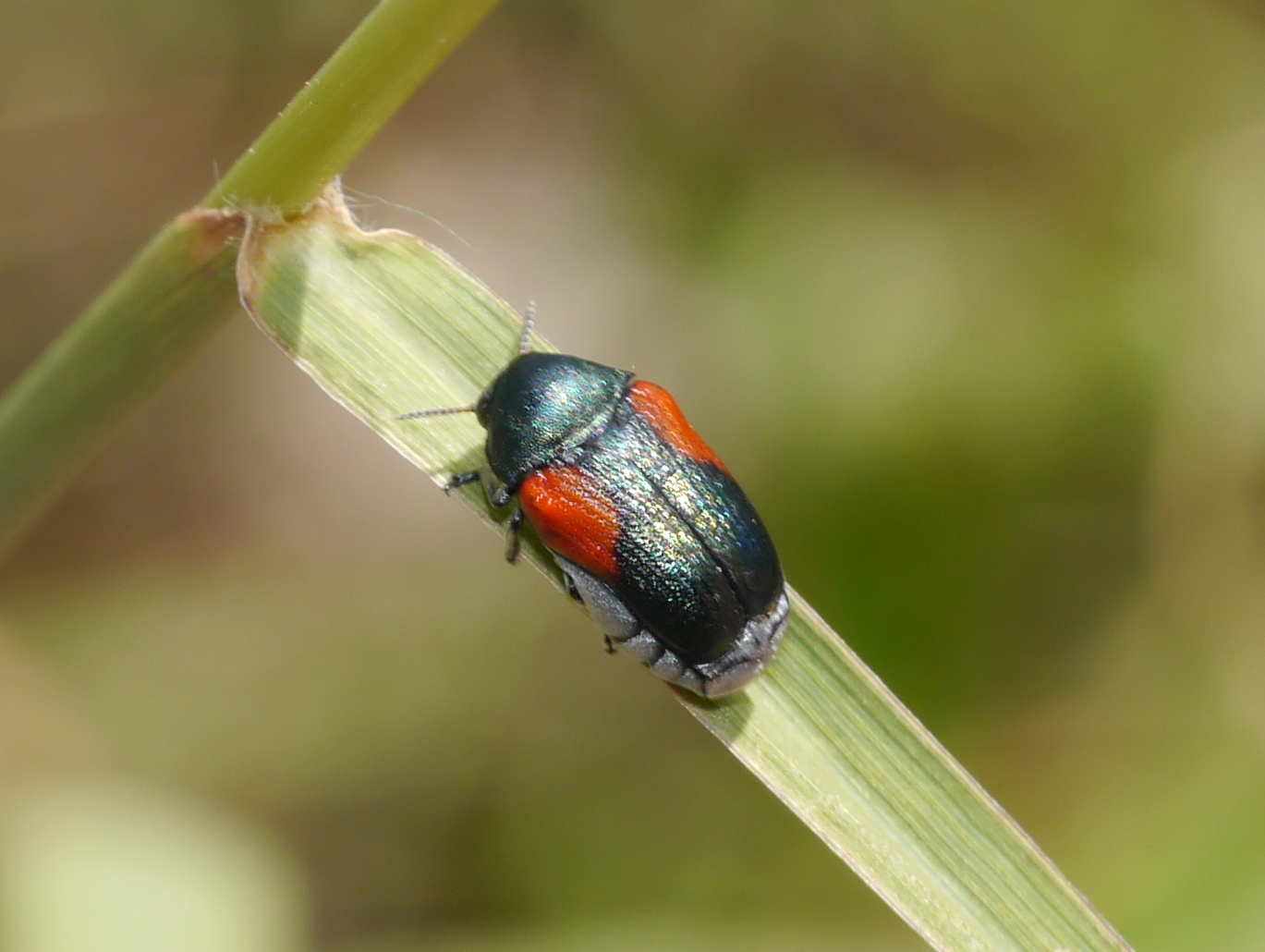
Saxinis sonorensis, Arizona

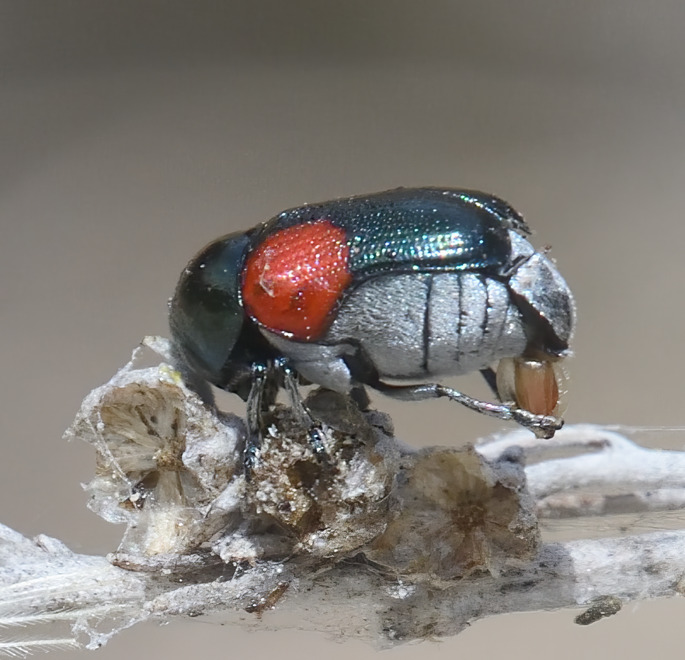
Saxinis saucia, California
