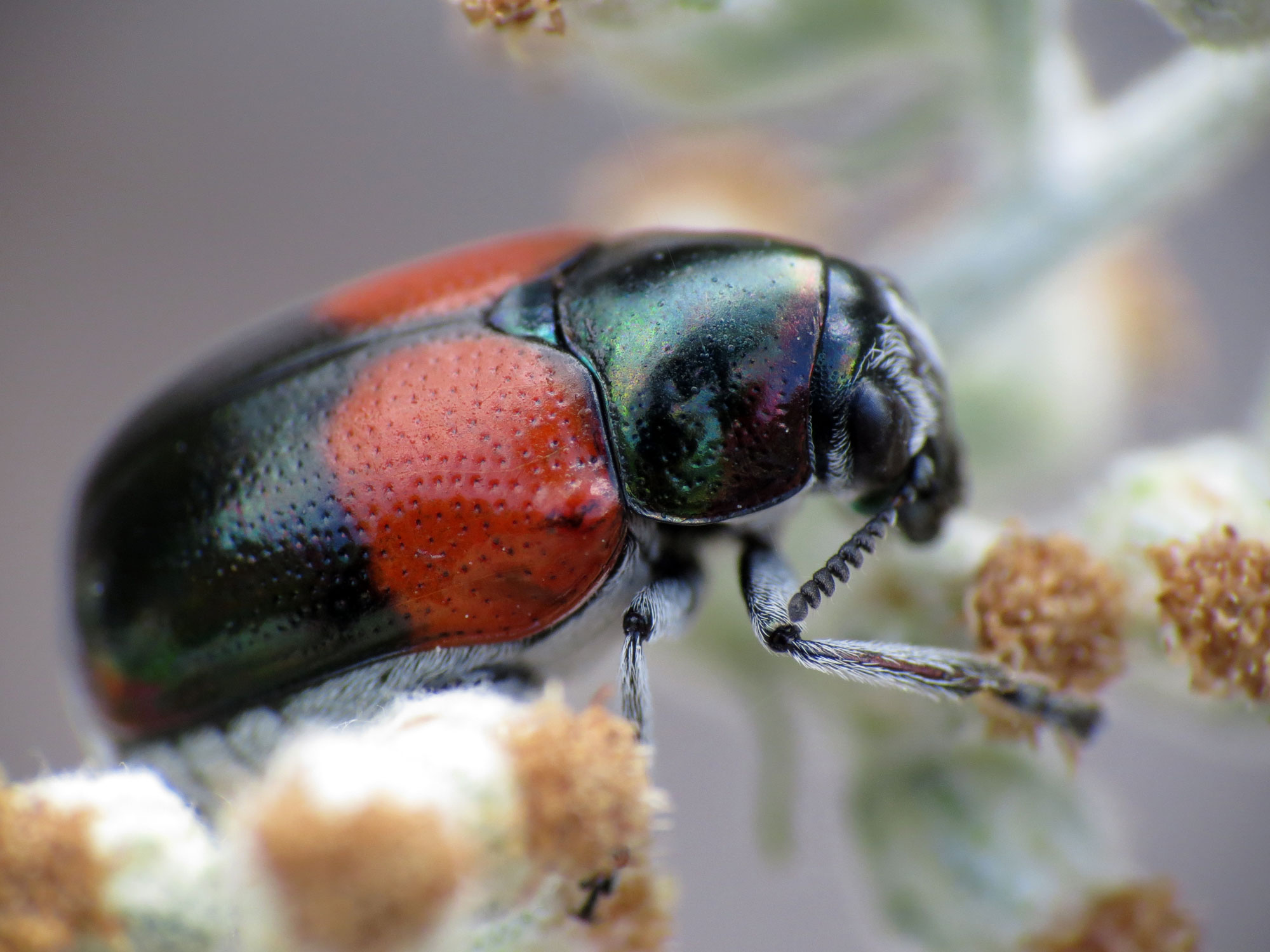
- Megalostomis pyropyga

Scientific classification
- Kingdom: Animalia
- Phylum: Arthropoda
- Clade: Pancrustacea
- Class: Insecta
- Order: Coleoptera
- Suborder: Polyphaga
- Infraorder: Cucujiformia
- Family: Chrysomelidae
- Subfamily: Cryptocephalinae
- Tribe: Clytrini
- Genus: Megalostomis; Chevrolat in Dejean, 1836

= Megalostomis =

Genus of beetles

Megalostomis is a genus of case-bearing leaf beetles in the family Chrysomelidae. There are at least three described species in Megalostomis.

== Species ==
These three species belong to the genus Megalostomis:

- Megalostomis dimidiata Lacordaire, 1848
- Megalostomis pyropyga Lacordaire, 1848
- Megalostomis subfasciata (J. L. LeConte, 1868)
