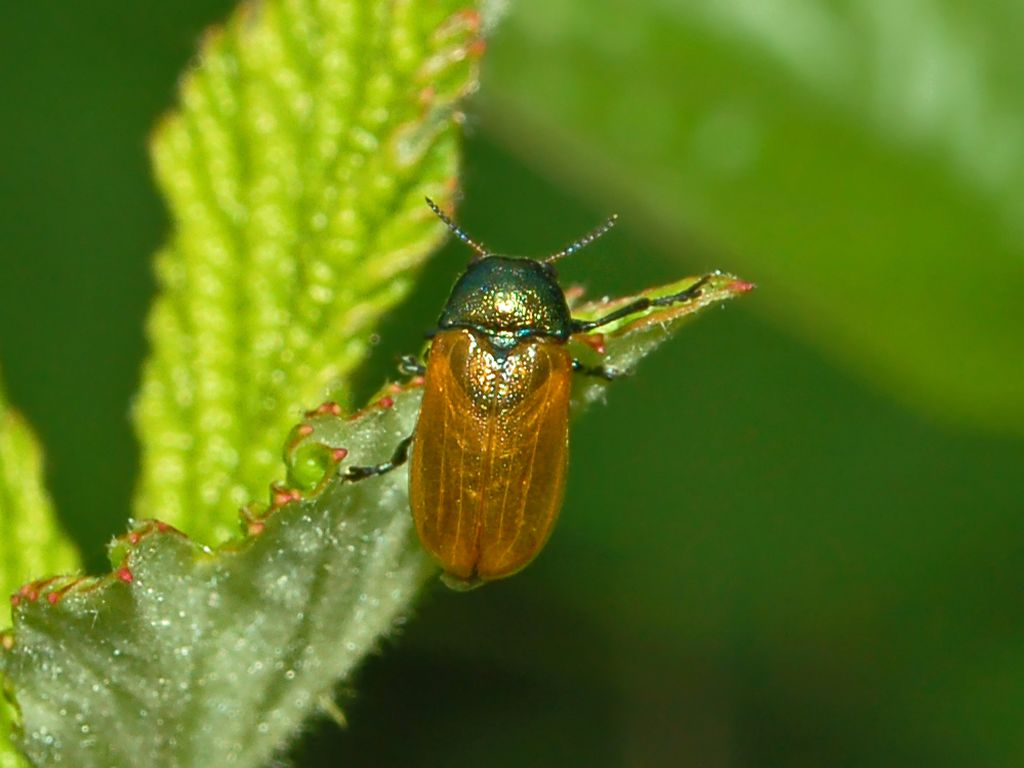
- Labidostomis longimana.

Scientific classification
- Kingdom: Animalia
- Phylum: Arthropoda
- Class: Insecta
- Order: Coleoptera
- Suborder: Polyphaga
- Infraorder: Cucujiformia
- Family: Chrysomelidae
- Subfamily: Cryptocephalinae
- Tribe: Clytrini
- Genus: Labidostomis; Chevrolat in Dejean, 1836

= Labidostomis =

Genus of beetles

Labidostomis is a genus of short-horned leaf beetles belonging to the family Chrysomelidae, subfamily Cryptocephalinae.

== Species ==
Species within this genus include:

- Labidostomis amurensis Heyden, 1884
- Labidostomis asiatica Faldermann, 1837
- Labidostomis axillaris (Lacordaire, 1848)
- Labidostomis balcanica Tomov, 1987
- Labidostomis beckeri Weise, 1881
- Labidostomis bolivari Cobos, 1954
- Labidostomis boreopersica Lopatin, 1997
- Labidostomis centromaculata Gené, 1839
- Labidostomis cheni Lopatin, 1995
- Labidostomis cyanicornis (Germar, 1822)
- Labidostomis damavandensis Rapilly, 1984
- Labidostomis decipiens Faldermann, 1837
- Labidostomis diversifrons Lefèvre, 1872
- Labidostomis funerea Fairmaire, 1891
- Labidostomis ghilianii (Lacordaire, 1848)
- Labidostomis graeca Tomov, 1990
- Labidostomis guerini (Bassi, 1834)
- Labidostomis harazensis Rapilly, 1984
- Labidostomis heinzi (Lopatin, 1993)
- Labidostomis hordei (Fabricius, 1787)
- Labidostomis humeralis (D.H. Schneider, 1792)
- Labidostomis kantneri Warchalowski, 2004
- Labidostomis karamanica Weise, 1900
- Labidostomis laeta Medvedev, 1992
- Labidostomis lepida Lefèvre, 1872
- Labidostomis longimana (Linnaeus, 1760)
- Labidostomis lucida (Germar, 1824)
- Labidostomis lusitanica (Germar, 1824)
- Labidostomis martensi Medvedev, 1983
- Labidostomis mesopotamica Weise, 1900
- Labidostomis metallica Lefèvre, 1872
- Labidostomis nevadensis J. Daniel, 1904
- Labidostomis oertzeni Weise, 1889
- Labidostomis pachysoma L. Medvedev, 1965
- Labidostomis pallidipennis (Gebler, 1830)
- Labidostomis propinqua Faldermann, 1837
- Labidostomis rufa (Waltl, 1838)
- Labidostomis senicula Kraatz, 1872
- Labidostomis shirazica Lopatin, 1979
- Labidostomis sibirica (Germar, 1824)
- Labidostomis sulcicollis (Lacordaire, 1848)
- Labidostomis taxicornis (Fabricius, 1792)
- Labidostomis tridentata (Linnaeus, 1758)
- Labidostomis tymphristica Tomov, 1990
