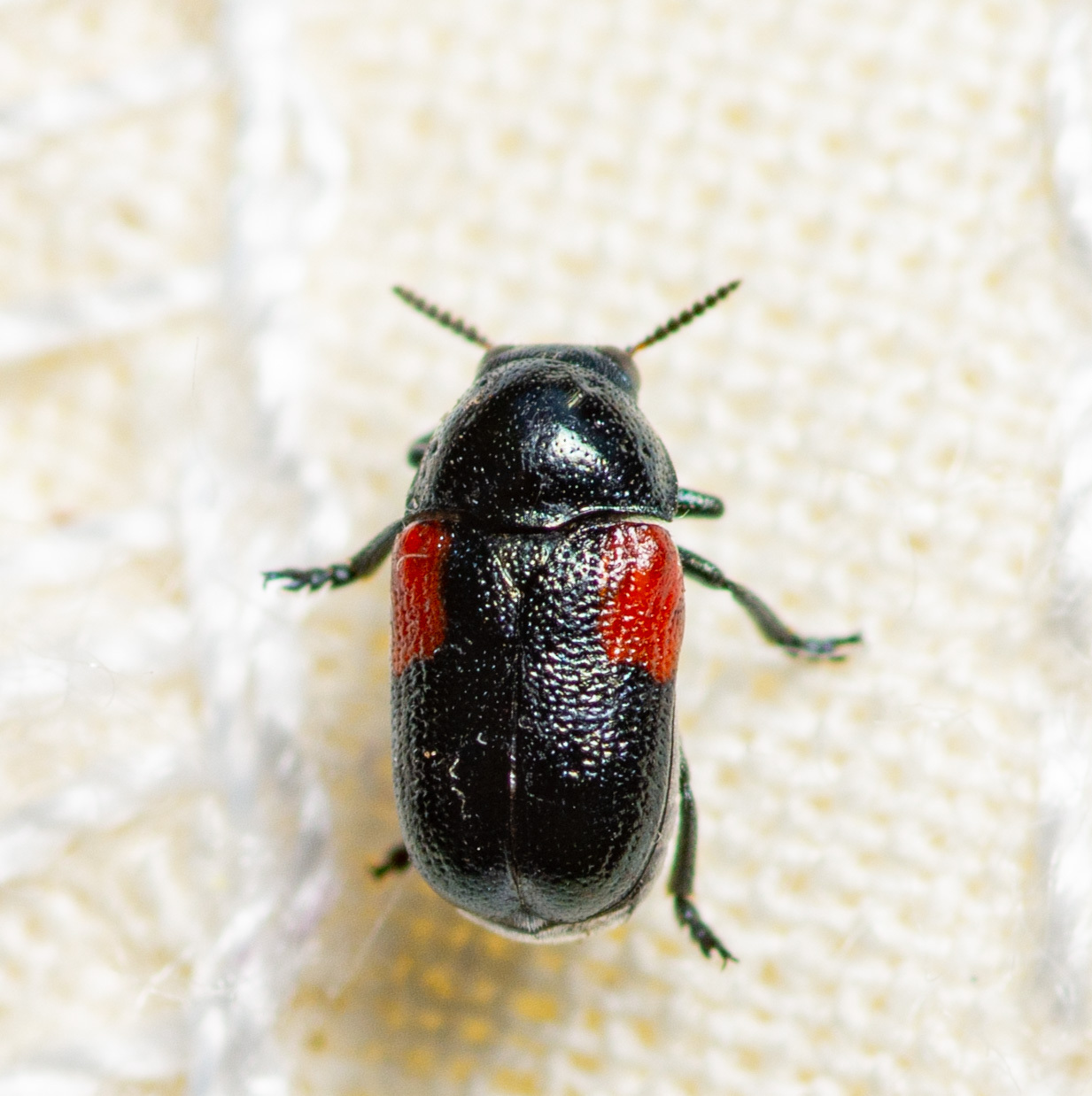
- Saxinis sinuata, Texas

Scientific classification
- Kingdom: Animalia
- Phylum: Arthropoda
- Clade: Pancrustacea
- Class: Insecta
- Order: Coleoptera
- Suborder: Polyphaga
- Infraorder: Cucujiformia
- Family: Chrysomelidae
- Genus: Saxinis
- Species: S. sinuata

Binomial name
- Saxinis sinuata Schaeffer, 1906

= Saxinis sinuata =

Species of beetle

Saxinis sinuata is a species of case-bearing leaf beetle in the family Chrysomelidae. It is found in North America.
