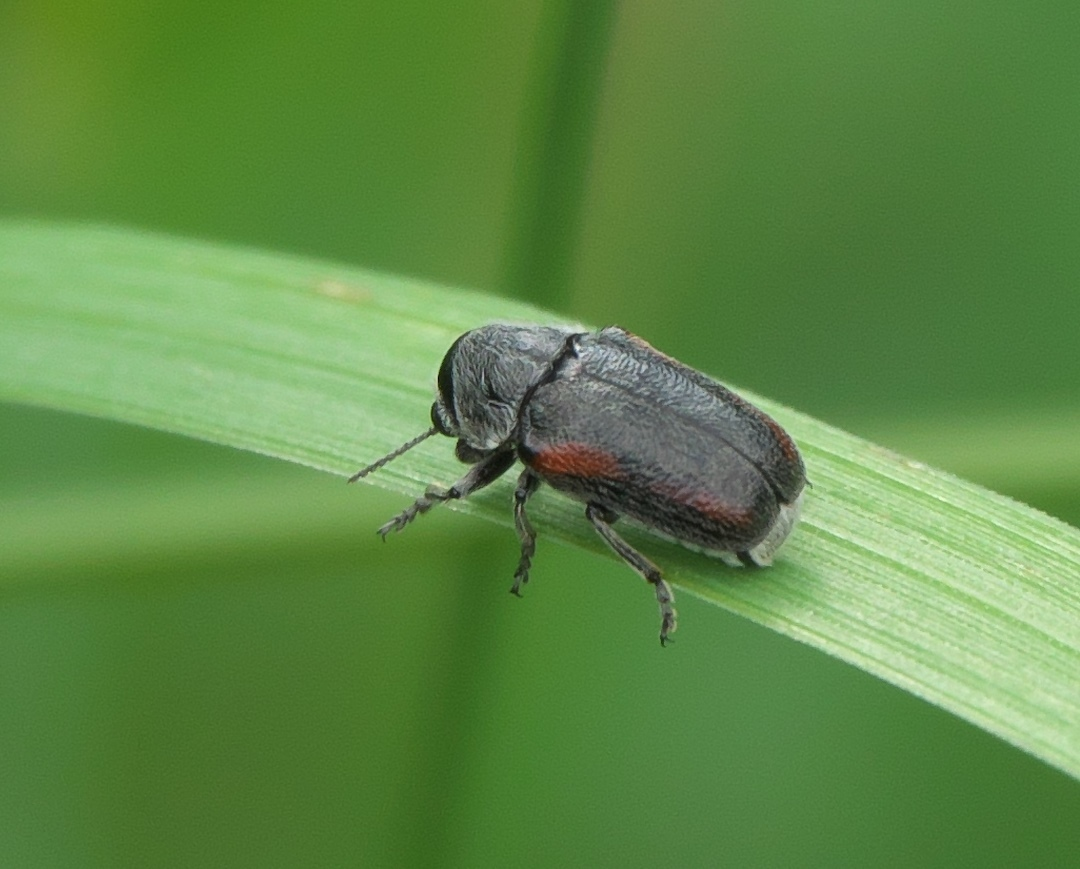
- Coleothorpa vittigera, Colorado

Scientific classification
- Kingdom: Animalia
- Phylum: Arthropoda
- Clade: Pancrustacea
- Class: Insecta
- Order: Coleoptera
- Suborder: Polyphaga
- Infraorder: Cucujiformia
- Family: Chrysomelidae
- Subfamily: Cryptocephalinae
- Tribe: Clytrini
- Genus: Coleothorpa
- Species: C. vittigera

Binomial name
- Coleothorpa vittigera (J. L. LeConte, 1861)

= Coleothorpa vittigera =

Species of beetle

Coleothorpa vittigera is a species of case-bearing leaf beetles in the family Chrysomelidae. It is found in North America.

== Subspecies ==
- C. vittigera arizonensis (Horn, 1892)
- C. vittigera vittigera (J. L. LeConte, 1861)
