= Coleothorpa seminuda =

Scientific classification
- Kingdom: Animalia
- Phylum: Arthropoda
- Clade: Pancrustacea
- Class: Insecta
- Order: Coleoptera
- Suborder: Polyphaga
- Infraorder: Cucujiformia
- Family: Chrysomelidae
- Subfamily: Cryptocephalinae
- Tribe: Clytrini
- Genus: Coleothorpa
- Species: C. seminuda

Binomial name
- Coleothorpa seminuda Horn, 1892

Species of beetle

Coleothorpa seminuda is a species of case bearing leaf beetle in the family Chrysomelidae. It has no subspecies. It is found in North America.
