= Saxinis apicalis =

Scientific classification
- Kingdom: Animalia
- Phylum: Arthropoda
- Clade: Pancrustacea
- Class: Insecta
- Order: Coleoptera
- Suborder: Polyphaga
- Infraorder: Cucujiformia
- Family: Chrysomelidae
- Subfamily: Cryptocephalinae
- Tribe: Clytrini
- Genus: Saxinis
- Species: S. apicalis

Binomial name
- Saxinis apicalis J. L. LeConte, 1884

Species of beetle

Saxinis apicalis is a species of case-bearing leaf beetles in the family Chrysomelidae. It is found in Central America and North America.
