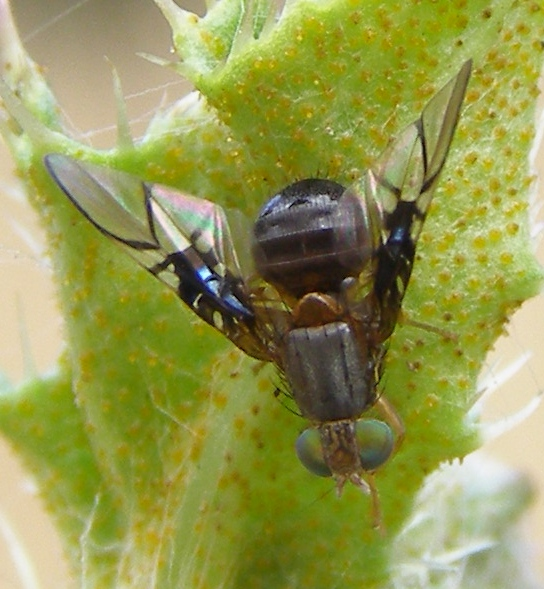
- Anomoia purmunda

Scientific classification
- Kingdom: Animalia
- Phylum: Arthropoda
- Class: Insecta
- Order: Diptera
- Family: Tephritidae
- Subfamily: Trypetinae
- Tribe: Trypetini
- Genus: Anomoia; Walker, 1835

= Anomoia =

Genus of flies

Anomoia is a largely Oriental genus of tephritid or fruit flies in the family Tephritidae. The name is frequently misspelled as Anomoea, though the latter is a beetle genus. The best known non Oriental species is Anomoia purmunda (Harris, [1780]) In this species the length of the distinctively patterned wings is 3.7-5.0 mm. The head and body are partly dull yellow to orange or yellow red, with strong, brown bristles. The face and lunula are yellow. The third segment of the antennae is red brown. Mesonotum with thick, grey pruinosity; mesophragm with two large brown spots. The scutellum is tomentose grey. The legs are yellow. The wings are rufous at the base and with brown spots and bands. The abdomen is reddish-brown, with grey pruinosity at the posterior edge.

The larva of Aomoia purmunda feeds in the fruits of Crataegus monogyna and other Crataegus, but also on the fruit of Rosaceae and Berberidaceae.
