= Urodera =

Scientific classification
- Kingdom: Animalia
- Phylum: Arthropoda
- Clade: Pancrustacea
- Class: Insecta
- Order: Coleoptera
- Suborder: Polyphaga
- Infraorder: Cucujiformia
- Family: Chrysomelidae
- Tribe: Clytrini
- Genus: Urodera; Lacordaire, 1848

Genus of beetles

Urodera is a genus of case-bearing leaf beetles in the family Chrysomelidae. There are about nine described species in Urodera.

== Species ==
These nine species belong to the genus Urodera:

- Urodera crucifera Lacordaire, 1848
- Urodera dilaticollis Jacoby, 1889
- Urodera duplicata Monros
- Urodera fallaciosa Monros
- Urodera inflata Lacordaire
- Urodera inornata Monros
- Urodera lanuginosa Monros
- Urodera mariameliae Monros
- Urodera texana Schaeffer
