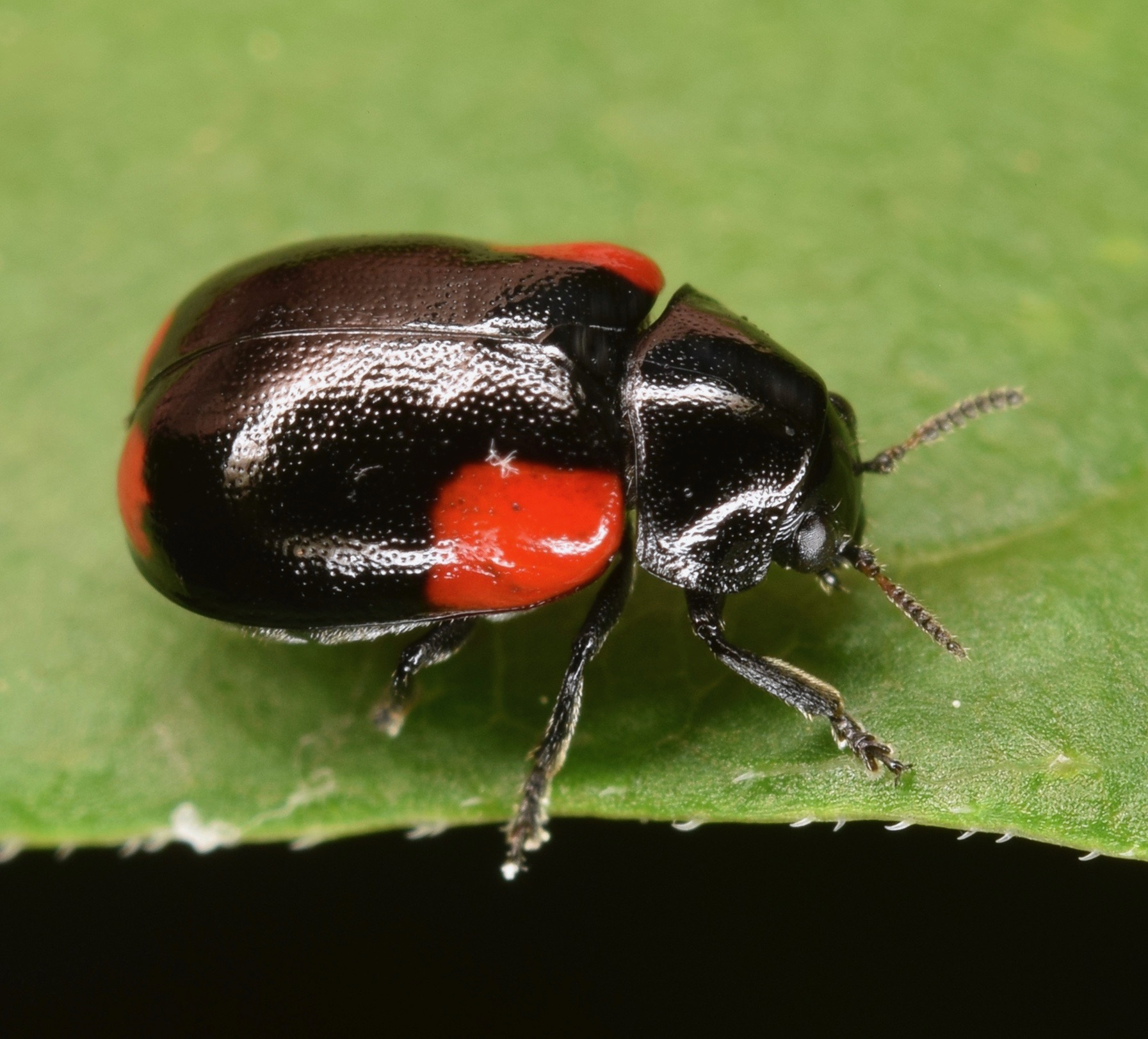
- Babia quadriguttata

Scientific classification
- Kingdom: Animalia
- Phylum: Arthropoda
- Clade: Pancrustacea
- Class: Insecta
- Order: Coleoptera
- Suborder: Polyphaga
- Infraorder: Cucujiformia
- Family: Chrysomelidae
- Subfamily: Cryptocephalinae
- Tribe: Clytrini
- Genus: Babia; Chevrolat, 1836

Species
- See text

= Babia (beetle) =

Genus of beetles

The genus Babia comprises a number of species of leaf beetles in the subfamily Cryptocephalinae, though historically they were often treated within a subfamily Clytrinae. The number of species in the genus is at least 12, but as there are almost as many described members which are subspecies (a rank which is not universally accepted), this number may be greater in some classifications.

== Species ==
These two species belong to the genus Babia:

- Babia quadriguttata (Olivier, 1791)^{i c g b} (eastern babia)
- Babia tetraspilota J. L. LeConte, 1858^{i c g b} (western babia)

Data sources: i = ITIS, c = Catalogue of Life, g = GBIF, b = Bugguide.net
