= Coleothorpa mucorea =

Scientific classification
- Kingdom: Animalia
- Phylum: Arthropoda
- Clade: Pancrustacea
- Class: Insecta
- Order: Coleoptera
- Suborder: Polyphaga
- Infraorder: Cucujiformia
- Family: Chrysomelidae
- Subfamily: Cryptocephalinae
- Tribe: Clytrini
- Genus: Coleothorpa
- Species: C. mucorea

Binomial name
- Coleothorpa mucorea J. L. LeConte, 1858

Species of beetle

Coleothorpa mucorea is a species of case-bearing leaf beetles in the family Chrysomelidae. It has two subspecies. It is found in North America.

== Subspecies ==
- C. mucorea mucorea (J. L. LeConte, 1858)
- C. mucorea schaefferi (Clavareau in Jacoby and Clavareau, 1907)
