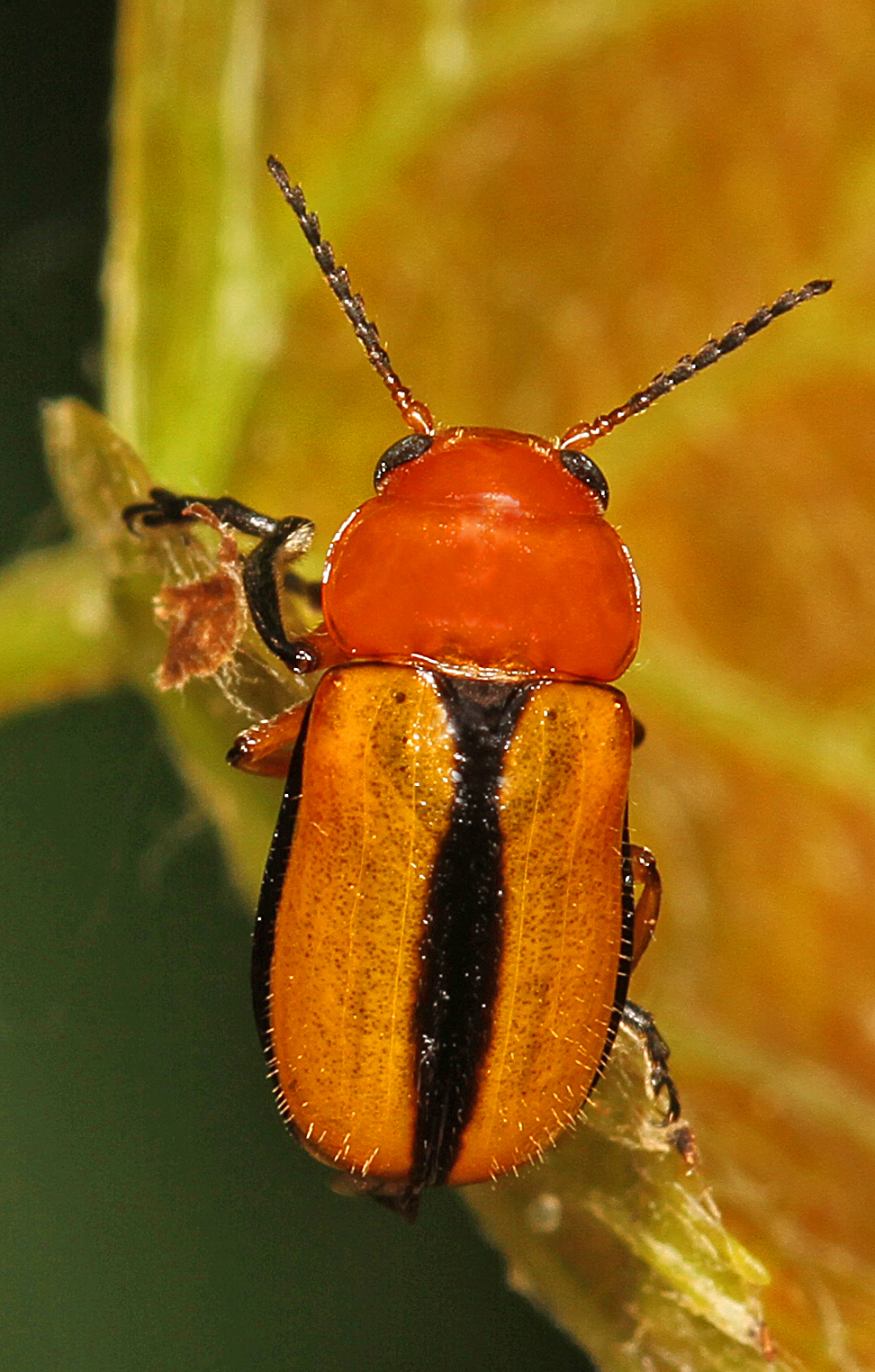
- Anomoea laticlavia

Scientific classification
- Kingdom: Animalia
- Phylum: Arthropoda
- Clade: Pancrustacea
- Class: Insecta
- Order: Coleoptera
- Suborder: Polyphaga
- Infraorder: Cucujiformia
- Family: Chrysomelidae
- Tribe: Clytrini
- Genus: Anomoea; Agassiz, 1846

= Anomoea =

Genus of beetles

Anomoea is a genus of leaf beetles in the subfamily Cryptocephalinae. The name is frequently confused with the tephritid fly genus Anomoia, due to historical confusion over precedence.

== Selected species ==
- Anomoea flavokansiensis Moldenke, 1970
- Anomoea laticlavia Forster, 1771
- Anomoea nitidicollis Schaeffer, 1919
- Anomoea rufifrons Lacordaire, 1848
