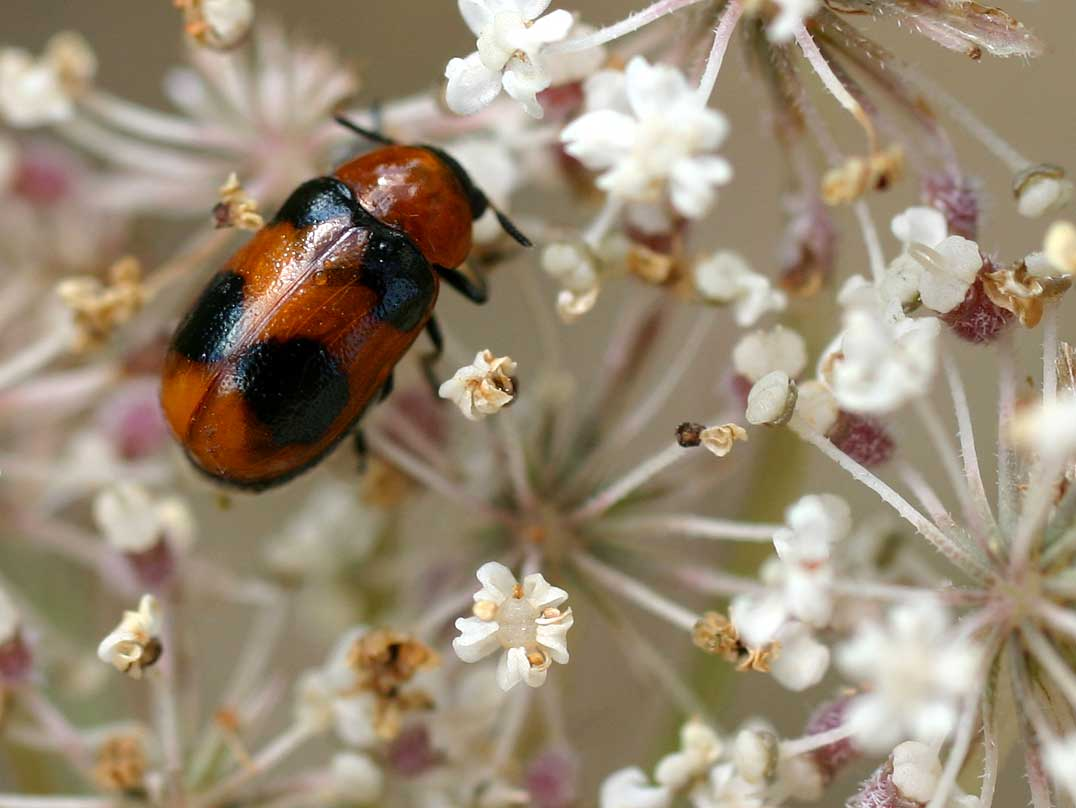
- Coptocephala scopolina

Scientific classification
- Kingdom: Animalia
- Phylum: Arthropoda
- Clade: Pancrustacea
- Class: Insecta
- Order: Coleoptera
- Suborder: Polyphaga
- Infraorder: Cucujiformia
- Family: Chrysomelidae
- Subfamily: Cryptocephalinae
- Tribe: Clytrini
- Genus: Coptocephala; Chevrolat, 1836

= Coptocephala =

Genus of beetles

Coptocephala is a genus of beetles belonging to the family Chrysomelidae. The genus was first described by Louis Alexandre Auguste Chevrolat in 1836.

The species of this genus are found in Eurasia and Africa.

== Species ==
- Coptocephala arcasi Báguena, 1960
- Coptocephala brevicornis (Lefèvre, 1872)
- Coptocephala chalybaea (Germar, 1824)
- Coptocephala crassipes Lefèvre, 1876
- Coptocephala cyanocephala (Lacordaire, 1848)
- Coptocephala fossulata Lefèvre, 1872
- Coptocephala gebleri Gebler, 1841
- Coptocephala hellenica Warchalowski, 1991
- Coptocephala linnaeana Petitpierre & Alonso-Zarazaga, 2000
- Coptocephala plagiocephala (Fabricius, 1792)
- Coptocephala raffrayi (Desbrochers des Loges, 1870)
- Coptocephala rubicunda (Laichardting, 1781)
- Coptocephala scopolina (Linnaeus, 1767)
- Coptocephala unicolor (Lucas, 1845)
- Coptocephala unifasciata (Scopoli, 1763)
- Coptocephala volatica Normand, 1949
