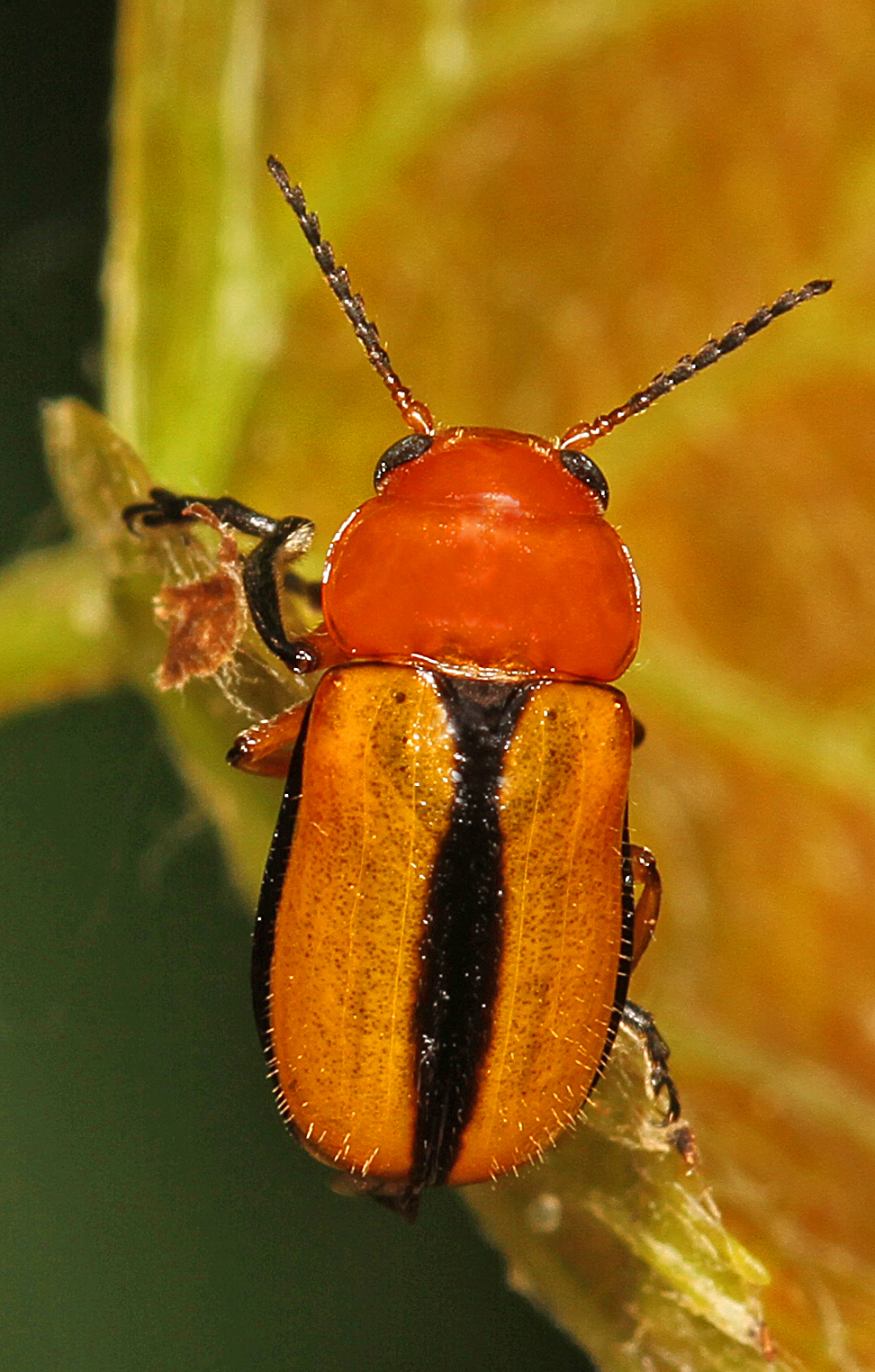

Scientific classification
- Domain: Eukaryota
- Kingdom: Animalia
- Phylum: Arthropoda
- Class: Insecta
- Order: Coleoptera
- Suborder: Polyphaga
- Infraorder: Cucujiformia
- Family: Chrysomelidae
- Genus: Anomoea
- Species: A. laticlavia

Binomial name
- Anomoea laticlavia Forster, 1771

= Anomoea laticlavia =

Species of beetle

Anomoea laticlavia (Persimmon beetle, Clay-colored leaf beetle) is a reddish-brown and black leaf beetle native to central and eastern North America. It feeds on the leaves of Fabaceae, persimmons, and other species in its adult phase.

== Description ==
A. laticlavia adults are 7 to 12mm. It is recognizable with variable width black suture on a reddish-brown elytron. Males' front legs are relatively large. A. laticlavia is in the unranked taxon Camptosomata, or case-bearing leaf beetles.

== Ecology ==
Larvae are subterranean root or litter feeders. Reported adult host-plants include legumes, oaks, willows, persimmon, and ragweed. Some Florida populations are identified as a subspecies.

== See also ==
- Leaf beetle
