= Megalostomis subfasciata =

Scientific classification
- Kingdom: Animalia
- Phylum: Arthropoda
- Clade: Pancrustacea
- Class: Insecta
- Order: Coleoptera
- Suborder: Polyphaga
- Infraorder: Cucujiformia
- Family: Chrysomelidae
- Genus: Megalostomis
- Species: M. subfasciata

Binomial name
- Megalostomis subfasciata (J. L. LeConte, 1868)

Species of beetle

Megalostomis subfasciata is a species of case-bearing leaf beetle in the family Chrysomelidae. It is found in Central America and North America.
