= Anomoea nitidicollis =

Scientific classification
- Kingdom: Animalia
- Phylum: Arthropoda
- Clade: Pancrustacea
- Class: Insecta
- Order: Coleoptera
- Suborder: Polyphaga
- Infraorder: Cucujiformia
- Family: Chrysomelidae
- Genus: Anomoea
- Species: A. nitidicollis

Binomial name
- Anomoea nitidicollis Schaeffer, 1920

Species of beetle

Anomoea nitidicollis is a species of case-bearing leaf beetle in the family Chrysomelidae. It is found in Central America and North America.

== Subspecies ==
These two subspecies belong to the species Anomoea nitidicollis:

- Anomoea nitidicollis crassicornis Schaeffer, 1933^{i c g b}
- Anomoea nitidicollis nitidicollis Schaeffer, 1920^{i c g b}

Data sources: i = ITIS, c = Catalogue of Life, g = GBIF, b = Bugguide.net
