= Urodera crucifera =

Scientific classification
- Kingdom: Animalia
- Phylum: Arthropoda
- Clade: Pancrustacea
- Class: Insecta
- Order: Coleoptera
- Suborder: Polyphaga
- Infraorder: Cucujiformia
- Family: Chrysomelidae
- Genus: Urodera
- Species: U. crucifera

Binomial name
- Urodera crucifera Lacordaire, 1848

Species of beetle

Urodera crucifera is a species of case-bearing leaf beetle in the family Chrysomelidae. It is found in Central America and North America.

== Subspecies ==
These two subspecies belong to the species Urodera crucifera:

- Urodera crucifera crucifera
- Urodera crucifera texana Schaeffer, 1919
