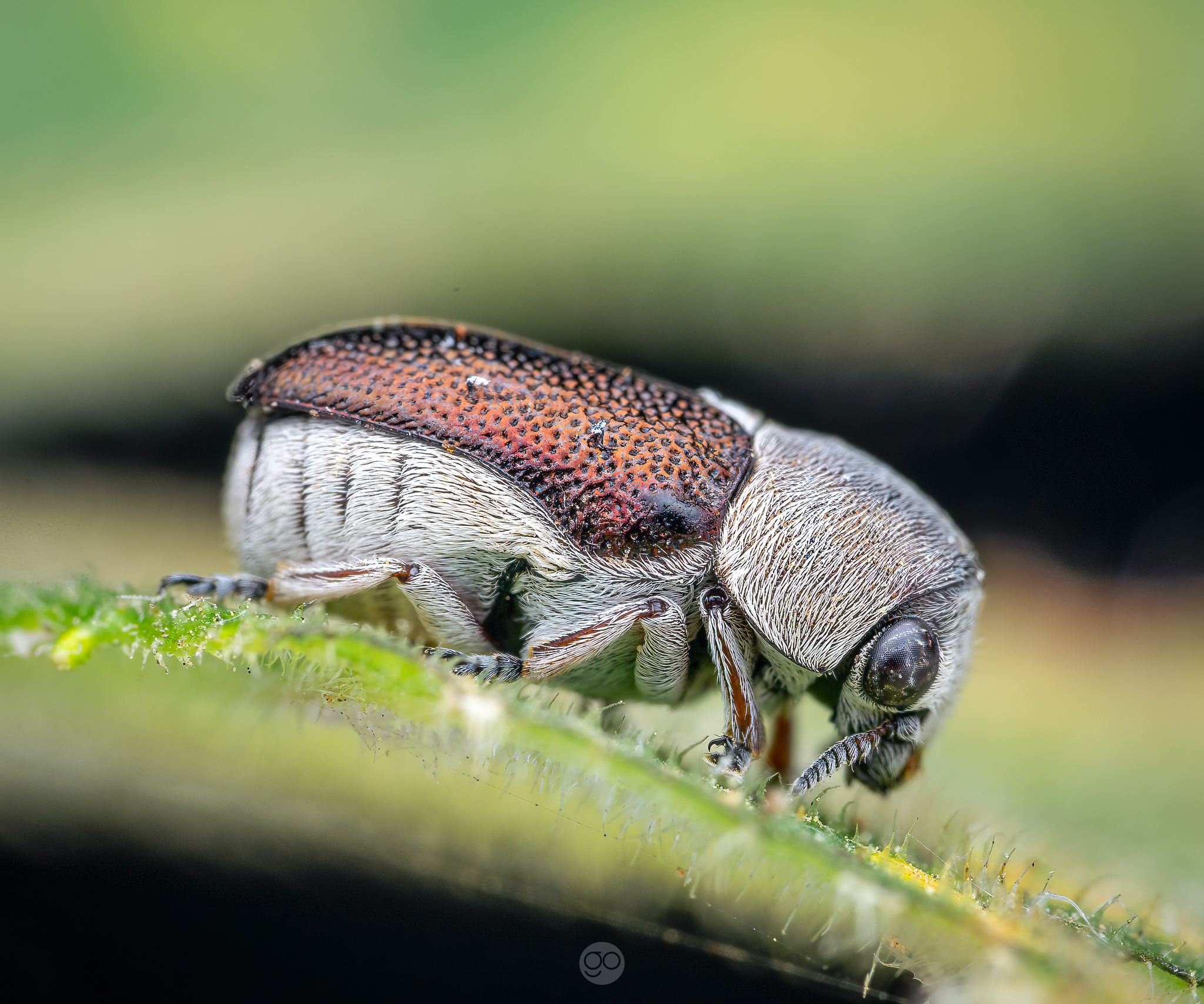
- Michoacán, Mexico, 2023

Scientific classification
- Kingdom: Animalia
- Phylum: Arthropoda
- Clade: Pancrustacea
- Class: Insecta
- Order: Coleoptera
- Suborder: Polyphaga
- Infraorder: Cucujiformia
- Family: Chrysomelidae
- Genus: Coscinoptera
- Species: C. aeneipennis

Binomial name
- Coscinoptera aeneipennis (J. L. LeConte, 1858)

= Coscinoptera aeneipennis =

Species of beetle

Coscinoptera aeneipennis is a species of case-bearing leaf beetle in the family Chrysomelidae. It is found in Central America and North America.
