= Babia tetraspilota =

Scientific classification
- Kingdom: Animalia
- Phylum: Arthropoda
- Clade: Pancrustacea
- Class: Insecta
- Order: Coleoptera
- Suborder: Polyphaga
- Infraorder: Cucujiformia
- Family: Chrysomelidae
- Genus: Babia
- Species: B. tetraspilota

Binomial name
- Babia tetraspilota J. L. LeConte, 1858

Species of beetle

Babia tetraspilota, the western babia, is a species of case-bearing leaf beetle in the family Chrysomelidae. It is found in Central America and North America.

== Subspecies ==
These three subspecies belong to the species Babia tetraspilota:

- Babia tetraspilota tenuis Schaeffer, 1933
- Babia tetraspilota tetraspilota J. L. LeConte, 1858
- Babia tetraspilota texana Schaeffer, 1933
