= Coleorozena pilatei =

Scientific classification
- Kingdom: Animalia
- Phylum: Arthropoda
- Clade: Pancrustacea
- Class: Insecta
- Order: Coleoptera
- Suborder: Polyphaga
- Infraorder: Cucujiformia
- Family: Chrysomelidae
- Genus: Coleorozena
- Species: C. pilatei

Binomial name
- Coleorozena pilatei (Lacordaire, 1848)

Species of beetle

Coleorozena pilatei is a species of case-bearing leaf beetle in the family Chrysomelidae. It is found in Central America and North America.

== Subspecies ==
These three subspecies belong to the species Coleorozena pilatei:

- Coleorozena pilatei californiensis (Moldenke, 1970)
- Coleorozena pilatei pilatei (Lacordaire, 1848)
- Coleorozena pilatei subtilis (Horn, 1892)
