= Coleorozena subnigra =

Scientific classification
- Kingdom: Animalia
- Phylum: Arthropoda
- Clade: Pancrustacea
- Class: Insecta
- Order: Coleoptera
- Suborder: Polyphaga
- Infraorder: Cucujiformia
- Family: Chrysomelidae
- Genus: Coleorozena
- Species: C. subnigra

Binomial name
- Coleorozena subnigra Schaeffer, 1905

Species of beetle

Coleorozena subnigra is a species of case-bearing leaf beetle in the family Chrysomelidae. It has no subspecies. It is found in North America.
