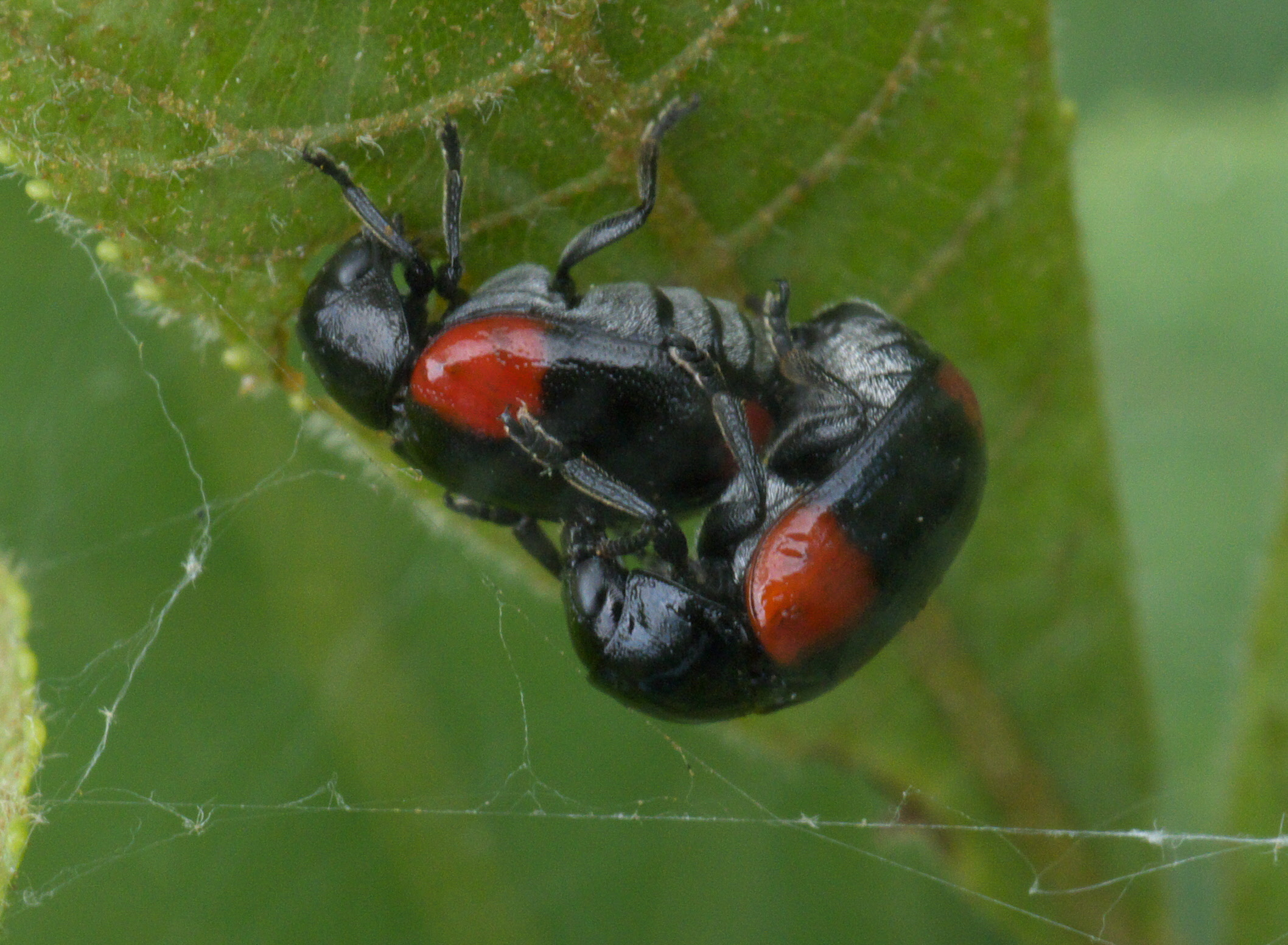

Scientific classification
- Kingdom: Animalia
- Phylum: Arthropoda
- Clade: Pancrustacea
- Class: Insecta
- Order: Coleoptera
- Suborder: Polyphaga
- Infraorder: Cucujiformia
- Family: Chrysomelidae
- Genus: Babia
- Species: B. quadriguttata

Binomial name
- Babia quadriguttata (Olivier, 1791)

= Babia quadriguttata =

Species of beetle

Babia quadriguttata, the eastern babia, is a species of case-bearing leaf beetle in the family Chrysomelidae. It is found in North America.

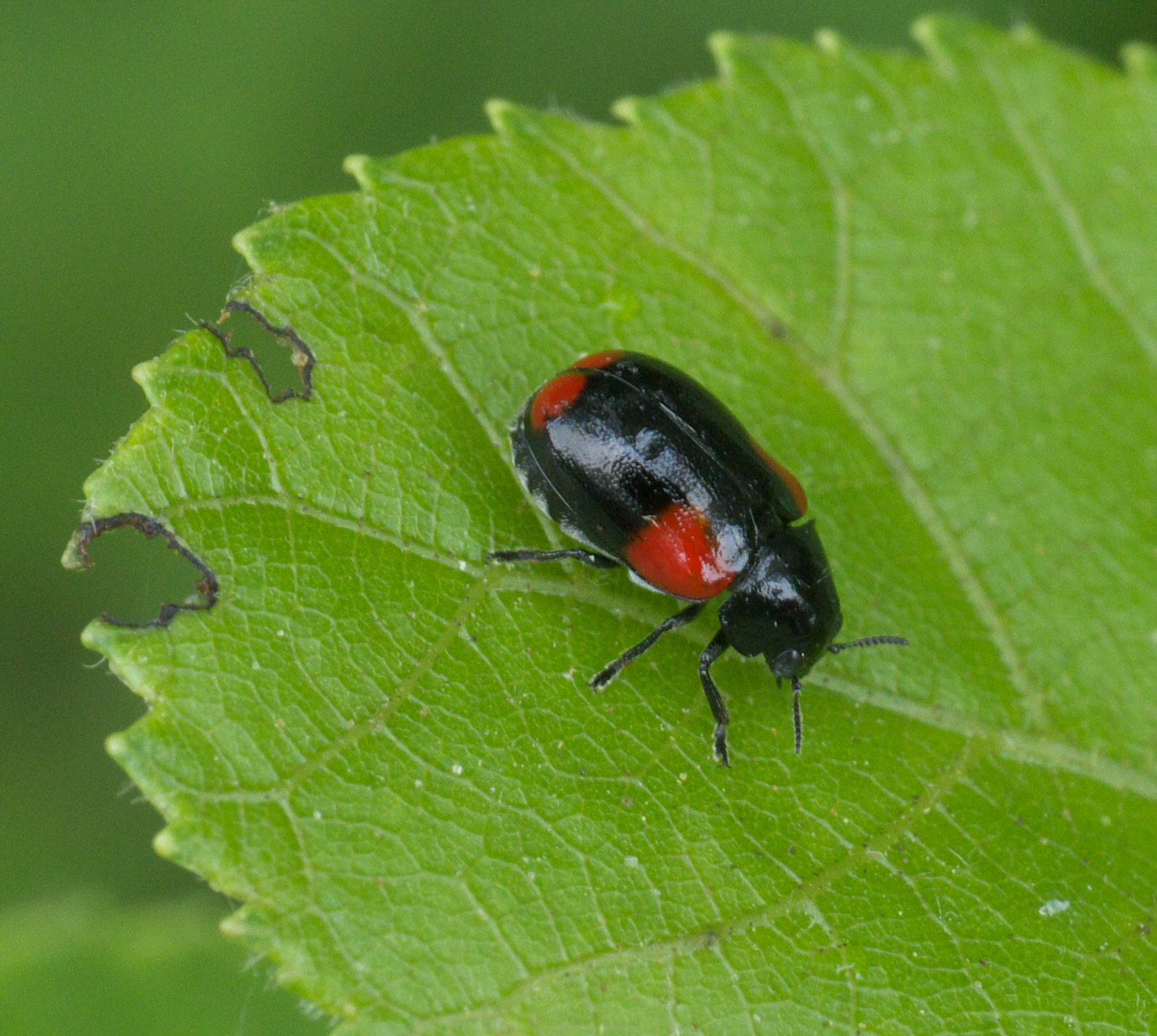
Eastern babia, Babia quadriguttata

== Subspecies ==
These four subspecies belong to the species Babia quadriguttata:

- Babia quadriguttata magnasmokiae Moldenke, 1970
- Babia quadriguttata pulla Lacordaire, 1848
- Babia quadriguttata quadriguttata (Olivier, 1791)
- Babia quadriguttata tenuis Schaeffer
