= Coleothorpa axillaris =

Scientific classification
- Kingdom: Animalia
- Phylum: Arthropoda
- Clade: Pancrustacea
- Class: Insecta
- Order: Coleoptera
- Suborder: Polyphaga
- Infraorder: Cucujiformia
- Family: Chrysomelidae
- Genus: Coleothorpa
- Species: C. axillaris

Binomial name
- Coleothorpa axillaris (J. L. LeConte, 1868)

Species of beetle

Coleothorpa axillaris is a species of case-bearing leaf beetle in the family Chrysomelidae. It is found in Central America and North America.

== Subspecies ==
These eight subspecies belong to the species Coleothorpa axillaris:

- Coleothorpa axillaris axillaris (J. L. LeConte, 1868)^{i c g}
- Coleothorpa axillaris canella (J. L. LeConte, 1884)^{i c g}
- Coleothorpa axillaris corpilosa (R. Dahl, 1941)^{i c g}
- Coleothorpa axillaris panamintensis (Moldenke, 1970)^{i c g}
- Coleothorpa axillaris quadratominor (Moldenke, 1970)^{i g b}
- Coleothorpa axillaris roseaxillaris (Moldenke, 1970)^{i c g}
- Coleothorpa axillaris rubracanella (Moldenke, 1970)^{i c g}
- Coleothorpa axillaris sierrensis (Moldenke, 1970)^{i c g}

Data sources: i = ITIS, c = Catalogue of Life, g = GBIF, b = Bugguide.net
