= Coleorozena longicollis =

Scientific classification
- Kingdom: Animalia
- Phylum: Arthropoda
- Clade: Pancrustacea
- Class: Insecta
- Order: Coleoptera
- Suborder: Polyphaga
- Infraorder: Cucujiformia
- Family: Chrysomelidae
- Genus: Coleorozena
- Species: C. longicollis

Binomial name
- Coleorozena longicollis Jacoby, 1888

Species of beetle

Coleorozena longicollis is a species of case-bearing leaf beetle in the family Chrysomelidae. It has one subspecies. It is found in North America.

== Subspecies ==
Coleorozena longicollis longicollis (Jacoby, 1888)
