= Anomoea rufifrons =

Scientific classification
- Kingdom: Animalia
- Phylum: Arthropoda
- Clade: Pancrustacea
- Class: Insecta
- Order: Coleoptera
- Suborder: Polyphaga
- Infraorder: Cucujiformia
- Family: Chrysomelidae
- Genus: Anomoea
- Species: A. rufifrons

Binomial name
- Anomoea rufifrons (Lacordaire, 1848)

Species of beetle

Anomoea rufifrons is a species of case-bearing leaf beetle in the family Chrysomelidae. It is found in Central America and North America.
