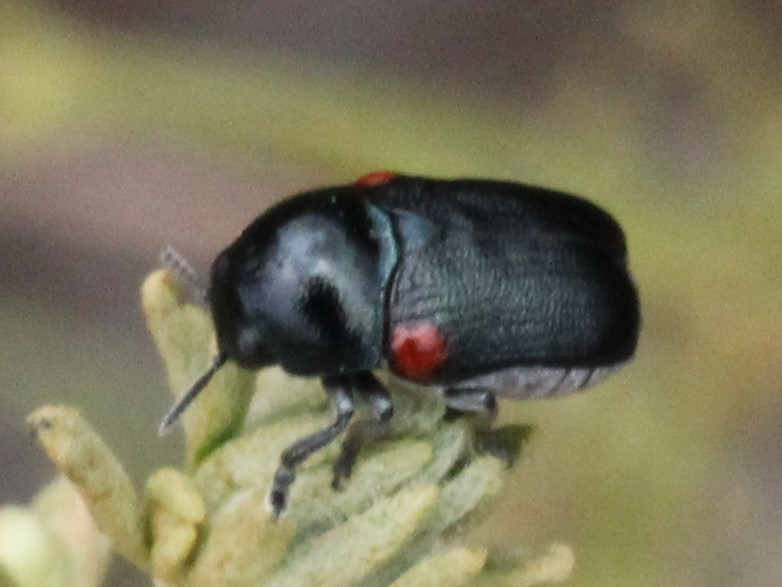

Scientific classification
- Kingdom: Animalia
- Phylum: Arthropoda
- Clade: Pancrustacea
- Class: Insecta
- Order: Coleoptera
- Suborder: Polyphaga
- Infraorder: Cucujiformia
- Family: Chrysomelidae
- Genus: Saxinis
- Species: S. deserticola

Binomial name
- Saxinis deserticola Moldenke, 1970

= Saxinis deserticola =

Species of beetle

Saxinis deserticola is a species of case-bearing leaf beetle in the family Chrysomelidae. It is found in Central America and North America.

== Subspecies ==
These two subspecies belong to the species Saxinis deserticola:

- Saxinis deserticola deserticola Moldenke, 1970^{i c g}
- Saxinis deserticola mojavensis Moldenke, 1970^{i c g}

Data sources: i = ITIS, c = Catalogue of Life, g = GBIF, b = Bugguide.net
