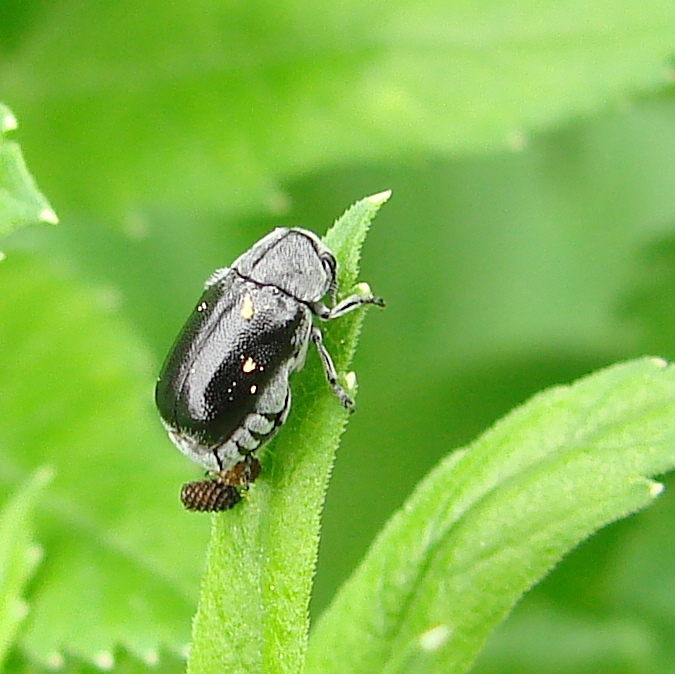

Scientific classification
- Kingdom: Animalia
- Phylum: Arthropoda
- Clade: Pancrustacea
- Class: Insecta
- Order: Coleoptera
- Suborder: Polyphaga
- Infraorder: Cucujiformia
- Family: Chrysomelidae
- Genus: Coleothorpa
- Species: C. dominicana

Binomial name
- Coleothorpa dominicana (Fabricius, 1801)

= Coleothorpa dominicana =

Species of beetle

Coleothorpa dominicana is a species of case-bearing leaf beetle in the family Chrysomelidae. It is found in North America. These case-bearing leaf beetles lay eggs and the female beetle constructs a funnel structure that helps protect the eggs. The larvae lasts for 5 to 8 months and it takes about one year to fully develop the beetles to adulthood.

== Subspecies ==
These two subspecies belong to the species Coleothorpa dominicana:

- Coleothorpa dominicana dominicana (Fabricius, 1801)^{i c g}
- Coleothorpa dominicana franciscana (J. L. LeConte, 1859)^{i c g}

Data sources: i = ITIS, c = Catalogue of Life, g = GBIF, b = Bugguide.net
