= Coleorozena vittata =

Scientific classification
- Kingdom: Animalia
- Phylum: Arthropoda
- Clade: Pancrustacea
- Class: Insecta
- Order: Coleoptera
- Suborder: Polyphaga
- Infraorder: Cucujiformia
- Family: Chrysomelidae
- Genus: Coleorozena
- Species: C. vittata

Binomial name
- Coleorozena vittata (J. L. LeConte, 1858)

Species of beetle

Coleorozena vittata is a species of case-bearing leaf beetle in the family Chrysomelidae. It is found in Central America and North America.

== Subspecies ==
These three subspecies belong to the species Coleorozena vittata:

- Coleorozena vittata corta (Moldenke, 1970)
- Coleorozena vittata larga (Moldenke, 1970)
- Coleorozena vittata vittata (J. L. LeConte, 1858)
