= Anomoea flavokansiensis =

Scientific classification
- Kingdom: Animalia
- Phylum: Arthropoda
- Clade: Pancrustacea
- Class: Insecta
- Order: Coleoptera
- Suborder: Polyphaga
- Infraorder: Cucujiformia
- Family: Chrysomelidae
- Genus: Anomoea
- Species: A. flavokansiensis

Binomial name
- Anomoea flavokansiensis Moldenke, 1970

Species of beetle

Anomoea flavokansiensis is a species of case-bearing leaf beetle in the family Chrysomelidae. It is found in North America.
