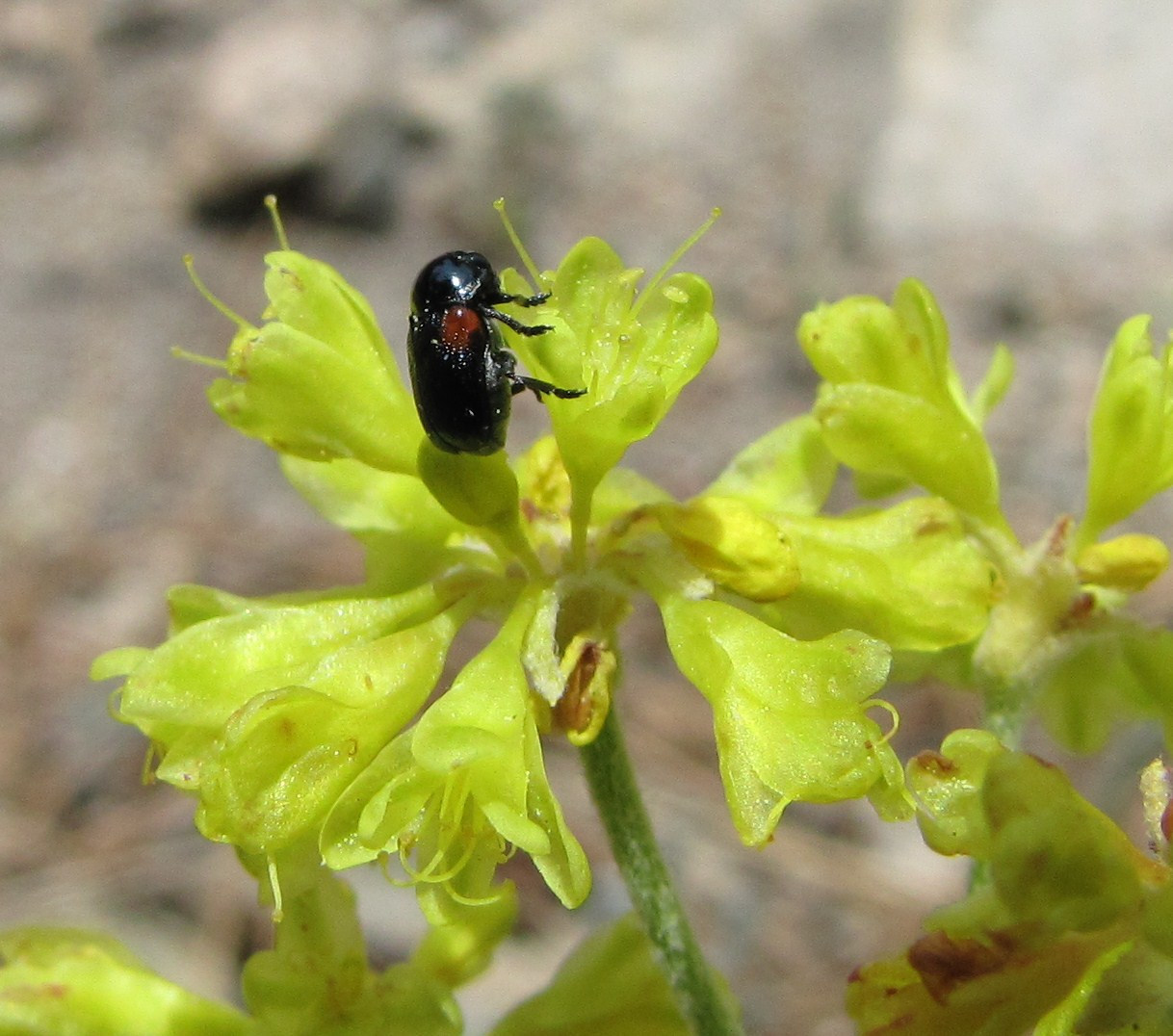

Scientific classification
- Kingdom: Animalia
- Phylum: Arthropoda
- Clade: Pancrustacea
- Class: Insecta
- Order: Coleoptera
- Suborder: Polyphaga
- Infraorder: Cucujiformia
- Family: Chrysomelidae
- Genus: Saxinis
- Species: S. saucia

Binomial name
- Saxinis saucia J. L. LeConte, 1857

= Saxinis saucia =

Species of beetle

Saxinis saucia is a species of case-bearing leaf beetle in the family Chrysomelidae. It is found in Central America and North America.

== Subspecies ==
These nine subspecies belong to the species Saxinis saucia:

- Saxinis saucia bisignata (Walker in Lord, 1866)
- Saxinis saucia californica Schaeffer, 1906
- Saxinis saucia immaculata Moldenke, 1970
- Saxinis saucia inyoensis Moldenke, 1970
- Saxinis saucia kaibabiae Moldenke, 1970
- Saxinis saucia monoensis Moldenke, 1970
- Saxinis saucia propinqua Jacoby, 1878
- Saxinis saucia saucia J. L. LeConte, 1857
- Saxinis saucia speculifera Horn, 1892
