= Coscinoptera =

Scientific classification
- Kingdom: Animalia
- Phylum: Arthropoda
- Clade: Pancrustacea
- Class: Insecta
- Order: Coleoptera
- Suborder: Polyphaga
- Infraorder: Cucujiformia
- Family: Chrysomelidae
- Subfamily: Cryptocephalinae
- Tribe: Clytrini
- Genus: Coscinoptera; Lacordaire, 1848

Genus of beetles

Coscinoptera is a genus of case-bearing leaf beetles in the family Chrysomelidae.

== Selected species ==
- Coscinoptera aeneipennis (J. L. LeConte, 1858)
- Coscinoptera mucida (Say, 1837)
- Coscinoptera villosa (Jacoby, 1888)
