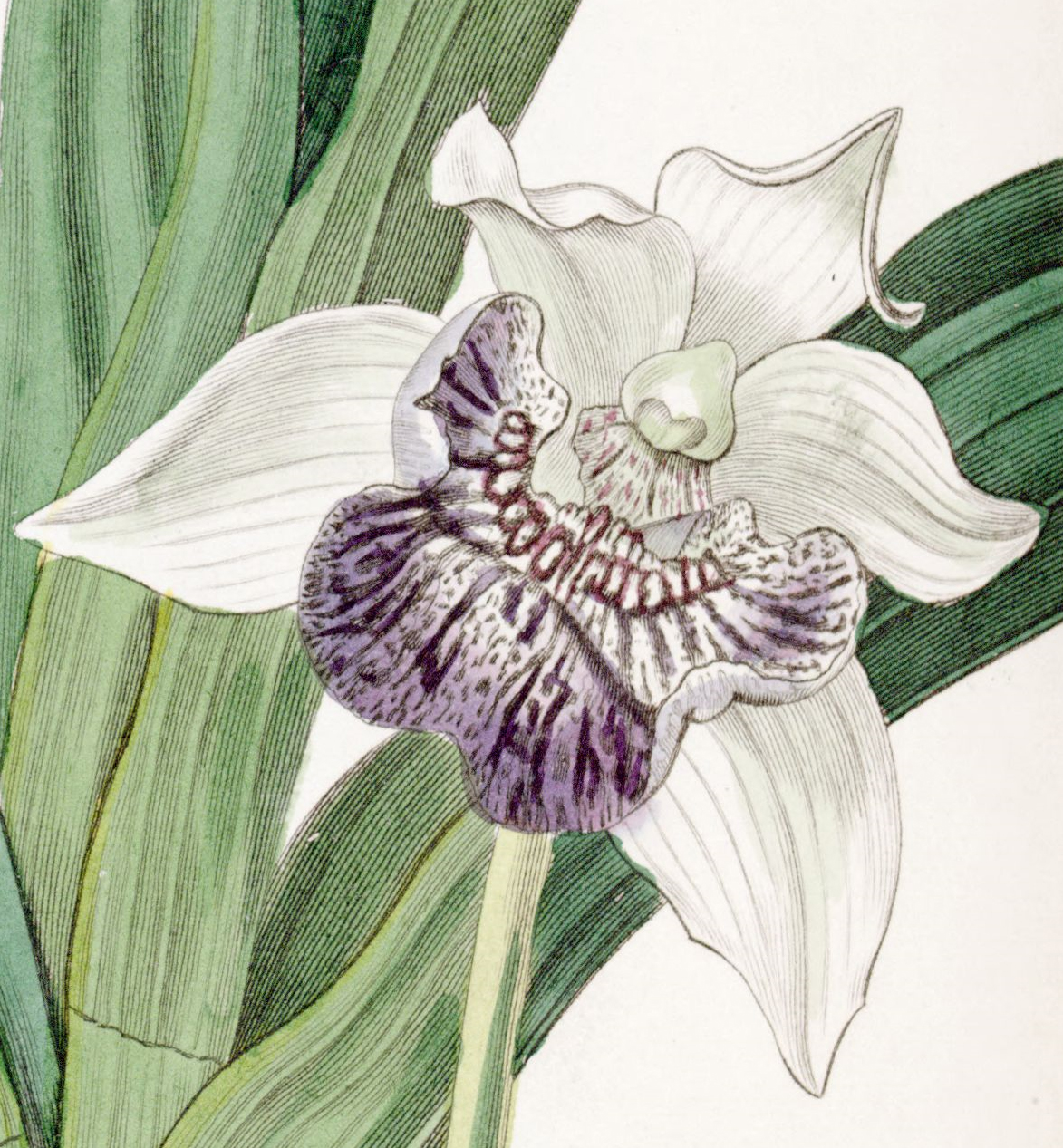
- Cochleanthes flabelliformis

Scientific classification
- Kingdom: Plantae
- Clade: Tracheophytes
- Clade: Angiosperms
- Clade: Monocots
- Order: Asparagales
- Family: Orchidaceae
- Subfamily: Epidendroideae
- Tribe: Cymbidieae
- Subtribe: Zygopetalinae
- Genus: Cochleanthes; Raf.

Type species
- Cochleanthes fragrans (syn of C. flabelliformis) Raf.

= Cochleanthes =

Genus of orchids

The genus Cochleanthes is made up of 4 species of orchids native to Mexico, Central America, the West Indies and South America. The name Cochleanthes refers to the shape of the flower (in Greek, cochlos means "shell" and anthos means "flower").

== Description ==
This genus as a rule lacks pseudobulbs and consequently produces tufted fan-like growths of fairly erect narrow leaves, and conforms to the sympodial method of growth. Plants of this genus produce single-flowered inflorescences, with the flowers often being quite large for the size of the plant, and occurring at any time of the year, though slightly more concentrated during summer in cultivation. All members of this genus have their flowers dominated by the large labellum (lip) which often has longitudinal markings upon it which serve as a nectar guide for pollinating insects. The flowers have four pollinia.

Cochleanthes is best kept under intermediate conditions with fairly high humidity, and should never be allowed to dry out. Plants are epiphytes and grow at elevations of up to 1500 metres in cloud forests.

== List of species ==
1. Cochleanthes aromatica (Rchb.f.) R.E.Schult. & Garay - Costa Rica, Panama
2. Cochleanthes flabelliformis (Sw.) R.E.Schult. & Garay - Mexico, Central America, Cuba, Hispaniola, Jamaica, Puerto Rico, Trinidad, Venezuela, Colombia, Ecuador, Brazil
3. Cochleanthes lueddemanniana (Rchb.f.) R.E.Schult. & Garay - Colombia
4. Cochleanthes trinitatis (Ames) R.E.Schult. & Garay - Trinidad

formerly included

1. Cochleanthes amazonica = Warczewiczella amazonica
2. Cochleanthes candida = Warczewiczella candida
3. Cochleanthes discolor = Warczewiczella discolor
4. Cochleanthes guianensis = Warczewiczella guianensis
5. Cochleanthes ionoleuca = Warczewiczella ionoleuca
6. Cochleanthes lobata = Warczewiczella lobata
7. Cochleanthes marginata= Warczewiczella marginata
8. Cochleanthes palatina = Warczewiczella palatina
9. Cochleanthes wailesiana = Warczewiczella wailesiana
