= C. aromatica =

C. aromatica may refer to:

- Campomanesia aromatica, a plant species endemic to Brazil
- Cochleanthes aromatica, an orchid species
- Curcuma aromatica, the wild turmeric, a plant species found in South Asia

== See also ==
- Aromatica
