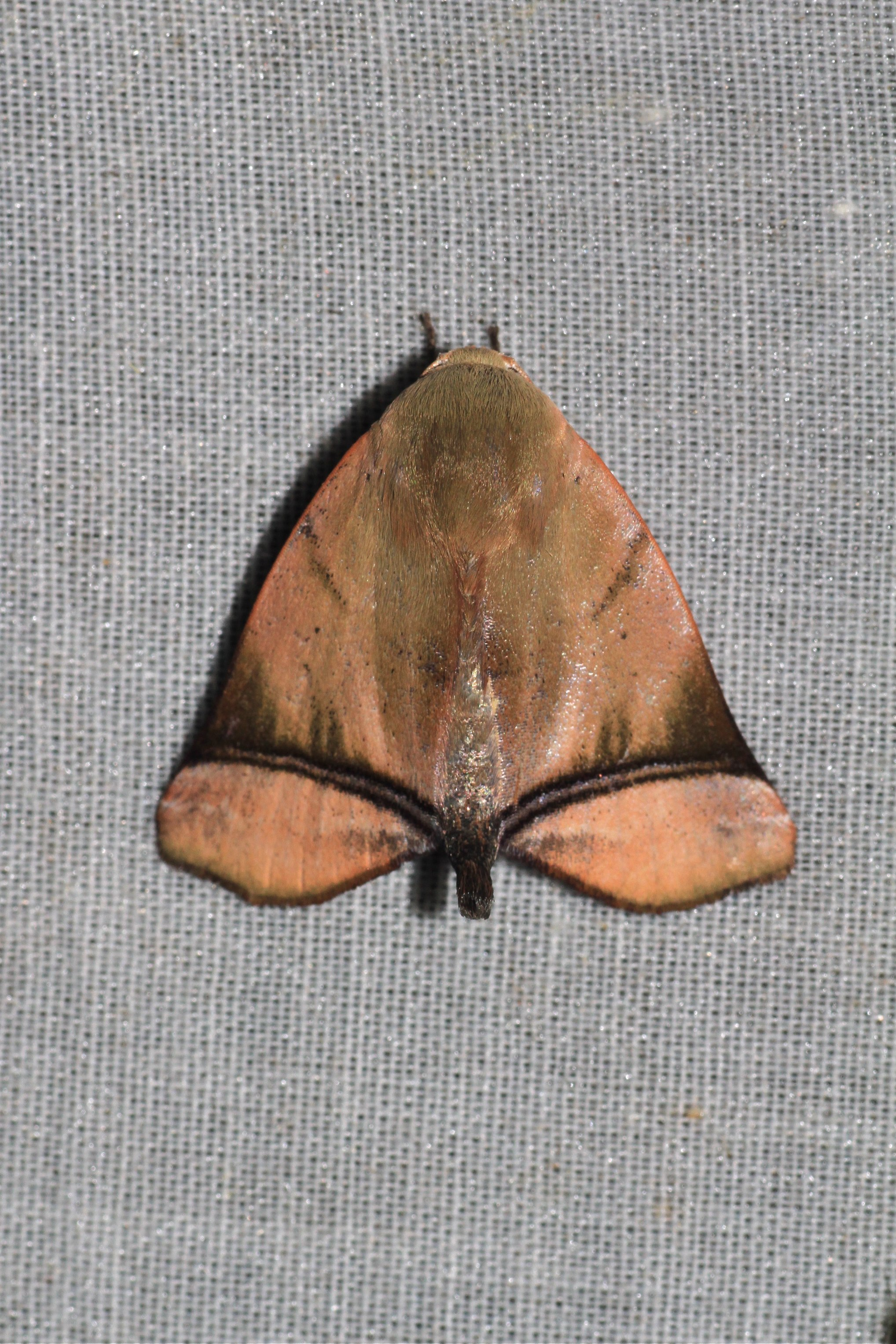

Scientific classification
- Kingdom: Animalia
- Phylum: Arthropoda
- Class: Insecta
- Order: Lepidoptera
- Superfamily: Noctuoidea
- Family: Nolidae
- Genus: Carea
- Species: C. varipes

Binomial name
- Carea varipes Walker, 1856 [1857]

Synonyms
- Chora curvifera Walker, 1862; Dabarita rhodophila Walker, 1865; Carea varipes ab. lilacina Warren, 1913; Carea varipes ab. modesta Warren, 1913; Carea roseotincta Roepke, 1938; Carea varipes Walker; Kobes, 1997

= Carea varipes =

Species of moth

Carea varipes is a moth of the family Nolidae first described by Francis Walker in 1856. It is found in Oriental region to Sundaland.

== Description ==
Its forewings have an axe-head shape. The caterpillar has a distinctive swollen thoracic tumidity. Tumidity is glossy green. A mottled white band runs from the thorax to the conical horn. Its horn is broad and pale green. A small white patch can be found between horn and anal claspers. Its head is red. The caterpillars live singly and are not gregarious. Larval host plants are Eugenia and Rhodomyrtus tomentosa, Campomanesia, Cleistocalyx and Syzygium cumini.

== Subspecies ==
Two subspecies recognized.

- Carea varipes leucobathra Prout, 1922
- Carea varipes roseotincta Roepke, 1938

== Gallery ==
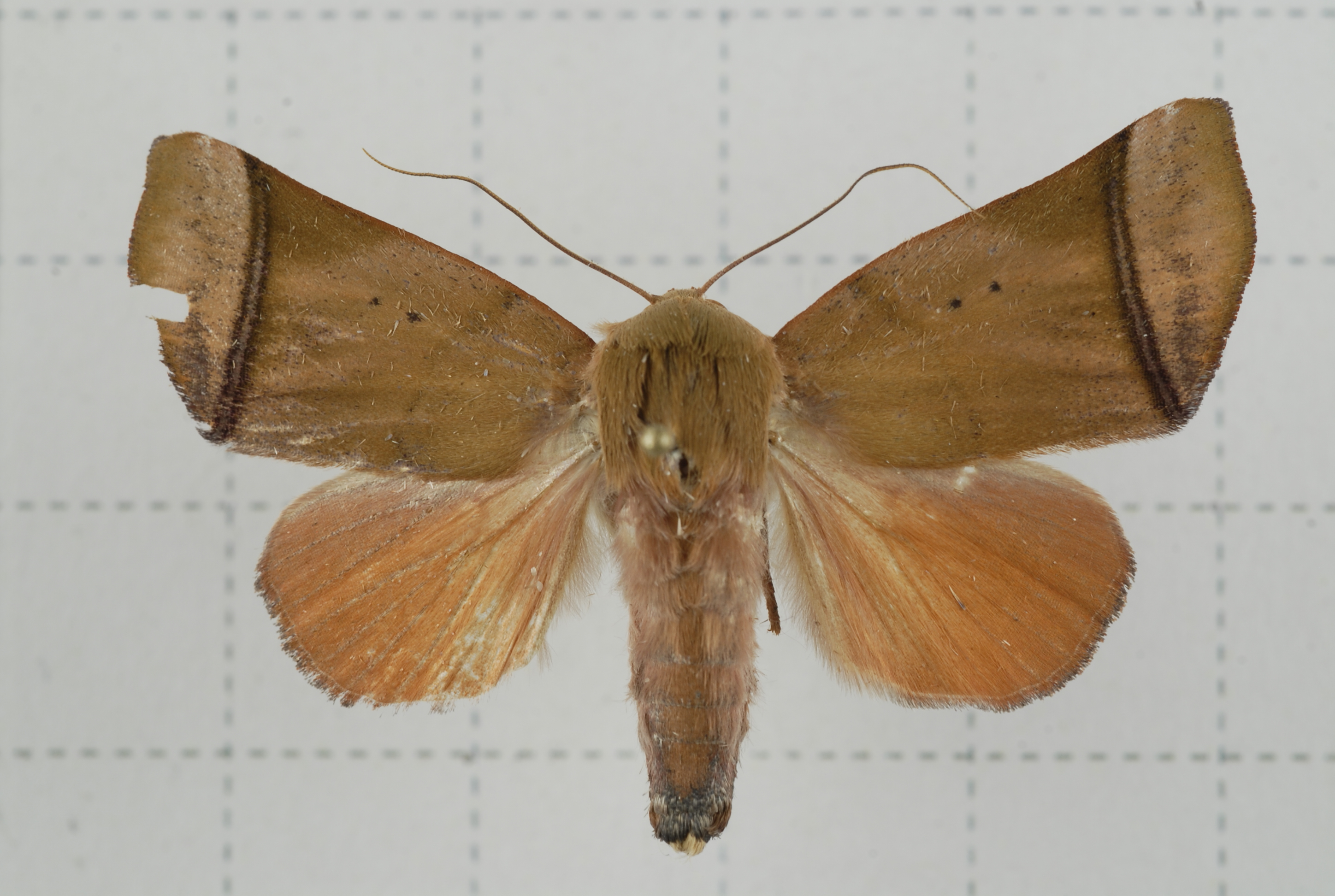

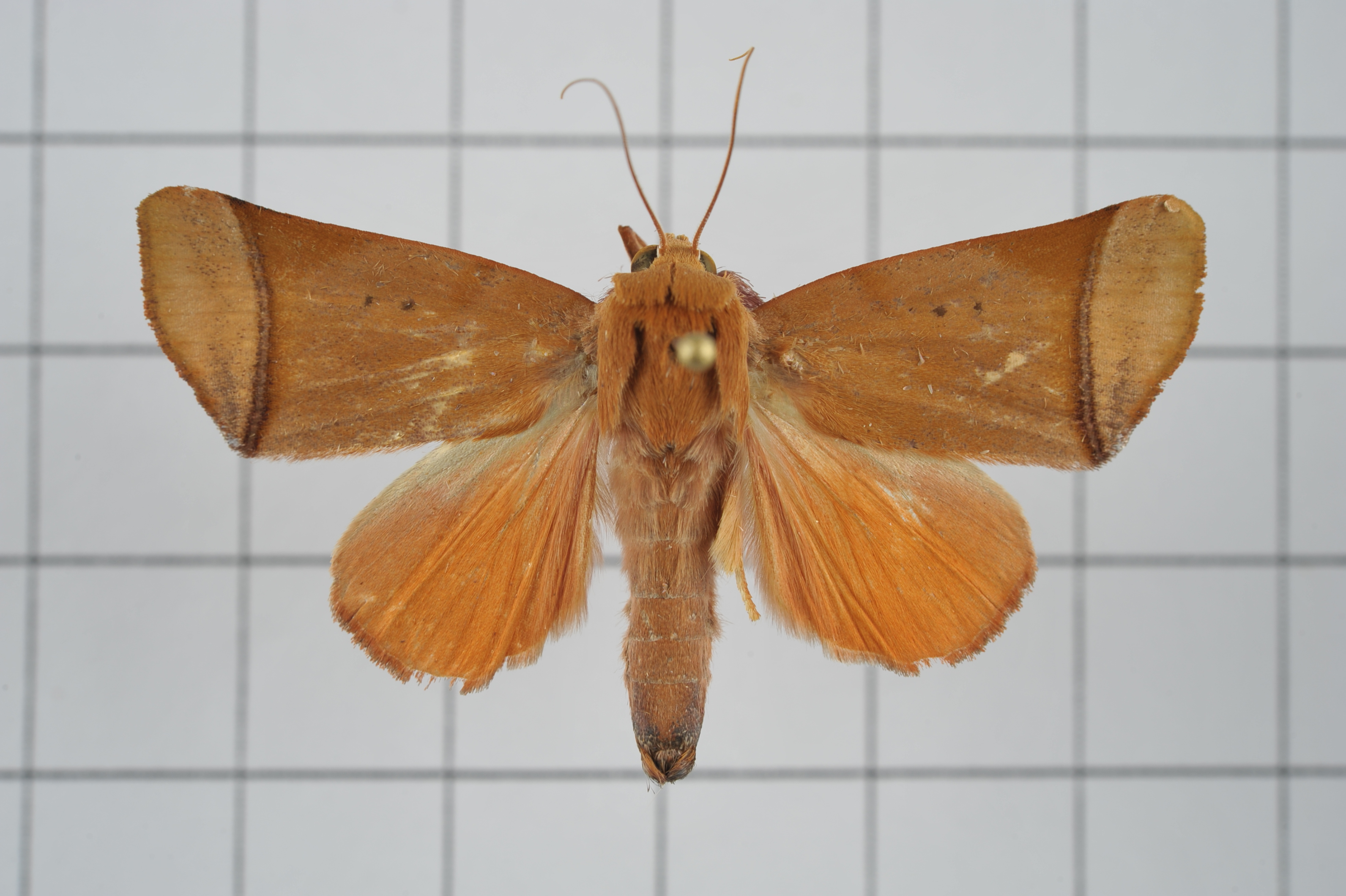

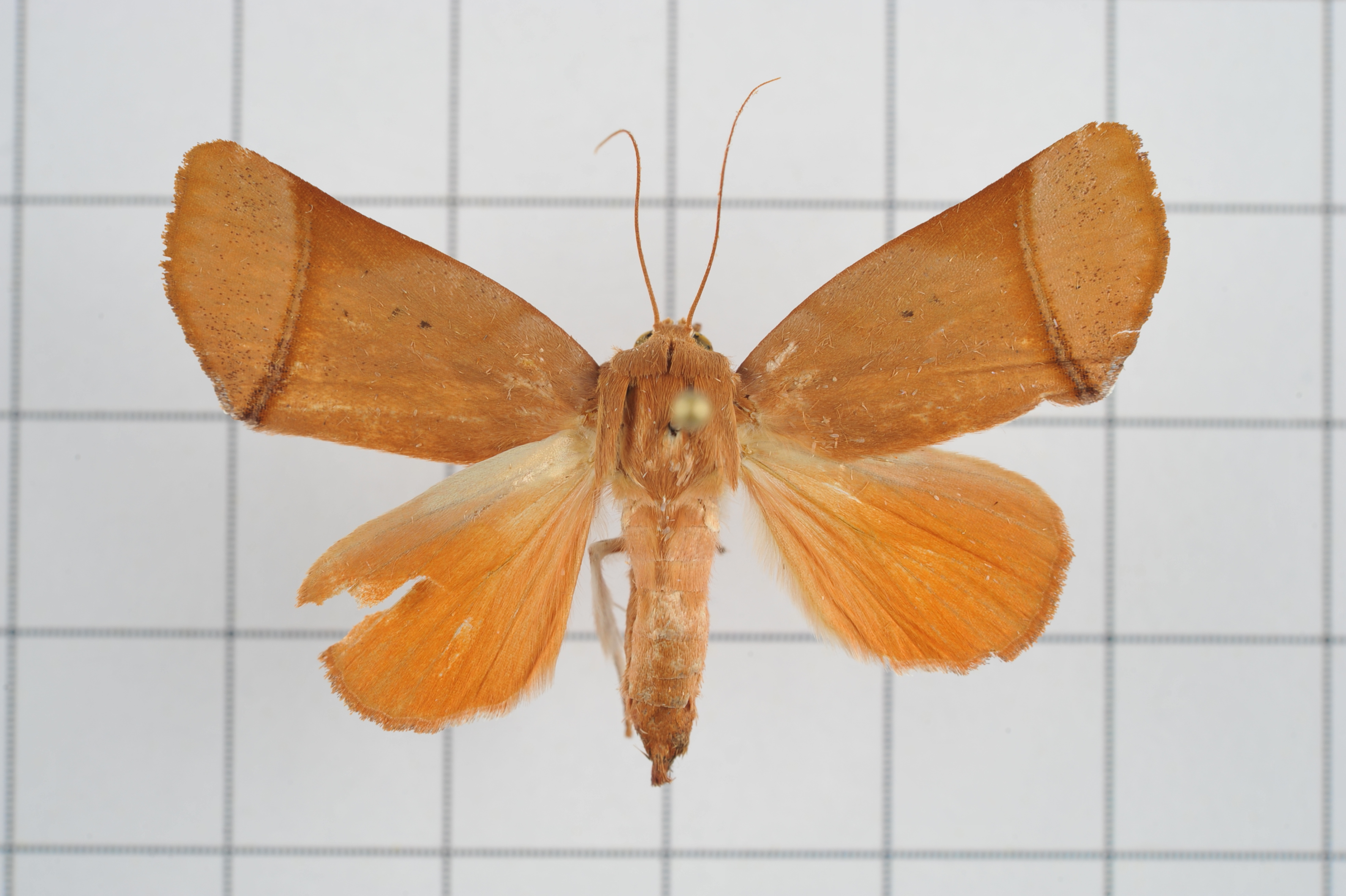

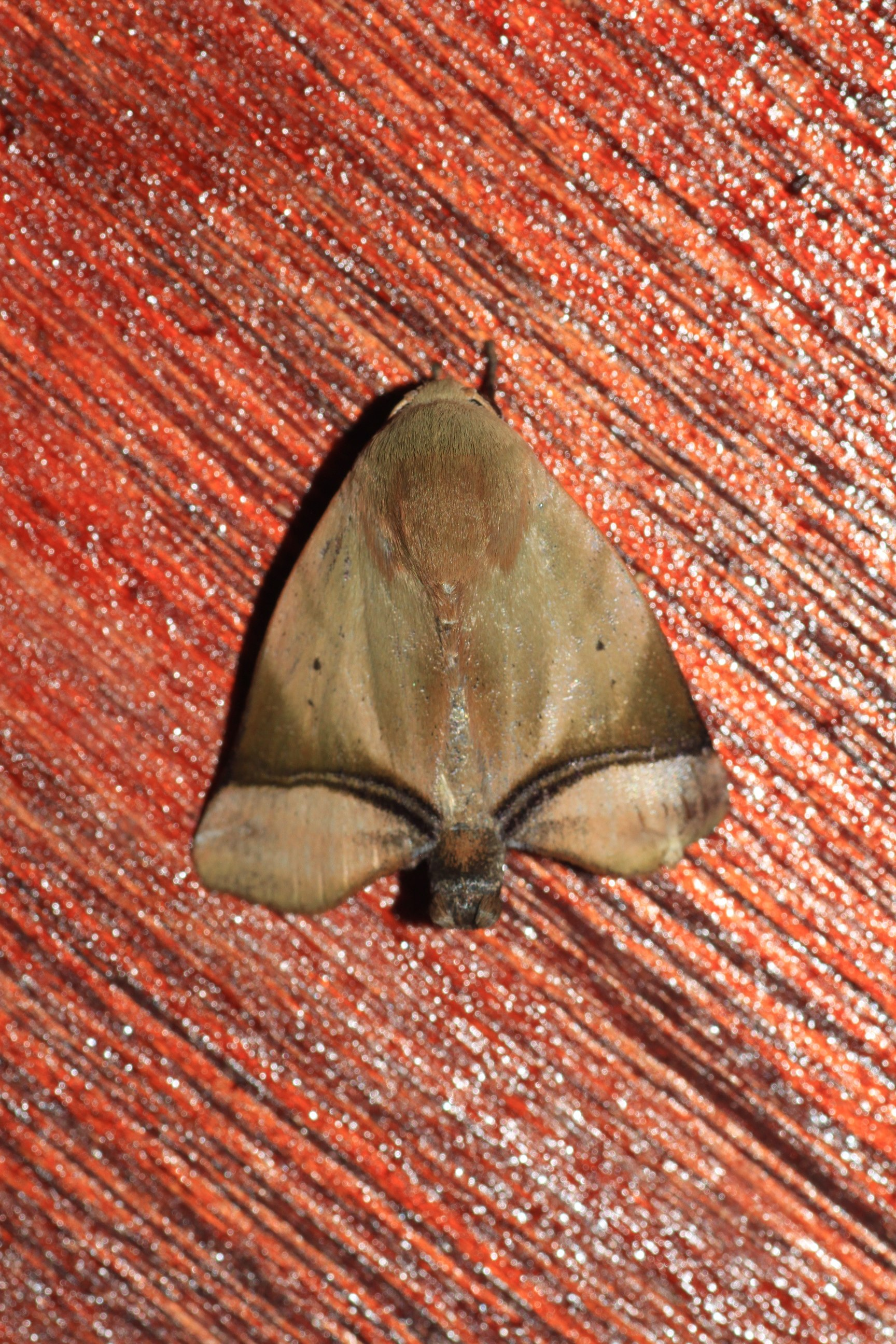
