= C. hirsuta =

C. hirsuta may refer to:

- Campomanesia hirsuta, a plant species endemic to Brazil
- Canephora hirsuta, a moth species found in Europe
- Cardamine hirsuta, the hairy bittercress, a winter annual plant species native to Europe and Asia

== See also ==
- Hirsuta
