= Lamprosoma cambuci =

Scientific classification
- Kingdom: Animalia
- Phylum: Arthropoda
- Clade: Pancrustacea
- Class: Insecta
- Order: Coleoptera
- Suborder: Polyphaga
- Infraorder: Cucujiformia
- Family: Chrysomelidae
- Genus: Lamprosoma
- Species: L. cambuci

Binomial name
- Lamprosoma cambuci Santos, Jorge, Fianco, Sampaio, Martins, Rafael, Paladini & Zarbin, 2026

Species of beetle

Lamprosoma cambuci is a species of beetle of the family Chrysomelidae. It is found in Brazil (Minas Gerais).

== Description ==
They have an oval, dorsally strongly convex body (but flat ventrally). The head, pronotum and elytra are lead blue, with violaceous reflections. The ventral surface, including legs and abdomen, is dark blue. The elytra have ten rows of punctures extending from the base to the apex, where they merge. In dorsal view, only eight rows are visible. Each puncture has a short, yellowish hair.

== Life history ==
The recorded host plant is Campomanesia phaea. They are preyed upon by an undetermined wasp species belonging to the Brasema genus.

== Etymology ==
The species name is derived from the common name of the host plant.
