= Campomanesia laurifolia =

Conservation status
- Least Concern (IUCN 3.1)

Scientific classification
- Kingdom: Plantae
- Clade: Tracheophytes
- Clade: Angiosperms
- Clade: Eudicots
- Clade: Rosids
- Order: Myrtales
- Family: Myrtaceae
- Genus: Campomanesia
- Species: C. laurifolia

Binomial name
- Campomanesia laurifolia Gardner

Species of flowering plant

Campomanesia laurifolia is a species of flowering plant in the myrtle family, Myrtaceae. It is endemic to Atlantic Forest habitats in Rio de Janeiro state of southeastern Brazil. It is a Least concern species on the IUCN Red List, and is threatened by habitat loss.
