= Oomorphus floridanus =

Scientific classification
- Kingdom: Animalia
- Phylum: Arthropoda
- Clade: Pancrustacea
- Class: Insecta
- Order: Coleoptera
- Suborder: Polyphaga
- Infraorder: Cucujiformia
- Family: Chrysomelidae
- Genus: Oomorphus
- Species: O. floridanus

Binomial name
- Oomorphus floridanus Horn, 1893

Species of beetle

Oomorphus floridanus is a species of leaf beetle in the family Chrysomelidae. It is found in the Caribbean and North America. It can be found in the foliage of young pine trees. It is known to engage in coprophagy, feeding on Neotoma floridana excreta.
