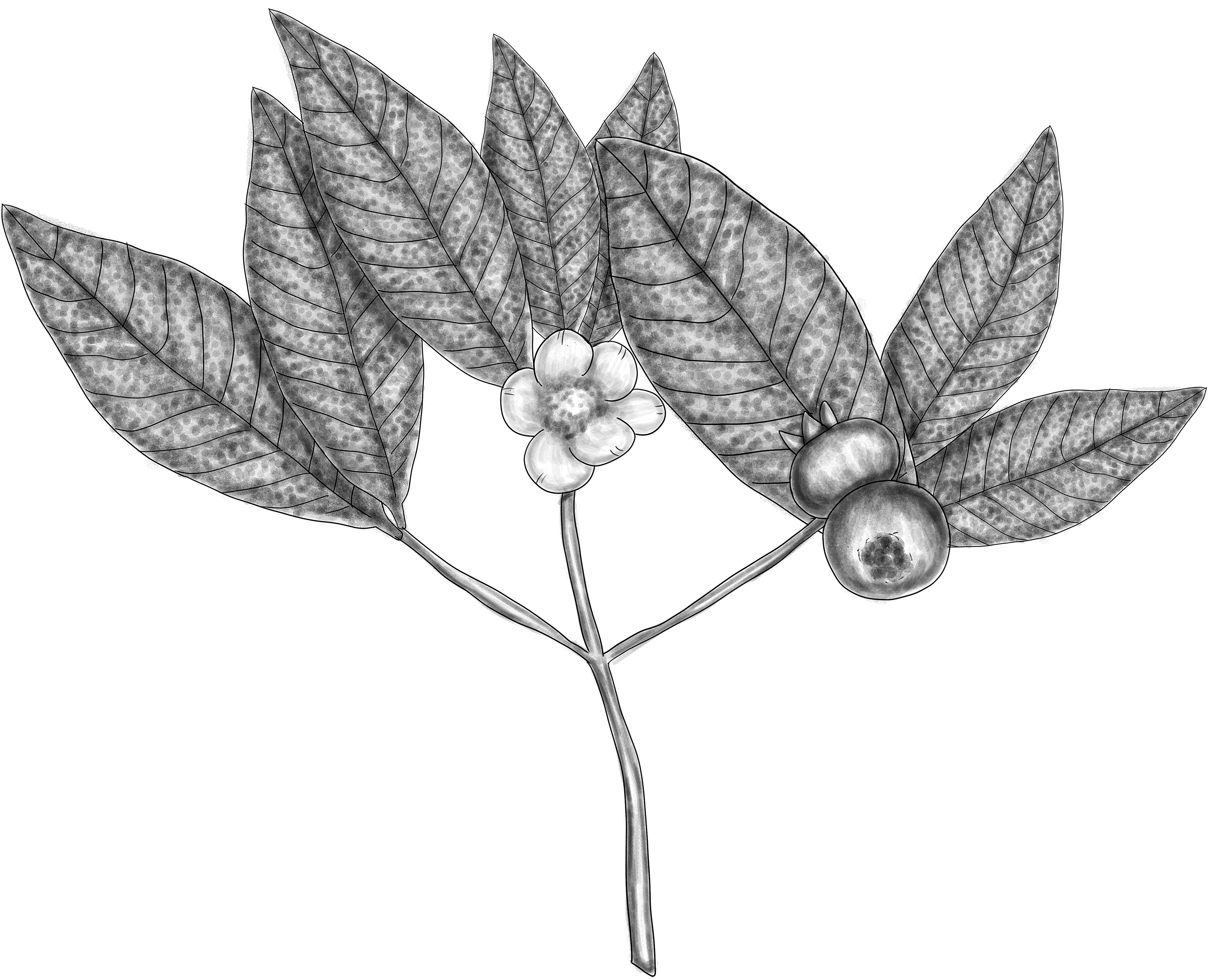

Conservation status
- Least Concern (IUCN 3.1)

Scientific classification
- Kingdom: Plantae
- Clade: Tracheophytes
- Clade: Angiosperms
- Clade: Eudicots
- Clade: Rosids
- Order: Myrtales
- Family: Myrtaceae
- Genus: Campomanesia
- Species: C. guazumifolia

Binomial name
- Campomanesia guazumifolia (Cambess.) O.Berg

Synonyms
- Abbevillea rugosa O.Berg; Britoa guazumifolia (Cambess.) D.Legrand; Britoa hassleriana Barb.Rodr.; Britoa sellowiana O.Berg; Campomanesia albiflora Rojas Acosta; Campomanesia guazumifolia var. grisea (Cambess.) O.Berg; Campomanesia guazumifolia var. rubiginosa O.Berg; Campomanesia itanarensis Kiaersk.; Lacerdaea luschnathiana O.Berg; Psidium apysa Parodi; Psidium guazumifolium Cambess.; Psidium guazumifolium var. griseum Cambess.

= Campomanesia guazumifolia =

Species of tree

Campomanesia guazumifolia is a species of tree in the family Myrtaceae.

The species is ecologically important and has the possibility to be exploited by food and medical companies.

== Names ==
Fruit in Paraná, Brazil.

In Portuguese the species goes by the common name Sete capotes. The species is popularly called seven capotes, seven capes, capoteira, seven jackets, arázeiro, and araça.

== Occurrence ==
The species is native to northeastern Argentina, eastern, southern, and west-central Brazil, Paraguay, and Uruguay. It is a characteristic species in Espírito Santo.

The species occurs in low elevation seasonal forests. It is also abundant in the Caatinga, Cerrado, and Atlantic Forest Biomes.
