= Lamprosoma =

Scientific classification
- Kingdom: Animalia
- Phylum: Arthropoda
- Clade: Pancrustacea
- Class: Insecta
- Order: Coleoptera
- Suborder: Polyphaga
- Infraorder: Cucujiformia
- Family: Chrysomelidae
- Subfamily: Lamprosomatinae
- Tribe: Lamprosomatini
- Genus: Lamprosoma; Kirby, 1819

Type species
- Lamprosoma bicolor Kirby, 1819

Synonyms
- Phenareta Gistel, 1848

Genus of beetles

Lamprosoma is a genus of beetles belonging to the family Chrysomelidae.

== Species ==
- Lamprosoma acaciae Monrós, 1948
- Lamprosoma alacre Caxambu & Almeida, 2003
- Lamprosoma amethystinum Perty, 1832
- Lamprosoma angustata Jacoby, 1908
- Lamprosoma armatum Baly, 1877
- Lamprosoma assamensis Jacoby, 1908
- Lamprosoma aurosum Lacordaire, 1848
- Lamprosoma azureum Germar, 1824
- Lamprosoma bicolor Kirby, 1819
- Lamprosoma cambuci Santos, Jorge, Fianco, Sampaio, Martins, Rafael, Paladini & Zarbin, 2026
- Lamprosoma ceylonensis Jacoby, 1908
- Lamprosoma chorisiae Monrós, 1948
- Lamprosoma chrysocyaneum Lacordaire, 1848
- Lamprosoma chrysopygium Germar, 1824
- Lamprosoma corruscum Guérin-Méneville, 1844
- Lamprosoma cupricolle Lacordaire, 1848
- Lamprosoma dives Lacordaire, 1848
- Lamprosoma indigaceum Monrós, 1947
- Lamprosoma minimum Monrós, 1948
- Lamprosoma nilgiriensis Jacoby, 1908
- Lamprosoma podtiaguini Monrós, 1947
- Lamprosoma pretiosum Lacordaire, 1848
- Lamprosoma subnitidum Monrós, 1948
- Lamprosoma triste Guérin-Ménéville, 1844
- Lamprosoma trochilus Lacordaire, 1848
- Lamprosoma zariateguii Monrós, 1947
