= Campomanesia rufa =

Conservation status
- Least Concern (IUCN 3.1)

Scientific classification
- Kingdom: Plantae
- Clade: Tracheophytes
- Clade: Angiosperms
- Clade: Eudicots
- Clade: Rosids
- Order: Myrtales
- Family: Myrtaceae
- Genus: Campomanesia
- Species: C. rufa

Binomial name
- Campomanesia rufa (O.Berg) Nied.

Synonyms
- Abbevillea rufa O.Berg

Species of flowering plant

Campomanesia rufa is a species of flowering plant in the family Myrtaceae. It is a shrub endemic to central Brazil.
