= Campomanesia neriiflora =

Conservation status
- Least Concern (IUCN 3.1)

Scientific classification
- Kingdom: Plantae
- Clade: Tracheophytes
- Clade: Angiosperms
- Clade: Eudicots
- Clade: Rosids
- Order: Myrtales
- Family: Myrtaceae
- Genus: Campomanesia
- Species: C. neriiflora

Binomial name
- Campomanesia neriiflora (O.Berg) Nied.

Synonyms
- Abbevillea neriiflora O.Berg; Acrandra verrucosa O.Berg; Campomanesia verrucosa (O.Berg) Mattos

Species of flowering plant

Campomanesia neriiflora is a species of flowering plant in the family Myrtaceae. It is a shrub or tree endemic to southeastern and southern Brazil. It is threatened by habitat loss.
