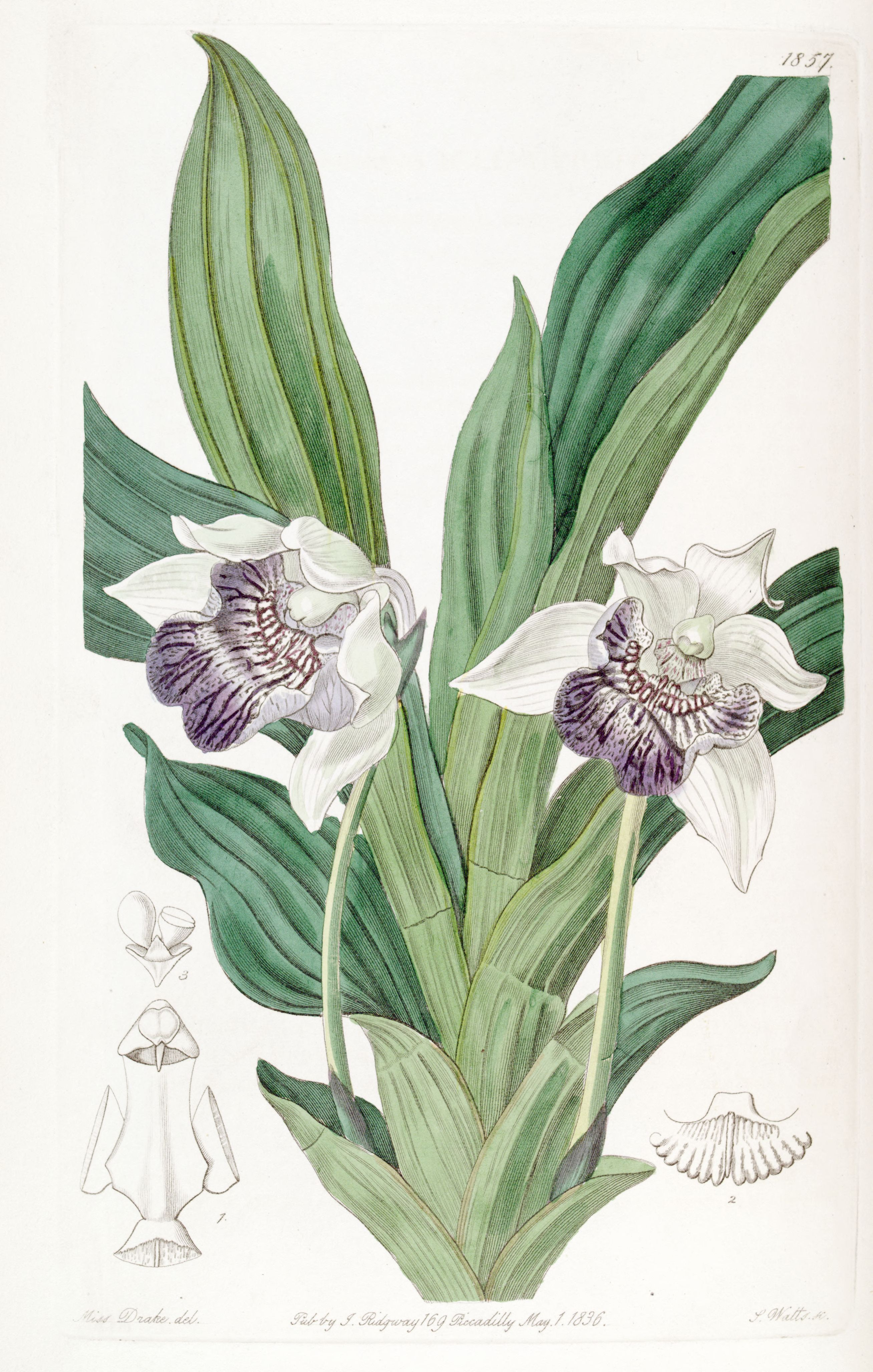

Scientific classification
- Kingdom: Plantae
- Clade: Tracheophytes
- Clade: Angiosperms
- Clade: Monocots
- Order: Asparagales
- Family: Orchidaceae
- Subfamily: Epidendroideae
- Genus: Cochleanthes
- Species: C. flabelliformis

Binomial name
- Cochleanthes flabelliformis (Sw.) R.E. Schult. & Garay (1959)

Synonyms
- Epidendrum flabelliforme Sw. (1788) (Basionym); Chondrorhyncha flabelliformis (Sw.) Alain (1962); Cochleanthes fragrans Raf. (1837); Cymbidium flabelliforme (Sw.) Sw. (1799); Epidendrum flabelliforme Sw. (1788); Huntleya imbricata Rchb.f. (1852); Warczewiczella cochlearis (Lindl.) Rchb.f. (1852); Warczewiczella cochleata Barb.Rodr. (1883); Warczewiczella flabelliformis (Sw.) Cogn. (1903); Warczewiczella gibeziae (N.E.Br.) Stein (1892); Zygopetalum cochleare Lindl. (1836); Zygopetalum cochleatum Paxton (1838); Zygopetalum conchaceum Hoffmanns. ex Rchb.f. (1863); Zygopetalum flabelliforme (Sw.) Rchb.f. (1863); Zygopetalum gibeziae N.E.Br. (1888)

= Cochleanthes flabelliformis =

Species of orchid

Cochleanthes flabelliformis is a species of orchid and the type species of the genus Cochleanthes.
