= Lychnophaes =

Scientific classification
- Kingdom: Animalia
- Phylum: Arthropoda
- Clade: Pancrustacea
- Class: Insecta
- Order: Coleoptera
- Suborder: Polyphaga
- Infraorder: Cucujiformia
- Family: Chrysomelidae
- Subfamily: Lamprosomatinae
- Tribe: Lamprosomatini
- Genus: Lychnophaes; Lacordaire, 1848

Genus of beetles

Lychnophaes is a genus of beetles belonging to the family Chrysomelidae.

== Species ==
- Lychnophaes cornuta Lacordaire, 1848
- Lychnophaes cyaniceps Lacordaire, 1848
- Lychnophaes empyreus Lacordaire, 1848
- Lychnophaes globosa (Olivier, 1791)
- Lychnophaes hypochrysa Lacordaire, 1848
- Lychnophaes imbirucu Santos, Jorge, Fianco, Sampaio, Martins, Rafael, Paladini & Zarbin, 2026
- Lychnophaes laticollis Lacordaire, 1848
- Lychnophaes pilula Lacordaire, 1848
- Lychnophaes principalis Lacordaire, 1848
