= Campomanesia speciosa =

Conservation status
- Least Concern (IUCN 3.1)

Scientific classification
- Kingdom: Plantae
- Clade: Tracheophytes
- Clade: Angiosperms
- Clade: Eudicots
- Clade: Rosids
- Order: Myrtales
- Family: Myrtaceae
- Genus: Campomanesia
- Species: C. speciosa

Binomial name
- Campomanesia speciosa (Diels) McVaugh

Synonyms
- Psidium speciosum Diels

Species of tree

Campomanesia speciosa is a species of flowering plant in the family Myrtaceae. It is endemic to the Amazon basin in eastern Peru and Acre (state) of Brazil. It is threatened by habitat loss.
