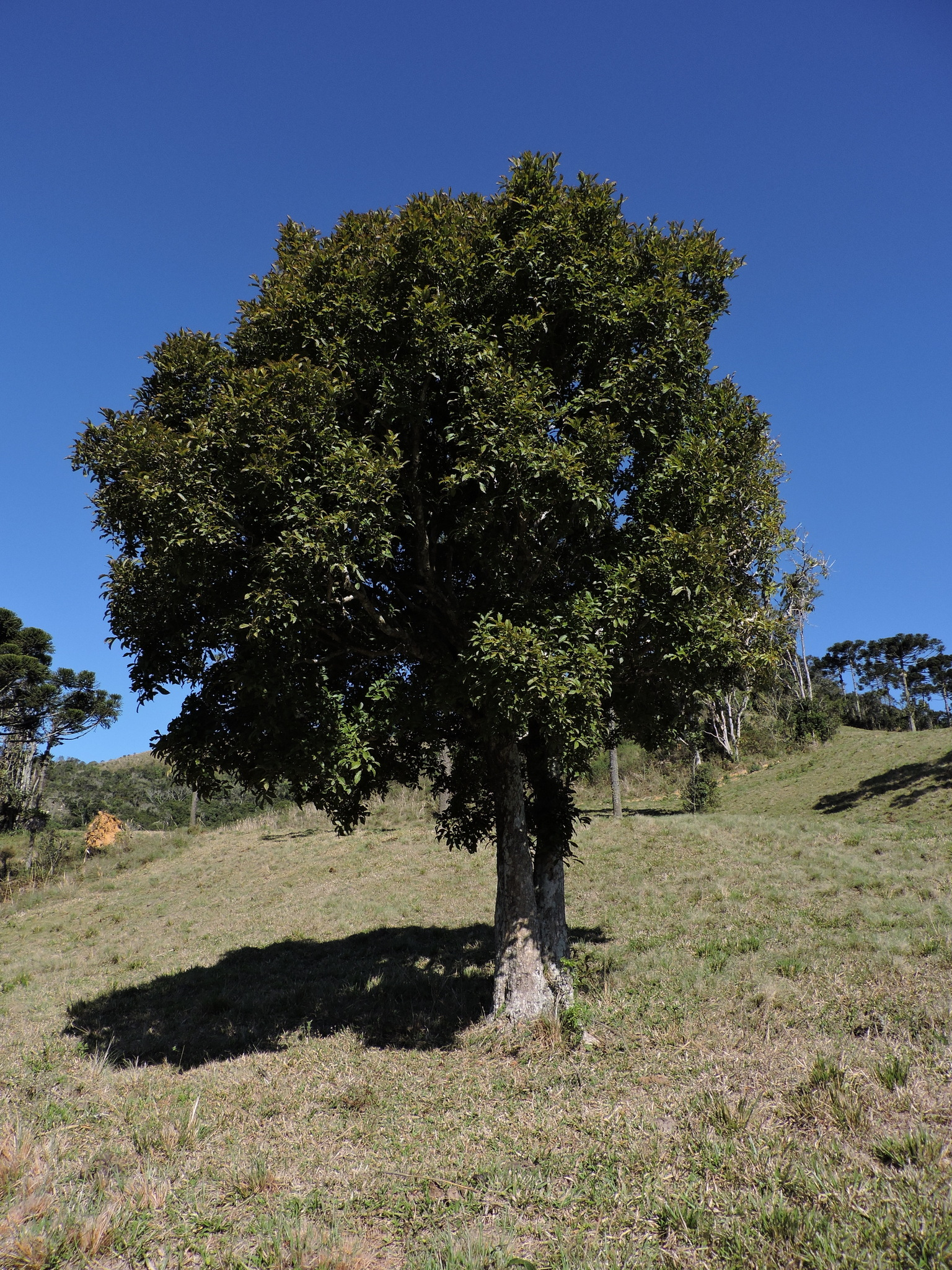

Conservation status
- Near Threatened (IUCN 3.1)

Scientific classification
- Kingdom: Plantae
- Clade: Tracheophytes
- Clade: Angiosperms
- Clade: Eudicots
- Clade: Rosids
- Order: Myrtales
- Family: Myrtaceae
- Genus: Campomanesia
- Species: C. reitziana

Binomial name
- Campomanesia reitziana D.Legrand

= Campomanesia reitziana =

Species of flowering plant

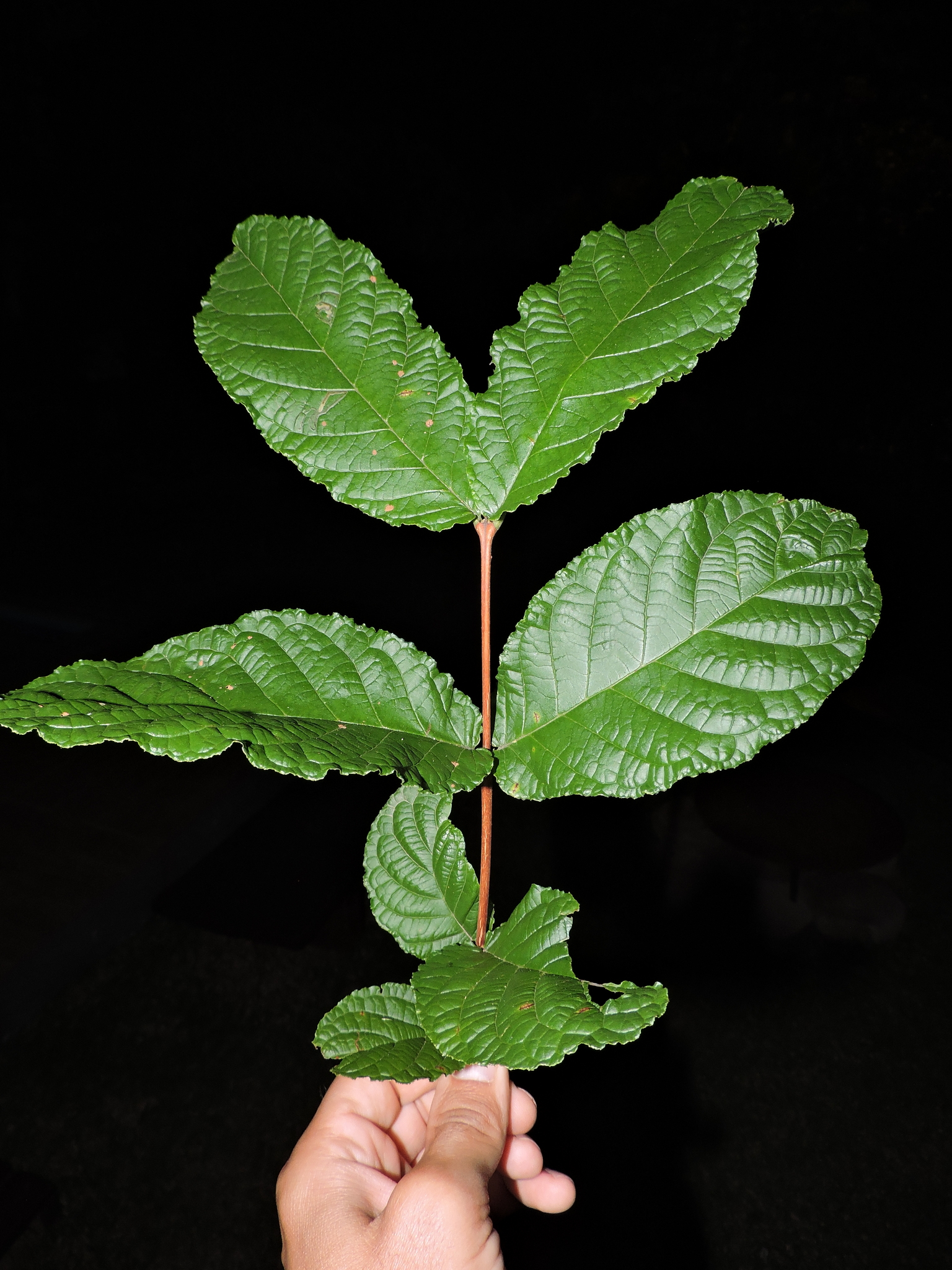
Leaves of Campomanesia reitziana.

Campomanesia reitziana is a species of flowering plant in the family Myrtaceae. It is a shrub or tree endemic to southern and southeastern Brazil. It is threatened by habitat loss.
