= Lychnophaes imbirucu =

- Male
- Females (variation)

Scientific classification
- Kingdom: Animalia
- Phylum: Arthropoda
- Clade: Pancrustacea
- Class: Insecta
- Order: Coleoptera
- Suborder: Polyphaga
- Infraorder: Cucujiformia
- Family: Chrysomelidae
- Genus: Lychnophaes
- Species: L. imbirucu

Binomial name
- Lychnophaes imbirucu Santos, Jorge, Fianco, Sampaio, Martins, Rafael, Paladini & Zarbin, 2026

Species of beetle

Lychnophaes imbirucu is a species of beetle of the family Chrysomelidae. It is found in Brazil (Paraná).

== Description ==
They have an oval, dorsally strongly convex body (but flat ventrally). In males, the head and pronotum are coppery with yellowish green reflections and the elytra are cyan with green reflections. The ventral surface, including abdomen, is dark blue and the legs are cyan (except for the anterior femur which has green reflections). Females are similar to males, but lack the metallic green spot on the profemur. Entirely coppery females with reddish reflections also occor (instead of having blue elytra).

== Life history ==
The recorded host plant is Pseudobombax grandiflorum.

== Etymology ==
The species name is derived from the common name of the host plant.
