= Camptosomata =

Scientific classification
- Kingdom: Animalia
- Phylum: Arthropoda
- Class: Insecta
- Order: Coleoptera
- Suborder: Polyphaga
- Infraorder: Cucujiformia
- Family: Chrysomelidae
- (unranked): Camptosomata

Subfamilies
- Cryptocephalinae; Lamprosomatinae

Case-bearing leaf beetles

Camptosomata are the case-bearing leaf beetles or camptosomates, named for their larval habit of carrying a case of waste material. This group consists of two subfamilies of Chrysomelidae (leaf beetles): Lamprosomatinae and Cryptocephalinae (which include the former Chlamisinae and Clytrinae).

Each case begins as a wrapping that the mother creates by laying plates of fecal material around each egg. She begins at one end of the egg and turns it with the addition of each plate. She then closes it by creating a "roof" at the other end. When the larva hatches from the egg, it opens the roof of the egg case. it then extends it head and legs from this opening, flips the case over its back and crawls away. Larval camptosomates add to and expand this case with their own waste materials as they grow. They eventually seal off the opening where their head and legs were and pupate inside. When they metamorphose into adults, these beetles then cut a circle around the apex of the case, pop off the cap, and crawl out, ready to feed, mate, and start the cycle over again.

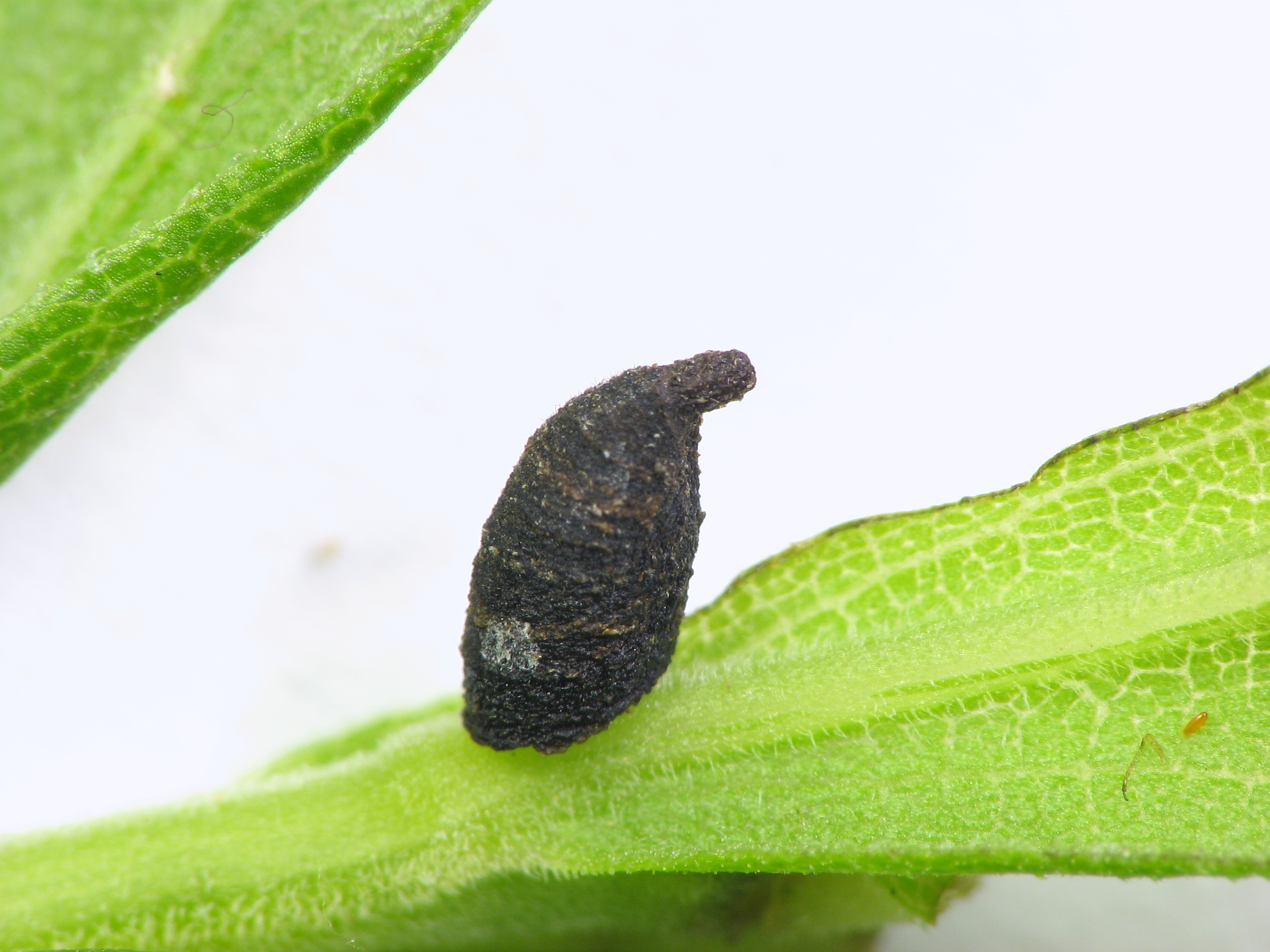
Exema larval case

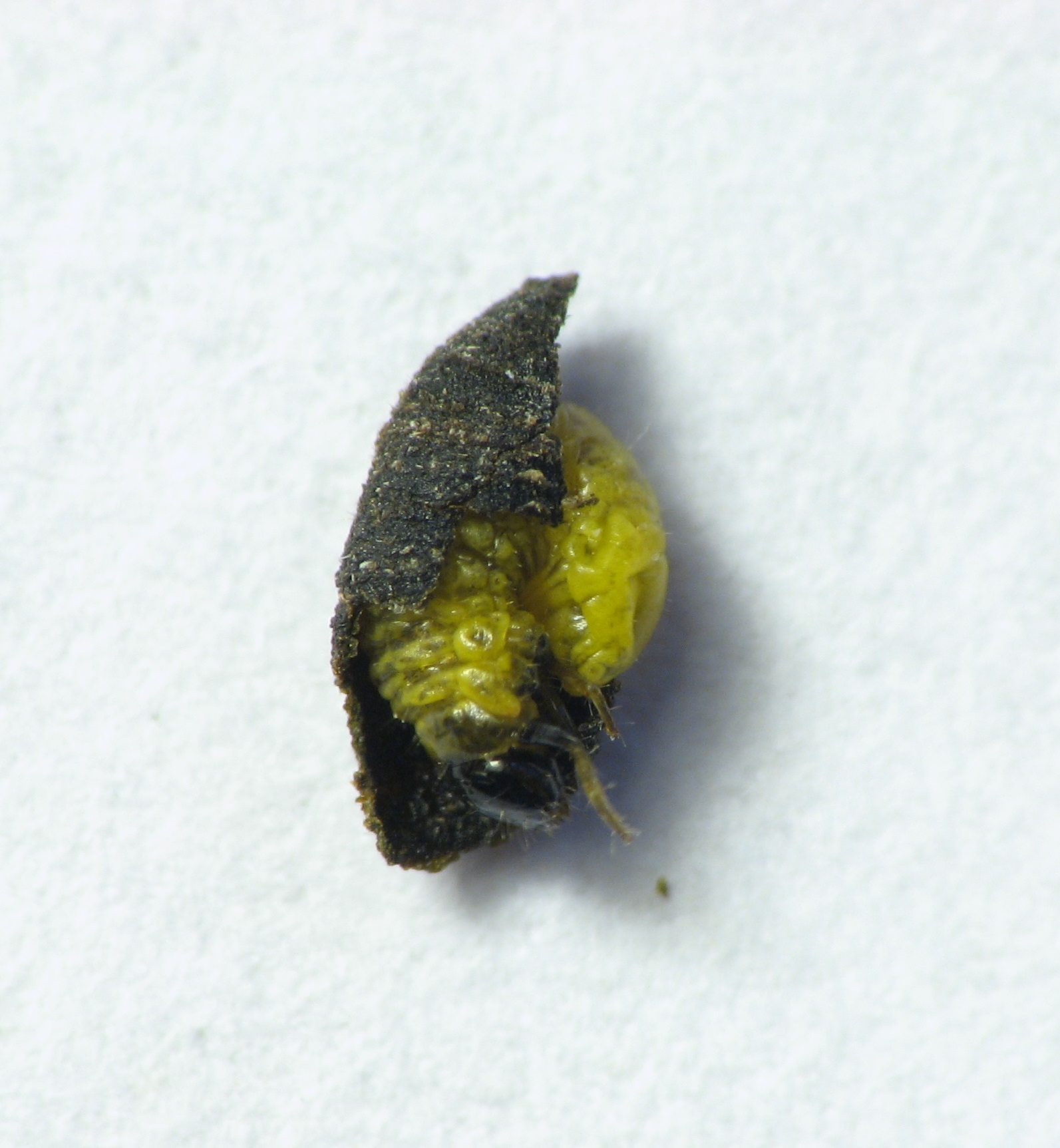
Exema larva

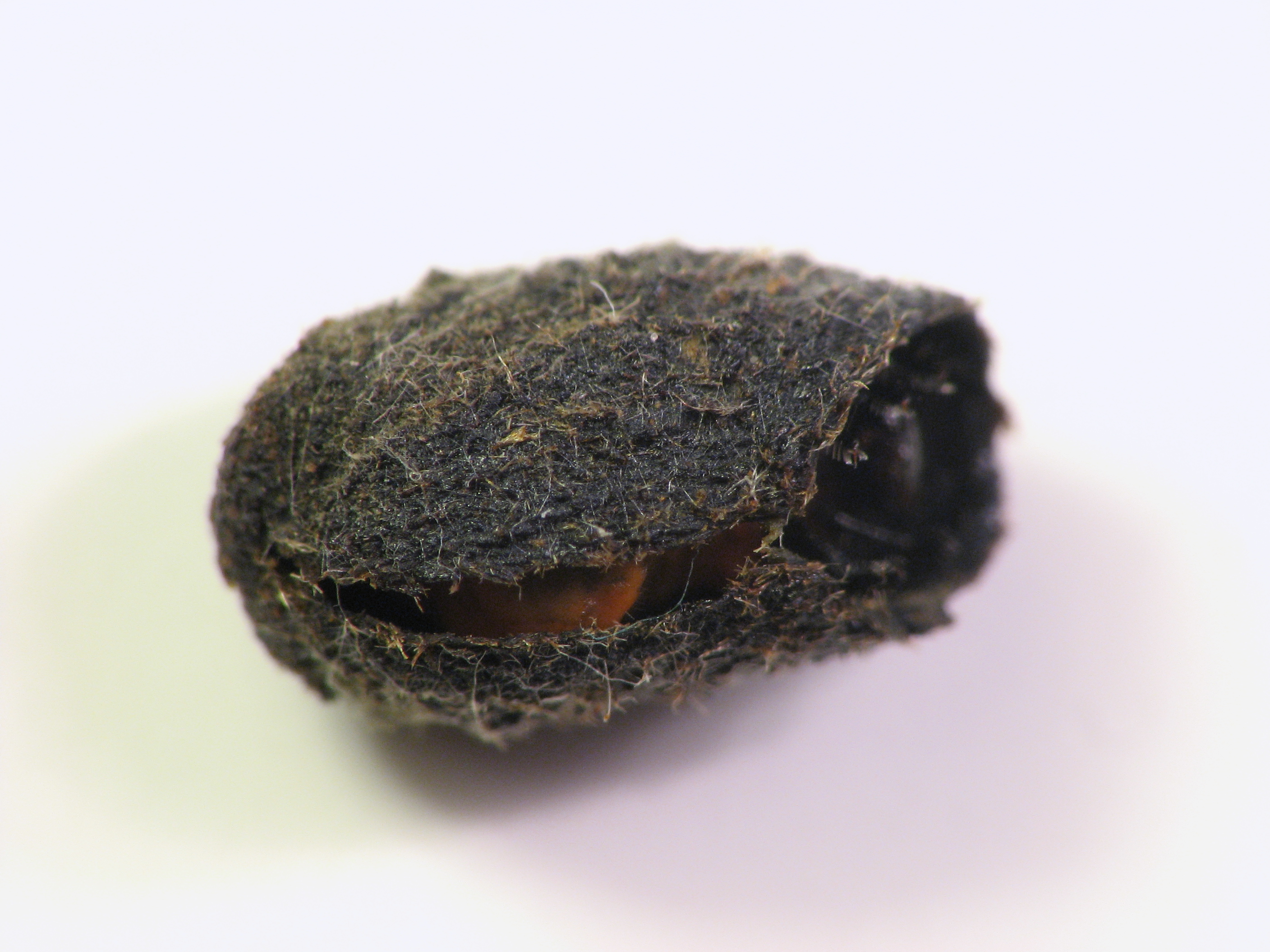
Neochlamisus larval case

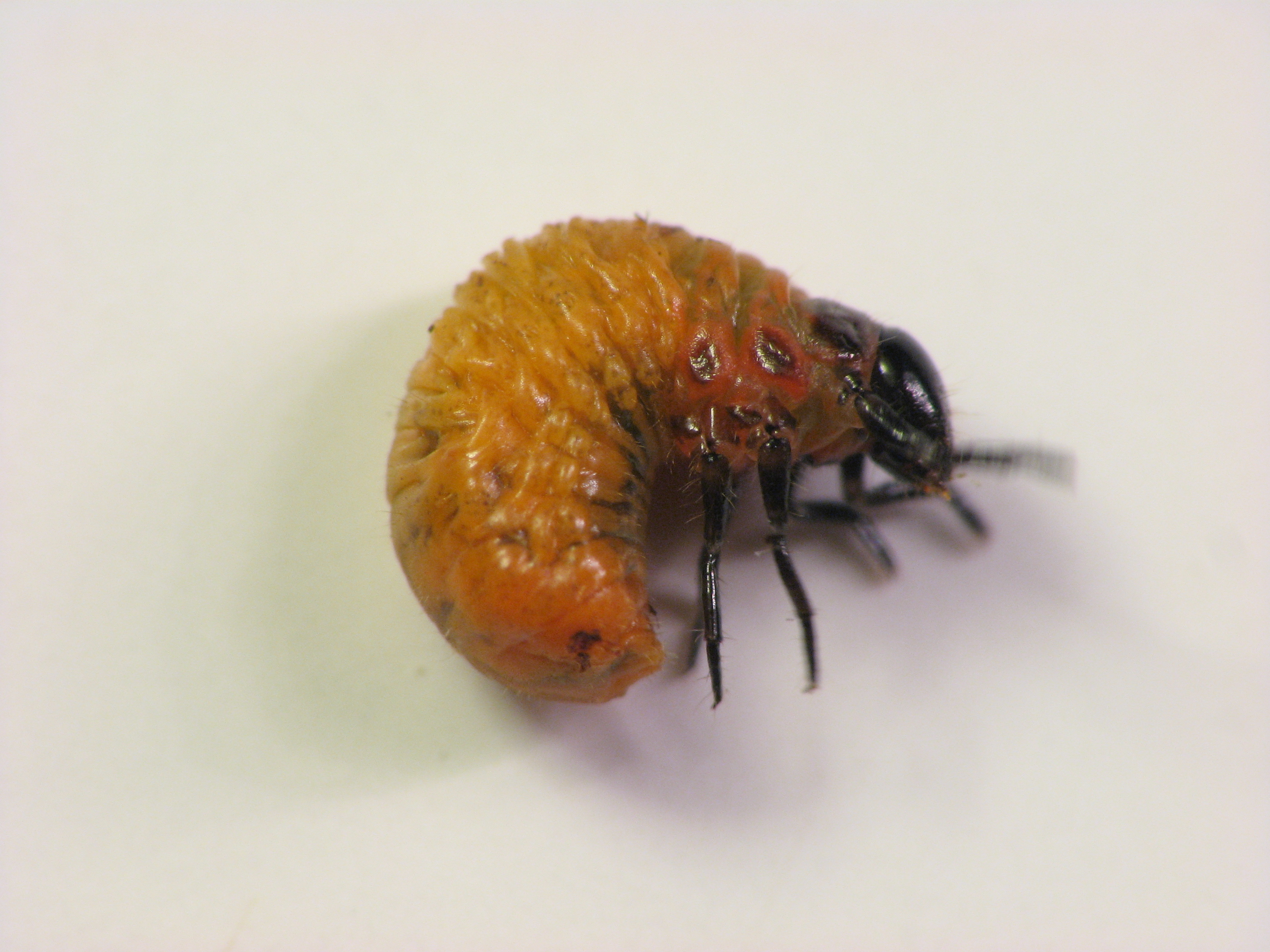
Neochlamisus larva removed from fecal case
