= Campomanesia espiritosantensis =

Conservation status
- Endangered (IUCN 3.1)

Scientific classification
- Kingdom: Plantae
- Clade: Tracheophytes
- Clade: Angiosperms
- Clade: Eudicots
- Clade: Rosids
- Order: Myrtales
- Family: Myrtaceae
- Genus: Campomanesia
- Species: C. espiritosantensis

Binomial name
- Campomanesia espiritosantensis Landrum

Species of flowering plant

Campomanesia espiritosantensis is a species of flowering plant in the family Myrtaceae. It is a tree endemic to southeastern Brazil, including in the Atlantic Forest ecoregion.
