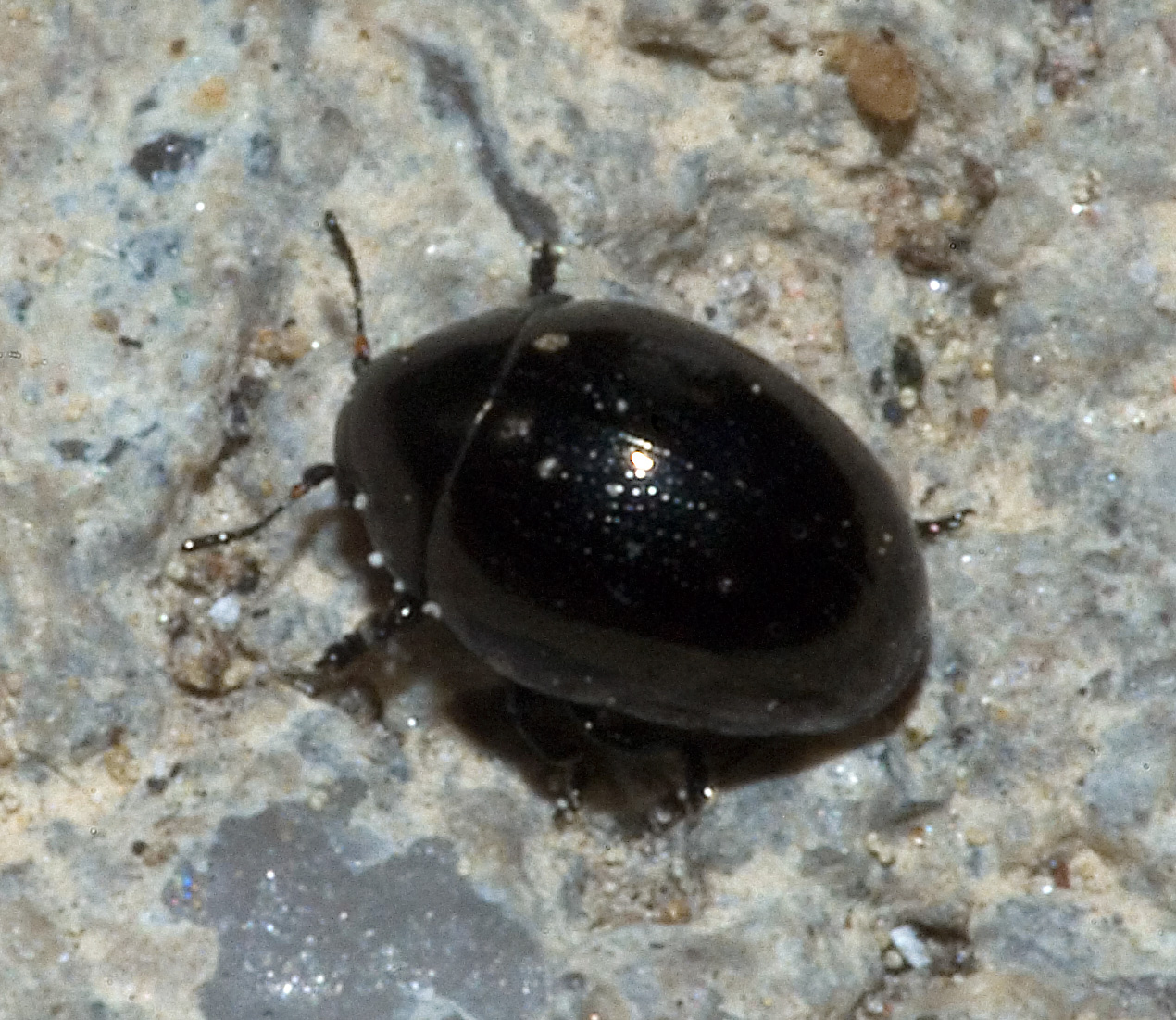
- Oomorphus concolor

Scientific classification
- Kingdom: Animalia
- Phylum: Arthropoda
- Clade: Pancrustacea
- Class: Insecta
- Order: Coleoptera
- Suborder: Polyphaga
- Infraorder: Cucujiformia
- Family: Chrysomelidae
- (unranked): Camptosomata
- Subfamily: Lamprosomatinae; Lacordaire, 1848

Tribes
- Cachiporrini; Lamprosomatini; Neochlamysini; Sphaerocharini

= Lamprosomatinae =

Subfamily of leaf beetles

The Lamprosomatinae are a small subfamily of leaf beetles (Chrysomelidae). They belong to the case-bearing Camptosomata.

== Tribes and genera ==
The subfamily contains 14 extant genera, and 3 extinct genera, in four tribes:

Tribe Cachiporrini Chamorro & Konstantinov, 2011:

- Cachiporra Chamorro & Konstantinov, 2011

Tribe Lamprosomatini Lacordaire, 1848:

- †Archelamprosomius Bukejs & Nadein, 2015
- Asisia Bezděk, Löbl & Konstantinov, 2010 (replacement name for Guggenheimia Monrós, 1956)
- †Damzenius Bukejs, 2019
- Dorisina Monrós, 1956
- Lamprosoma Kirby, 1819
- Lamprosomoides Monrós, 1958
- Lychnophaes Lacordaire, 1848
- Oomorphoides Monrós, 1956
- Oomorphus Curtis, 1831
- Oyarzuna Bechyné, 1950
- Scrophoomorphus Medvedev, 1968
- †Succinoomorphus Bukejs & Nadein, 2015
- Xenoomorphus Monrós, 1956

Tribe Neochlamysini Monrós, 1959:

- Neochlamys Jacoby, 1882
- Pseudolychnophaes Achard, 1914

Tribe Sphaerocharini Chapuis, 1874:

- Sphaerocharis Lacordaire, 1848
