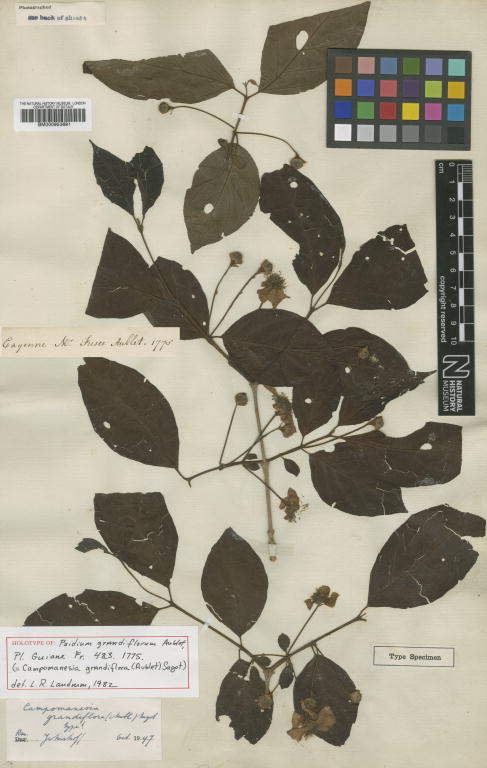

Conservation status
- Least Concern (IUCN 3.1)

Scientific classification
- Kingdom: Plantae
- Clade: Tracheophytes
- Clade: Angiosperms
- Clade: Eudicots
- Clade: Rosids
- Order: Myrtales
- Family: Myrtaceae
- Genus: Campomanesia
- Species: C. grandiflora

Binomial name
- Campomanesia grandiflora (Aubl.) Sagot

Synonyms
- Burchardia grandiflora (Aubl.) Raf.; Campomanesia poiteaui O.Berg; Psidium aromaticum var. grandiflorum (Aubl.) Pers.; Psidium grandiflorum Aubl.

= Campomanesia grandiflora =

Species of flowering plant in the myrtle family

Campomanesia grandiflora is a species of tree the flowering plant family Myrtaceae. In Portuguese the species goes by the common name Acariquara branca.

The species has a self-supporting growth form and simple, ovate leaves.

== Range ==
The species is native to northern and northeastern Brazil, French Guiana, Guyana, Suriname, and Venezuela.

== Uses ==
The species is cultivated for food in its native land.
