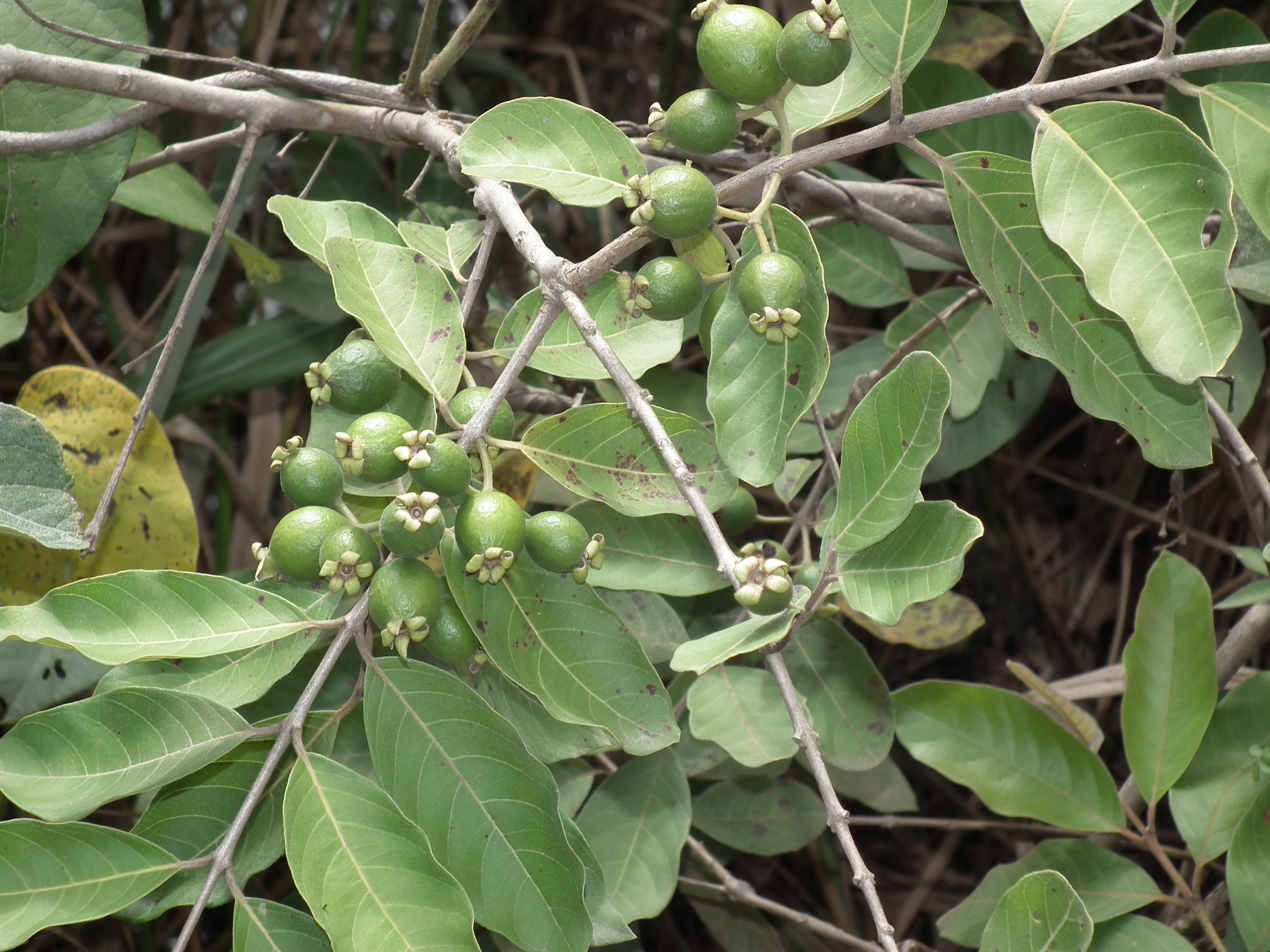

Scientific classification
- Kingdom: Plantae
- Clade: Embryophytes
- Clade: Tracheophytes
- Clade: Angiosperms
- Clade: Eudicots
- Clade: Rosids
- Order: Myrtales
- Family: Myrtaceae
- Genus: Campomanesia
- Species: C. adamantium

Binomial name
- Campomanesia adamantium (Cambess.) O.Berg

= Campomanesia adamantium =

Species of flowering plant

Campomanesia adamantium, commonly known as gabiroba, guavira, or guabiroba do campo, is a short shrub-like plant that grows no taller than 1.5 meters on average It is natively found in the central part of South America, in Paraguay and Brazil. The plant produces small yellow-green edible fruits

== Description ==
Campomanesia adamantium growth habit is a small shrub. It can grow at height of about 1.3 ft (0.4 m) to 5.9 ft (1.8 m) tall. The leaves are opposite and falsely opposite, meaning that the leaves are not perfectly aligned across from each other. The leaf type is simple with primary brochidodromous venation. C. adamantium is deciduous and the flowers are created when a new set of leaves are forming. It has solitary flowers that grows on the branches. The nonfragrant flowers are whitish cream in color. The flowers contain 5 petals with radial symmetry. It is hermaphroditic containing many stamens and 7- 9 carpels with an inferior ovary. The fruit size can be between 2 and 2.5 cm in diameter. The color of the fruit can vary from green to yellow and contains a juicy pulp with a strong citric taste

== Ecology ==
Campomanesia adamantium is a tropical shrub that grows in the Cerrado savannas of Brazil as well as parts of Paraguay. The soil found where this plant grows is acidic, poor in nutrients and drains water well. Periodic flooding of the Cerrado does not seem to pose a threat to this plant as it is able to withstand flooding. The Cerrado has an average temperature of 26-20 degrees Celsius and an average rainfall of 2000–1200 mm, with the majority of rainfall in the summer. The flower produces pollen and nectar and is pollinated in the morning by many species of insects but seems to be predominantly pollinated by bees, specifically the non-native Apis mellifera. Apis mellifera has completely dominated and prevented other native bee species from pollinating this plant. This may be a result of cutting forest area down to make space for agricultural production, or the use of pesticides on nearby cropland

== Cultivation and uses ==
The fruit is eaten by locals for its high vitamin C nutrition and its juicy sweet taste. It can also be used make treats such as ice cream, jellies, and candy. Locals believe that the plant helps with inflammation, diarrhea, urinary tract infections, and gastrointestinal disorders. The plant is effective in treating diseases because it is rich in zinc, calcium, aluminum, and potassium. Its high concentration of zinc is helpful for fighting zinc deficient illnesses like diarrhea and malnutrition. It is also rich in aluminum which is contained in many antiulcer drugs. In addition, the extracts from the leaves and fruits reveal to have antioxidant properties that prevent the spread of bacteria and fungi.
