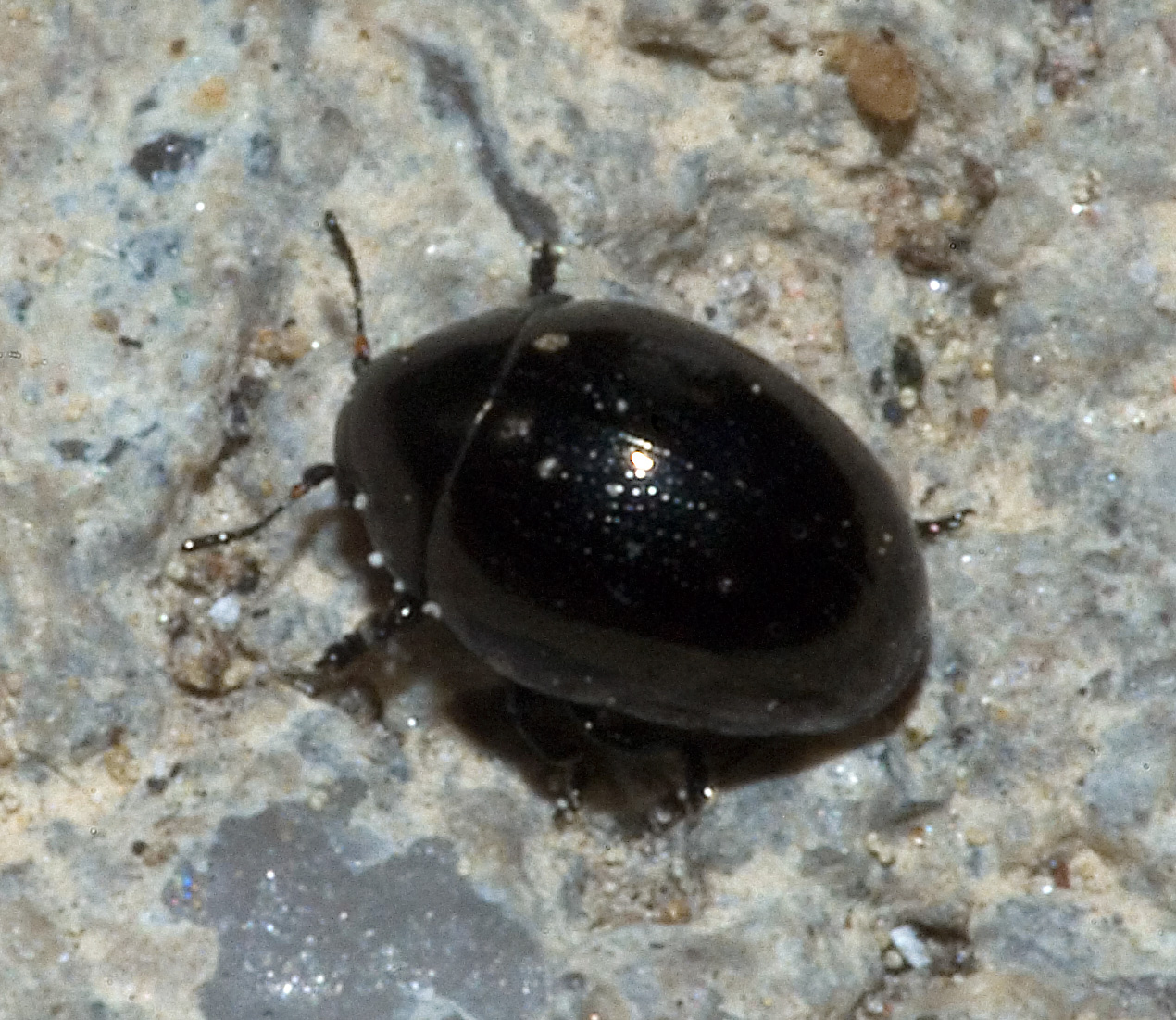
- Oomorphus concolor

Scientific classification
- Kingdom: Animalia
- Phylum: Arthropoda
- Clade: Pancrustacea
- Class: Insecta
- Order: Coleoptera
- Suborder: Polyphaga
- Infraorder: Cucujiformia
- Family: Chrysomelidae
- Subfamily: Lamprosomatinae
- Tribe: Lamprosomatini
- Genus: Oomorphus; Curtis, 1831

= Oomorphus =

Genus of beetles

Oomorphus is a genus of leaf beetles in the family Chrysomelidae. There are about 18 described species in Oomorphus.

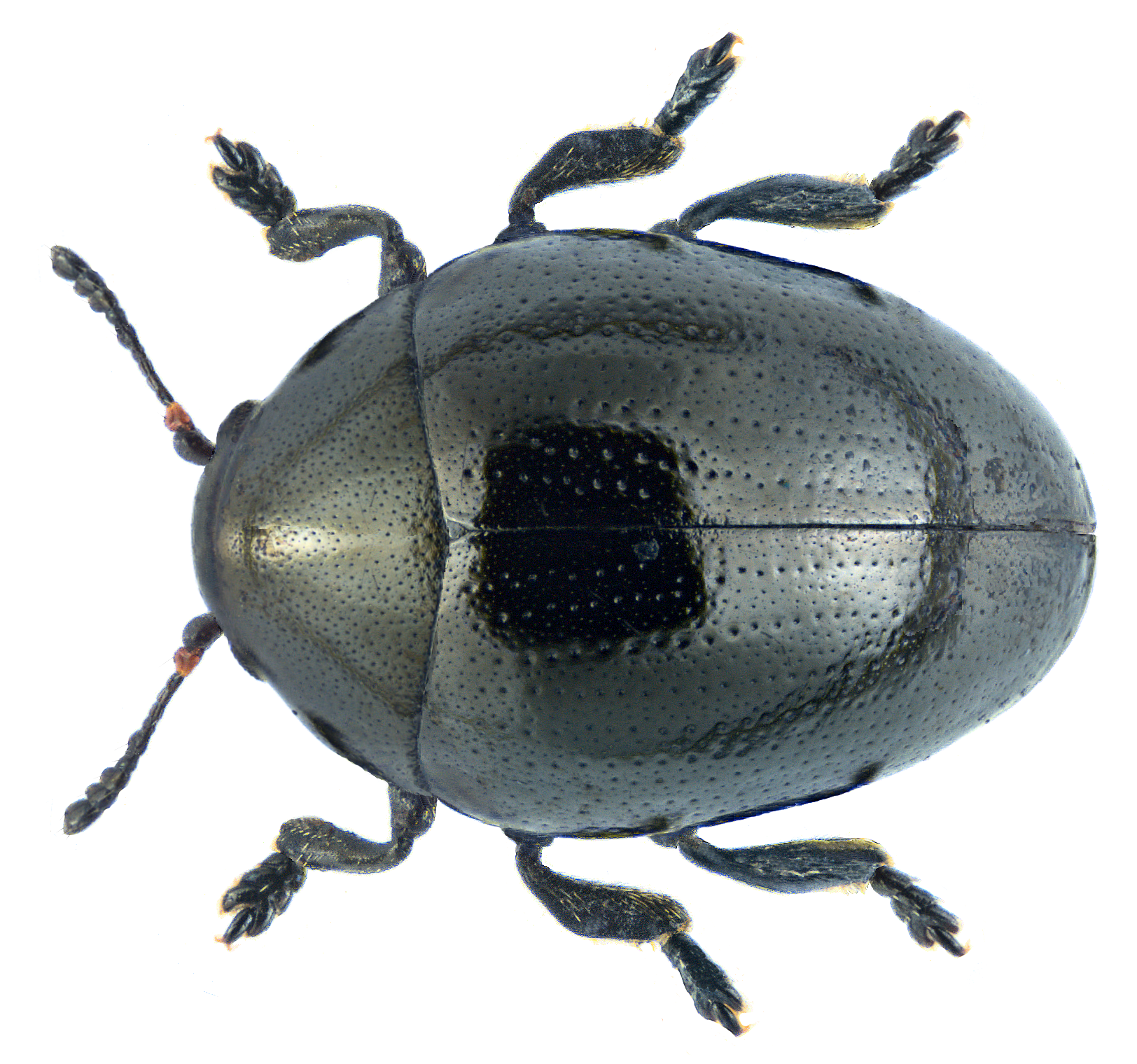
Oomorphus concolor

== Species ==
These 18 species belong to the genus Oomorphus:

- Oomorphus aenigmatica Lacordaire, 1848
- Oomorphus alvarengai Monros
- Oomorphus amazonicus Monros
- Oomorphus amethystina Perty, 1832
- Oomorphus cavisternum Lacordaire, 1848
- Oomorphus concolor (Sturm, 1807)
- Oomorphus corusca Guérin, 1844
- Oomorphus dorsalis Lacordaire, 1848
- Oomorphus floridanus Horn, 1893
- Oomorphus gibbosa Lacordaire, 1848
- Oomorphus goiasensis Monros
- Oomorphus mexicanus Jacoby, 1890
- Oomorphus minutus Jacoby, 1881
- Oomorphus olivacea Lacordaire, 1848
- Oomorphus puncticeps Lacordaire, 1848
- Oomorphus splendida Lacordaire, 1848
- Oomorphus uva Lacordaire, 1848
- Oomorphus wittmeri Monros
