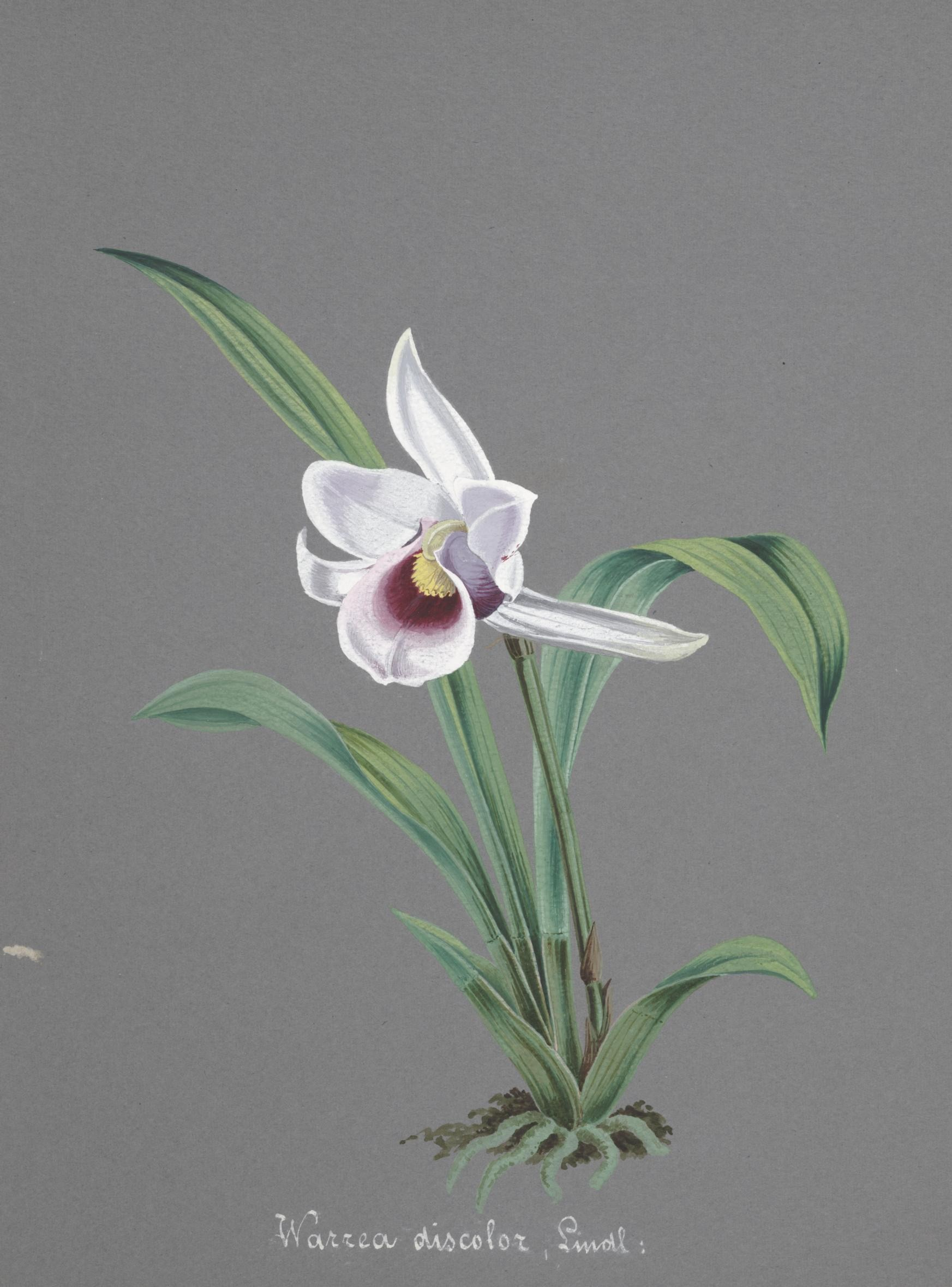
- Illustration of the type species, W. discolor.

Scientific classification
- Kingdom: Plantae
- Clade: Embryophytes
- Clade: Tracheophytes
- Clade: Spermatophytes
- Clade: Angiosperms
- Clade: Monocots
- Order: Asparagales
- Family: Orchidaceae
- Subfamily: Epidendroideae
- Tribe: Cymbidieae
- Subtribe: Zygopetalinae
- Genus: Warczewiczella; Rchb.f.

Type species
- Warczewiczella discolor (Lindl.) Rchb. f.

= Warczewiczella =

Genus of orchids

Warczewiczella is a genus of orchids native to South America, Central America, and Cuba.

- Warczewiczella amazonica Rchb.f. & Warsz. - Colombia, Ecuador, Peru, Brazil
- Warczewiczella candida (Lindl.) Rchb.f. - Brazil
- Warczewiczella discolor (Lindl.) Rchb.f. - Colombia, Ecuador, Peru, Venezuela, Cuba, Costa Rica, Honduras, Panama
- Warczewiczella guianensis (Lafontaine, G.Gerlach & Senghas) Dressler - Guyana, Suriname, French Guiana
- Warczewiczella ionoleuca (Rchb.f.) Schltr. - Colombia, Ecuador
- Warczewiczella lipscombiae (Rolfe) Fowlie - Panama
- Warczewiczella lobata (Garay) Dressler - Colombia
- Warczewiczella marginata Rchb.f. - Panama, Colombia, Venezuela
- Warczewiczella palatina (Senghas) Dressler - Peru, Bolivia
- Warczewiczella timbiensis P.Ortiz - Colombia
- Warczewiczella wailesiana (Lindl.) E.Morren - Brazil
