= Campomanesia prosthecesepala =

Conservation status
- Data Deficient (IUCN 3.1)

Scientific classification
- Kingdom: Plantae
- Clade: Tracheophytes
- Clade: Angiosperms
- Clade: Eudicots
- Clade: Rosids
- Order: Myrtales
- Family: Myrtaceae
- Genus: Campomanesia
- Species: C. prosthecesepala

Binomial name
- Campomanesia prosthecesepala Kiaerskou

Species of flowering plant

Campomanesia prosthecesepala is a species of plant in the family Myrtaceae. The plant is endemic to the Atlantic Forest ecoregion in southeastern Brazil, within Minas Gerais state.
