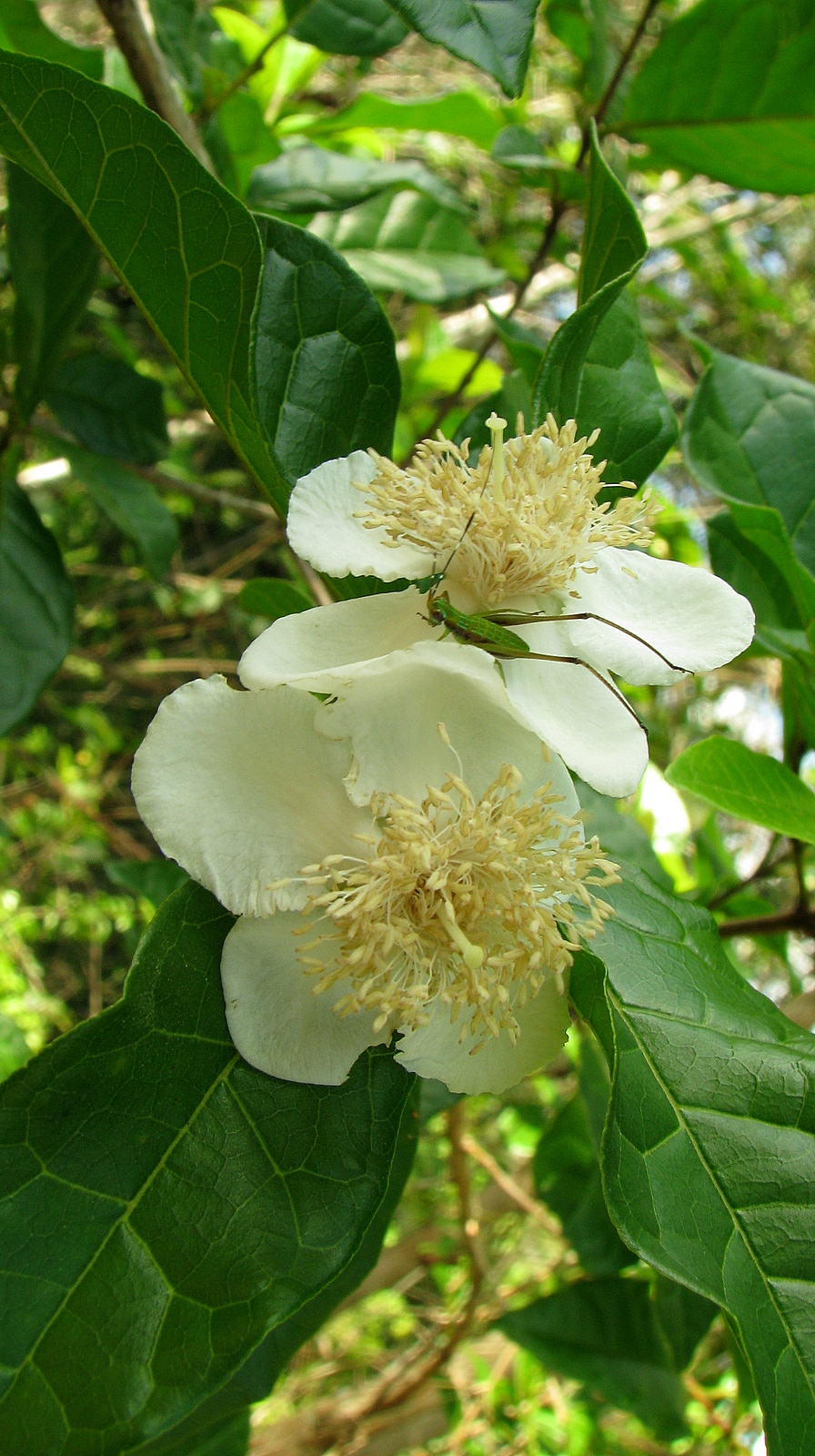

Conservation status
- Least Concern (IUCN 3.1)

Scientific classification
- Kingdom: Plantae
- Clade: Tracheophytes
- Clade: Angiosperms
- Clade: Eudicots
- Clade: Rosids
- Order: Myrtales
- Family: Myrtaceae
- Genus: Campomanesia
- Species: C. ilhoensis

Binomial name
- Campomanesia ilhoensis Mattos

Synonyms
- Abbevillea gardneriana O.Berg; Campomanesia schultziana Mattos; Campomanesia viatoris Landrum

= Campomanesia ilhoensis =

Species of flowering plant

Campomanesia ilhoensis (synonym Campomanesia viatoris) is a species of plant in the family Myrtaceae.

The plant is endemic to the Atlantic Forest ecoregion in southeastern Brazil. It is occasionally distributed on the banks of the Rio Sâo Francisco in coastal Alagoas state.
