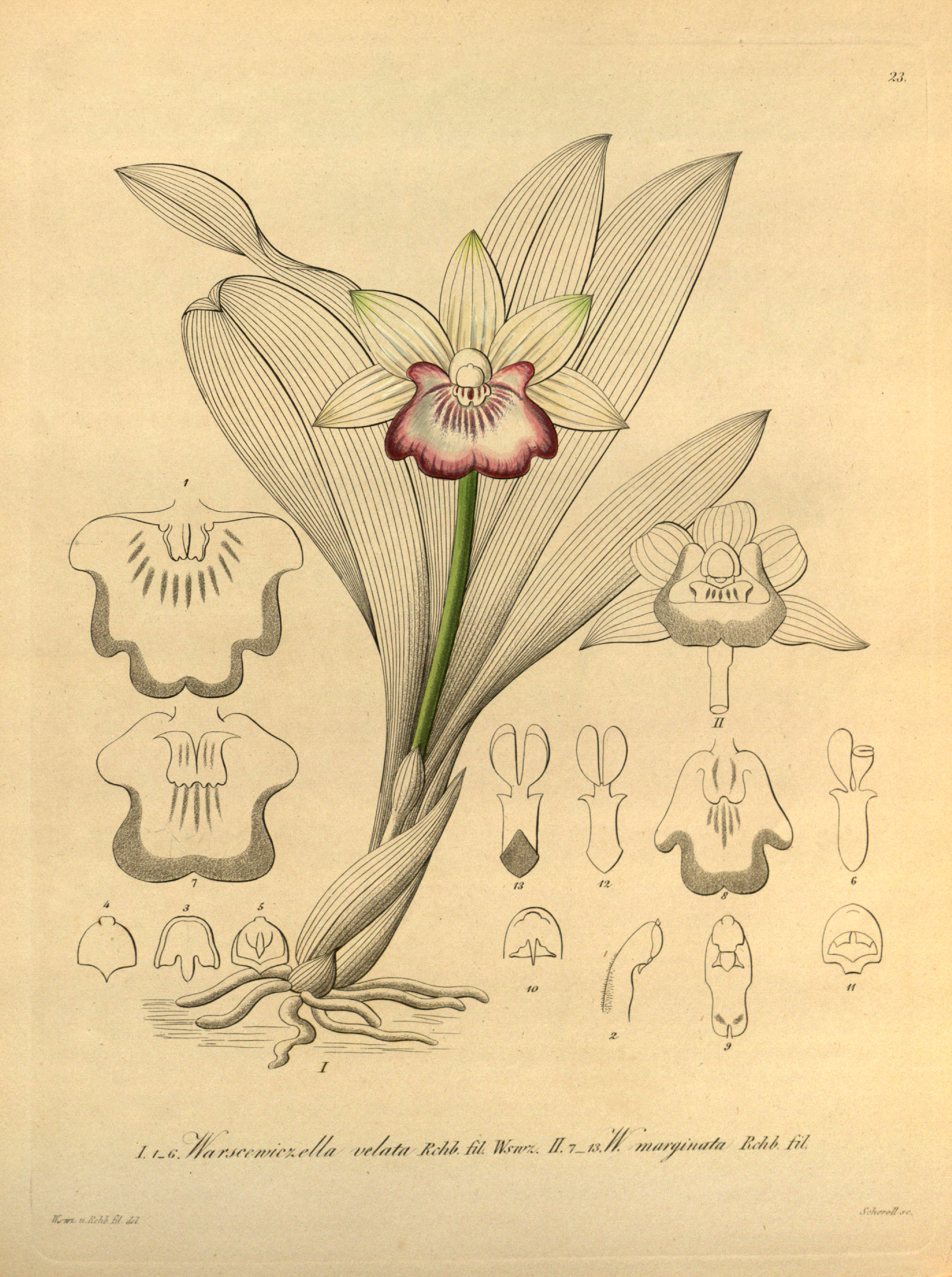
- 1858 illustration

Scientific classification
- Kingdom: Plantae
- Clade: Embryophytes
- Clade: Tracheophytes
- Clade: Spermatophytes
- Clade: Angiosperms
- Clade: Monocots
- Order: Asparagales
- Family: Orchidaceae
- Subfamily: Epidendroideae
- Genus: Warczewiczella
- Species: W. marginata

Binomial name
- Warczewiczella marginata Rchb.f.

Synonyms
- Zygopetalum marginatum (Rchb.f.) Rchb.f. in W.G.Walpers; Chondrorhyncha marginata (Rchb.f.) P.H.Allen; Cochleanthes marginata (Rchb.f.) R.E.Schult. & Garay; Zygopetalum fragrans Linden; Huntleya marginata Rchb.f.; Warrea marginata Rchb.f.; Warrea quadrata Lindl.; Warczewiczella velata Rchb.f. & Warsz.; Zygopetalum velatum (Rchb.f. & Warsz.) Rchb.f. in W.G.Walpers; Zygopetalum quadratum (Lindl.) Pfitzer

= Warczewiczella marginata =

Species of orchid

Warczewiczella marginata is a species of orchid native to Colombia, Venezuela, and Panama.
