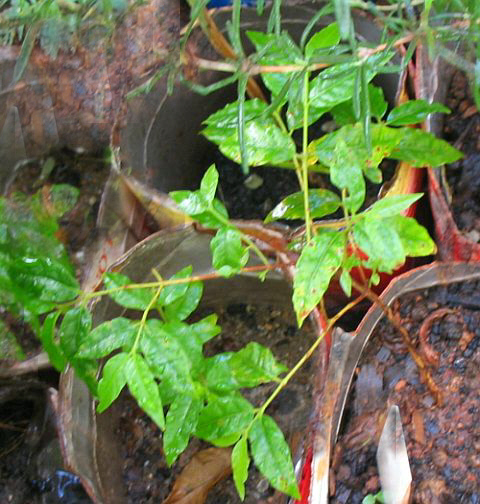
- Campomanesia phaea

Scientific classification
- Kingdom: Plantae
- Clade: Tracheophytes
- Clade: Angiosperms
- Clade: Eudicots
- Clade: Rosids
- Order: Myrtales
- Family: Myrtaceae
- Subfamily: Myrtoideae
- Tribe: Myrteae
- Genus: Campomanesia; Ruiz & Pav.

Synonyms
- Burchardia Neck.; Abbevillea O.Berg; Acrandra O.Berg; Britoa O.Berg; Lacerdaea O.Berg; Paivaea O.Berg

= Campomanesia =

Genus of flowering plants in the myrtle family

Campomanesia is a genus in the family Myrtaceae described as a genus in 1794. It is native to South America and Trinidad.

== Species ==
Species in this genus include.

1. Campomanesia adamantium – Brazil, Paraguay
2. Campomanesia anemonea – Bahia
3. Campomanesia aprica – SE Brazil
4. Campomanesia aromatica – from Trinidad to Bolivia
5. Campomanesia aurea – S Brazil, Paraguay, Uruguay, NE Argentina
6. Campomanesia blanchetiana – Bahia
7. Campomanesia cavalcantina – Goiás
8. Campomanesia cucullata – Pará
9. Campomanesia dichotoma – E Brazil
10. Campomanesia espiritosantensis – SE Brazil
11. Campomanesia eugenioides – Brazil
12. Campomanesia fruticosa – SE Brazil
13. Campomanesia grandiflora – N + NE Brazil, Fr Guiana, Suriname, Guyana, Venezuela
14. Campomanesia guaviroba – S Brazil, Paraguay, Bolivia, Misiones
15. Campomanesia guazumifolia – S + E Brazil, Paraguay, Uruguay, NE Argentina
16. Campomanesia hirsuta – Rio de Janeiro
17. Campomanesia ilhoensis – Alagoas, Bahia, Sergipe
18. Campomanesia laurifolia – SE Brazil
19. Campomanesia lineatifolia – Colombia, Peru, Ecuador, Brazil
20. Campomanesia lundiana – Rio de Janeiro
21. Campomanesia macrobracteolata – Espírito Santo
22. Campomanesia mediterranea – SE Brazil
23. Campomanesia neriiflora – São Paulo, Paraná
24. Campomanesia pabstiana – Brasília
25. Campomanesia phaea – Paraná, São Paulo, Rio de Janeiro
26. Campomanesia prosthecesepala – Minas Gerais
27. Campomanesia pubescens – Brazil, Paraguay
28. Campomanesia racemosa – SE Brazil
29. Campomanesia reitziana – São Paulo, Santa Catarina
30. Campomanesia rhombea – S + SE Brazil
31. Campomanesia rufa – C Brazil
32. Campomanesia schlechtendaliana – S + E Brazil
33. Campomanesia sessiliflora – Brazil, Paraguay, Bolivia
34. Campomanesia simulans – São Paulo, Minas Gerais
35. Campomanesia speciosa – E Peru, Acre
36. Campomanesia terminalis – Rio de Janeiro
37. Campomanesia transalpina – Rio de Janeiro
38. Campomanesia velutina – Brazil
39. Campomanesia xanthocarpa – S Brazil, Paraguay, Uruguay, NE Argentina
