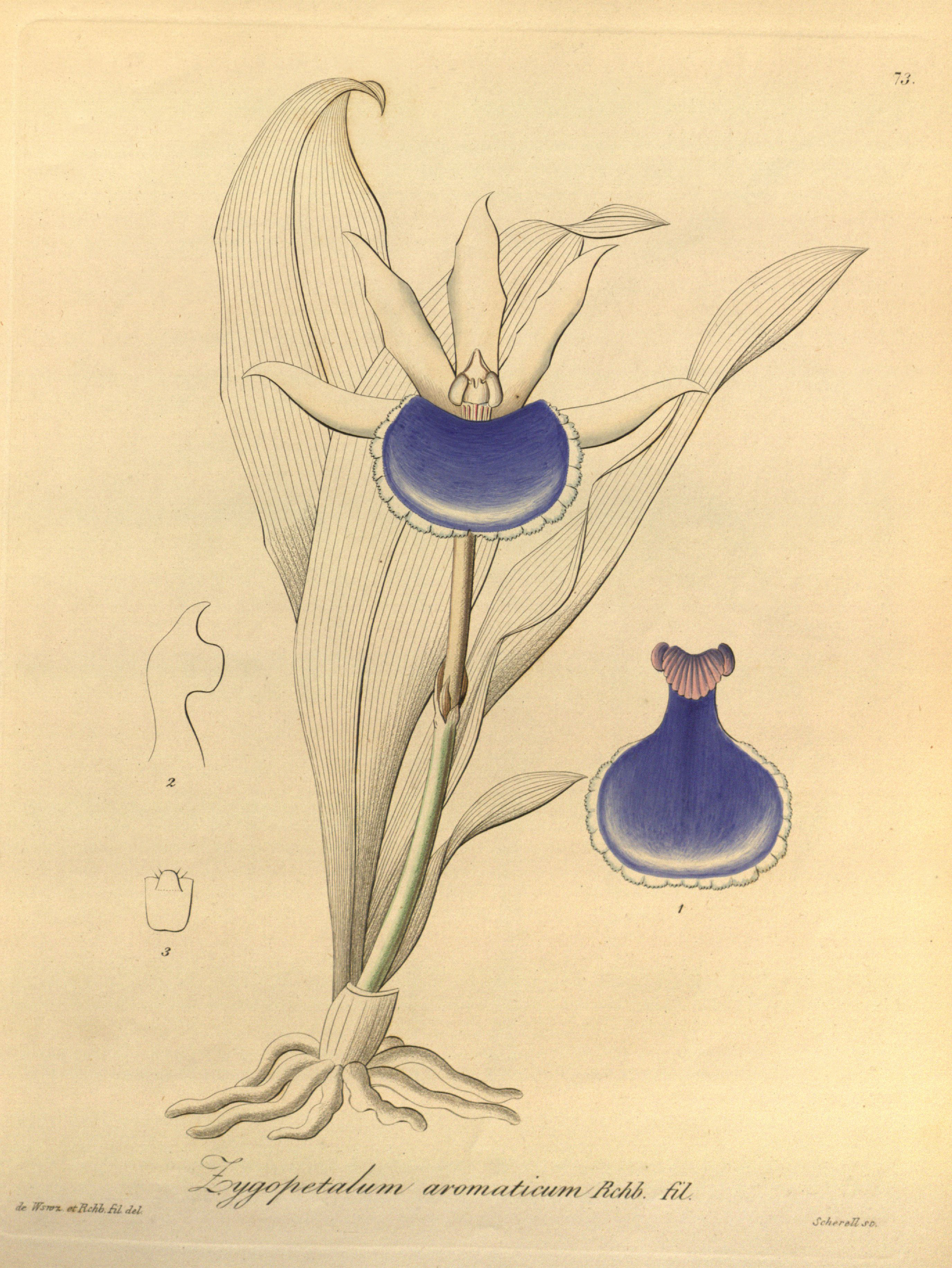

Scientific classification
- Kingdom: Plantae
- Clade: Tracheophytes
- Clade: Angiosperms
- Clade: Monocots
- Order: Asparagales
- Family: Orchidaceae
- Subfamily: Epidendroideae
- Genus: Cochleanthes
- Species: C. aromatica

Binomial name
- Cochleanthes aromatica (Rchb.f.) R.E.Schult. & Garay (1959)

Synonyms
- Zygopetalum aromaticum Rchb.f. (1852) (Basionym); Warczewiczella aromatica (Rchb.f.) Rchb.f. (1863); Zygopetalum wendlandii Rchb.f. (1866); Bollea wendlandii (Rchb.f.) auct. (1888); Warczewiczella wendlandii (Rchb.f.) Nash (1917); Chondrorhyncha aromatica (Rchb.f.) P.H.Allen (1949)

= Cochleanthes aromatica =

Species of orchid

Cochleanthes aromatica is a species of orchid.
