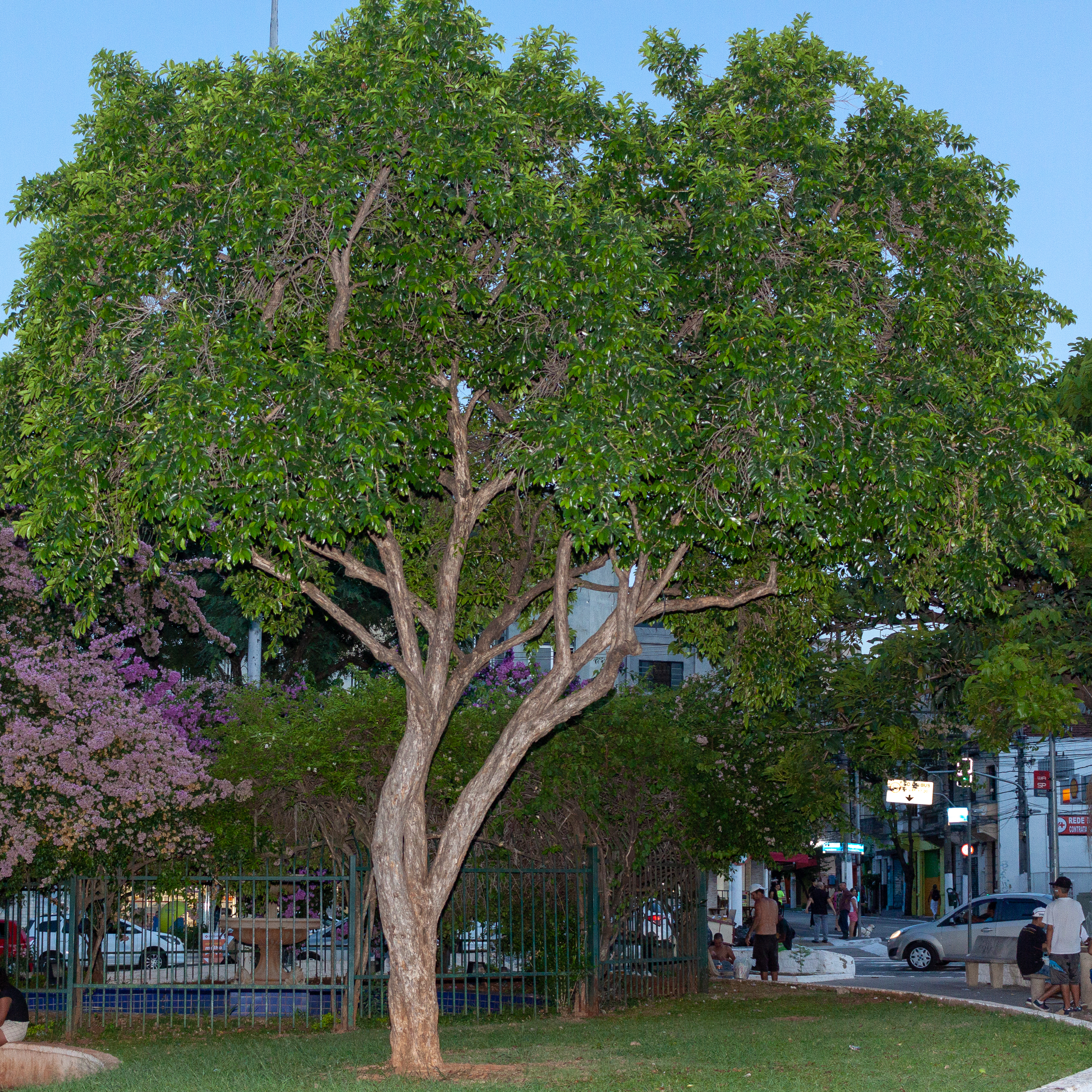
- Campomanesia phaea

Conservation status
- Least Concern (IUCN 3.1)

Scientific classification
- Kingdom: Plantae
- Clade: Tracheophytes
- Clade: Angiosperms
- Clade: Eudicots
- Clade: Rosids
- Order: Myrtales
- Family: Myrtaceae
- Genus: Campomanesia
- Species: C. phaea

Binomial name
- Campomanesia phaea (O.Berg) Landrum

Synonyms
- Abbevillea phaea O.Berg; Campomanesia phaea var. lauroana (Mattos) Mattos; Paivaea langsdorffii O.Berg; Paivaea langsdorffii var. lauroana Mattos; Paivaea phaea (O.Berg) Mattos; Paivaea phaea var. lauroana (Mattos) Mattos

= Campomanesia phaea =

Species of plant in the myrtle family

Campomanesia phaea is a species of flowering plant in the family Myrtaceae. It is a tree endemic to the Atlantic Forest ecoregion in southeastern Brazil. It is found in the states of Paraná, Rio de Janeiro, São Paulo.

In Brazil its fruit is called cambuci and the tree cambucizeiro. Not to be confused with cambucá.

== Description ==
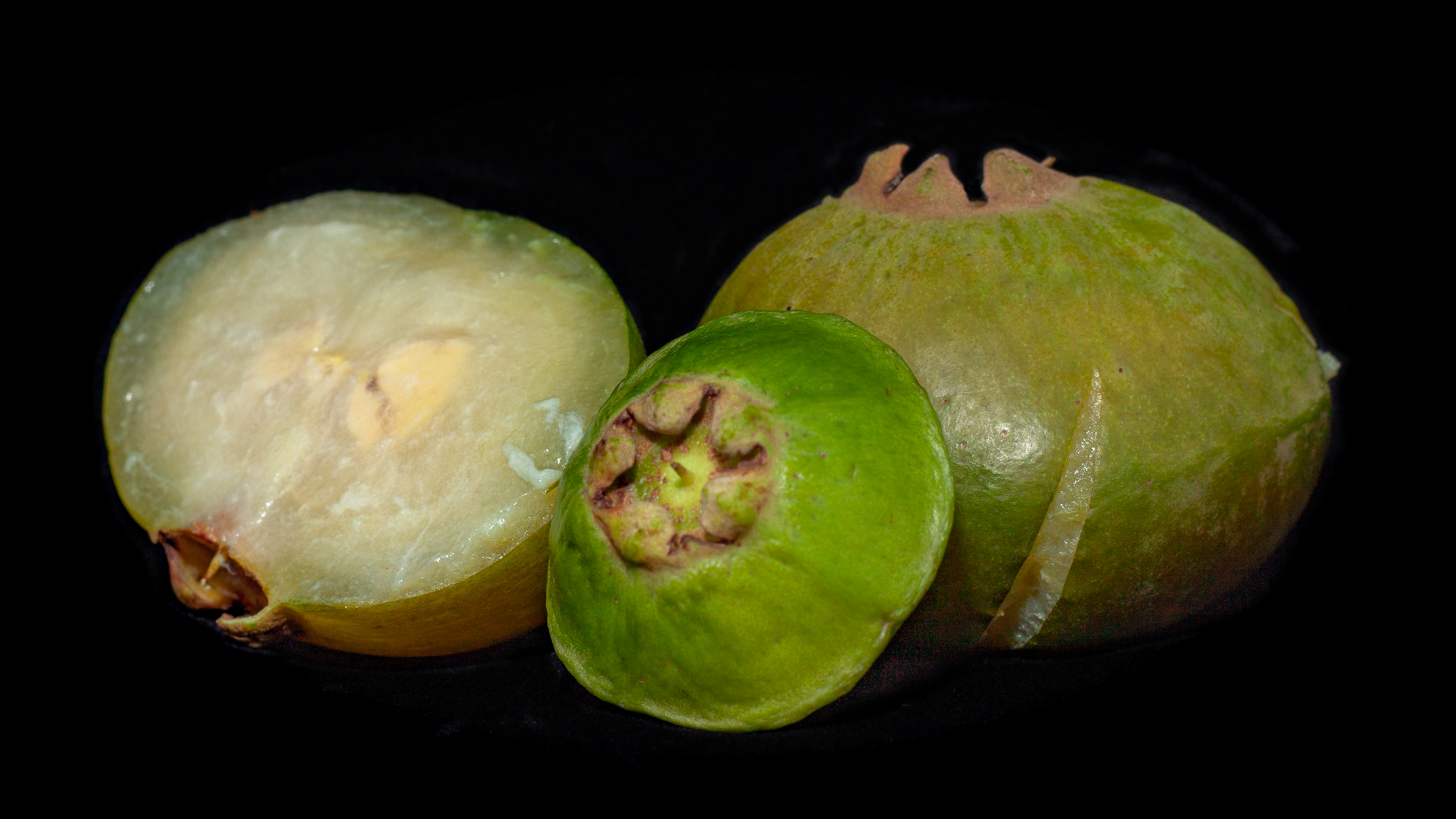
Cambuci fruit

Campomanesia phaea is a semi-deciduous tree with peeling bark, that grows to between 4 and 9 metres (13 and 30 ft) tall. It produces dark green, saucer shaped fruits around 70 mm (2.8 in) in diameter.

This species has a low propagation rate, and efforts have been made to propagate it in vitro.

== Etymology ==
The name 'cambuci' comes from the Tupi-Guarani word for clay pot, because of the resemblance between the fruit and Tupi-Guarani earthenware.

== Uses ==
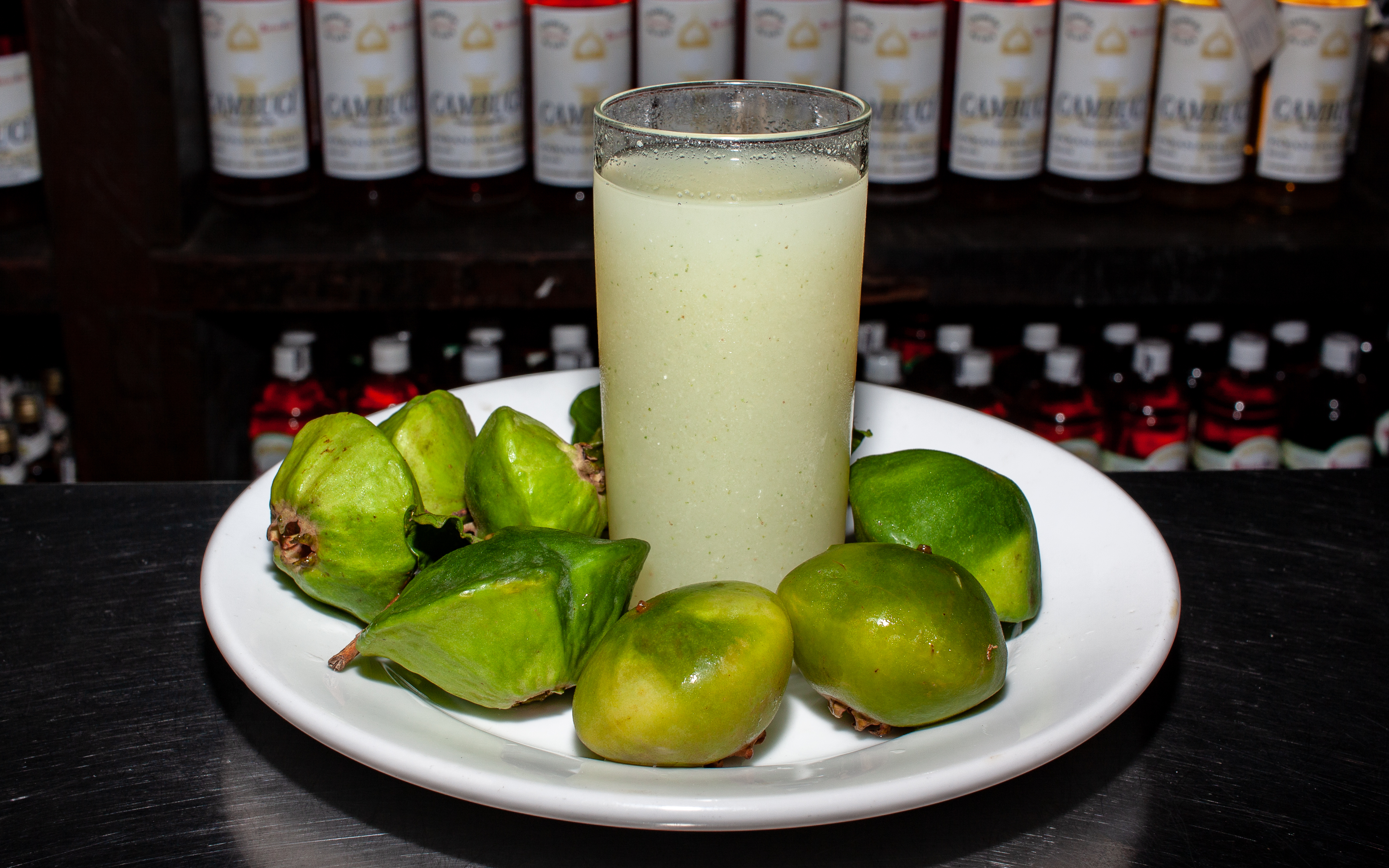
Cambuci juice

Campomanesia phaea is often cultivated in domestic gardens and orchards, for ornamental and culinary purposes. It is rare in the wild.

The cambuci fruit has an acidic, astringent flavour. It can either be eaten either raw or prepared into jellies, sherbets, or juices. The fruit is rich in vitamins and minerals and is also a source of phenolic compounds.
