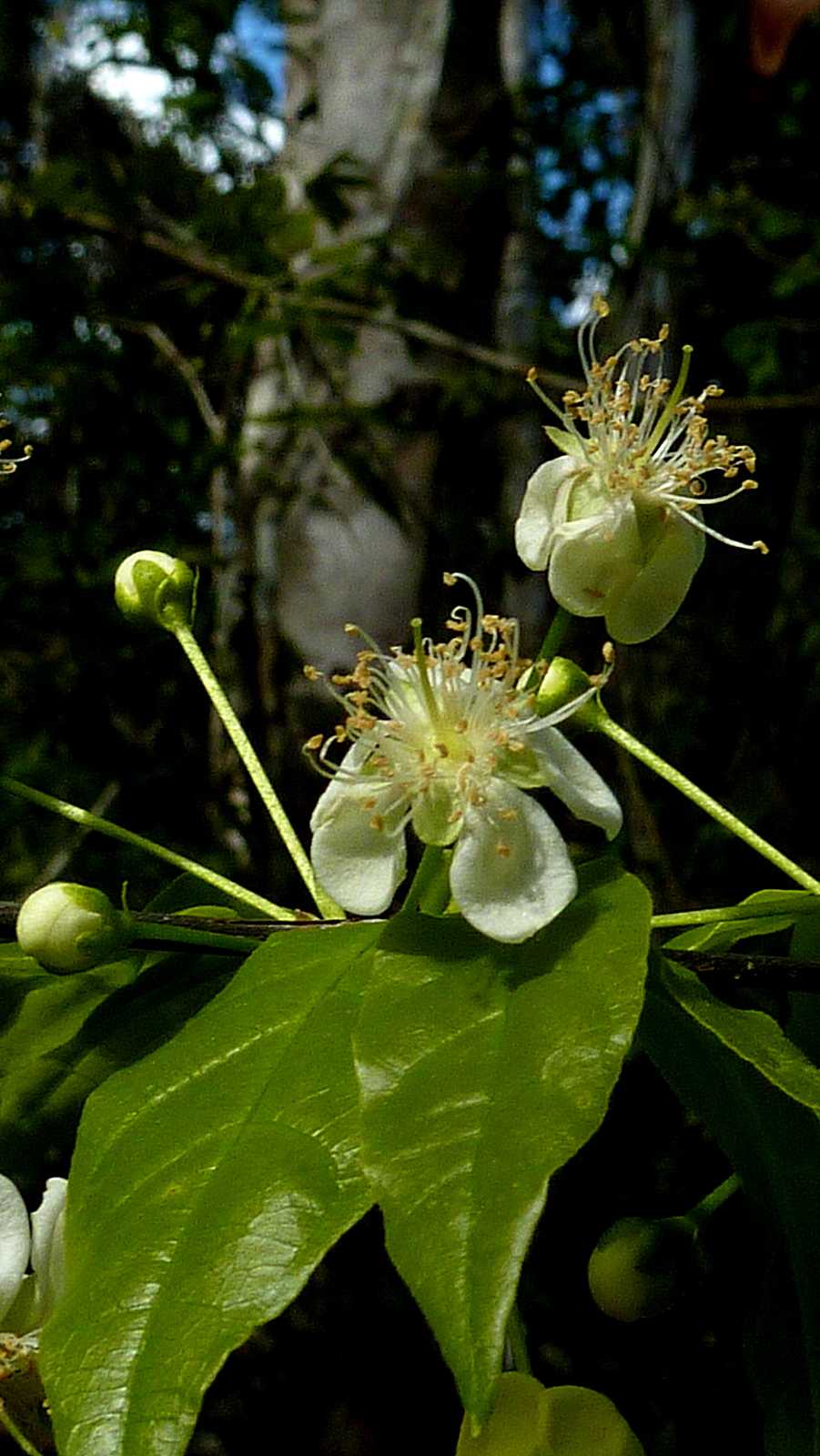

Conservation status
- Vulnerable (IUCN 2.3)

Scientific classification
- Kingdom: Plantae
- Clade: Tracheophytes
- Clade: Angiosperms
- Clade: Eudicots
- Clade: Rosids
- Order: Myrtales
- Family: Myrtaceae
- Genus: Campomanesia
- Species: C. aromatica

Binomial name
- Campomanesia aromatica (Aubl.) Griseb.

Synonyms
- Synonymy: Abbevillea martiana O.Berg, nom. illeg. superfl.; Burchardia aromatica (Aubl.) Raf.; Campomanesia beaurepairiana Kiaersk.; Campomanesia ciliata O.Berg; Campomanesia coaetanea O.Berg; Campomanesia glazioviana Kiaersk.; Campomanesia sparsiflora (DC.) J.F.Macbr.; Campomanesia synchrona O.Berg; Campomanesia tenuifolia (Mart. ex DC.) O.Berg; Eugenia desvauxiana O.Berg; Eugenia sparsiflora DC.; Myrtus fascicularis DC.; Myrtus psidioides Desv.; Psidium aromaticum Aubl.; Psidium tenuifolium Mart. ex DC.

= Campomanesia aromatica =

Species of flowering plant

Campomanesia aromatica is a species of flowering plant in the family Myrtaceae. It is a shrub or tree native to tropical South America, including Bolivia, northern Brazil, the Guianas, Venezuela, and the Atlantic Forest ecoregion of eastern and southern Brazil.
