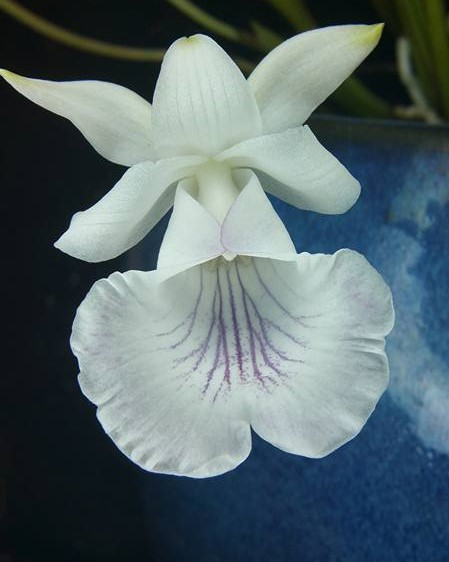

Scientific classification
- Kingdom: Plantae
- Clade: Embryophytes
- Clade: Tracheophytes
- Clade: Spermatophytes
- Clade: Angiosperms
- Clade: Monocots
- Order: Asparagales
- Family: Orchidaceae
- Subfamily: Epidendroideae
- Genus: Warczewiczella
- Species: W. amazonica

Binomial name
- Warczewiczella amazonica Rchb.f. & Warsz.

Synonyms
- Zygopetalum amazonicum (Rchb.f. & Warsz.) Rchb.f. in W.G.Walpers; Cochleanthes amazonica (Rchb.f. & Warsz.) R.E.Schult. & Garay; Chondrorhyncha amazonica (Rchb.f. & Warsz.) A.D.Hawkes; Warczewiczella lindenii (Rolfe) auct.; Zygopetalum lindenii Rolfe

= Warczewiczella amazonica =

Species of orchid

Warczewiczella amazonica is a species of orchid native to Colombia, Ecuador, Peru, and Brazil.
