= Campomanesia hirsuta =

Conservation status
- Vulnerable (IUCN 3.1)

Scientific classification
- Kingdom: Plantae
- Clade: Tracheophytes
- Clade: Angiosperms
- Clade: Eudicots
- Clade: Rosids
- Order: Myrtales
- Family: Myrtaceae
- Genus: Campomanesia
- Species: C. hirsuta

Binomial name
- Campomanesia hirsuta Gardner

Species of flowering plant

Campomanesia hirsuta is a species of flowering plant in the family Myrtaceae. It is a shrub or tree endemic to the Atlantic Forest ecoregion of southeastern Brazil, within Rio de Janeiro state. It is an IUCN Red List Vulnerable species, threatened by habitat loss.
