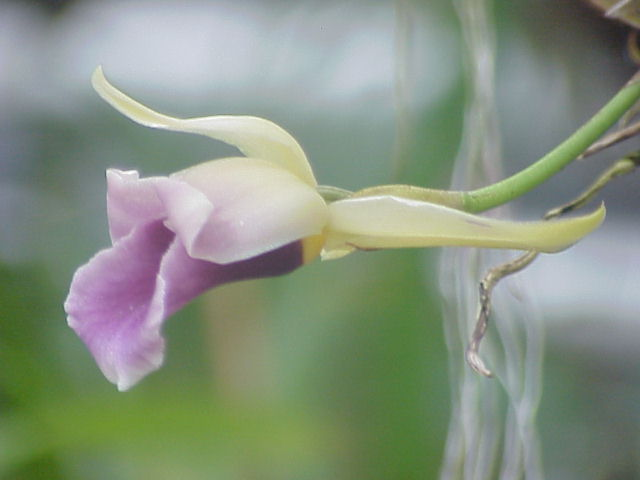

Scientific classification
- Kingdom: Plantae
- Clade: Embryophytes
- Clade: Tracheophytes
- Clade: Spermatophytes
- Clade: Angiosperms
- Clade: Monocots
- Order: Asparagales
- Family: Orchidaceae
- Subfamily: Epidendroideae
- Genus: Warczewiczella
- Species: W. discolor

Binomial name
- Warczewiczella discolor Rchb.f. & Warsz.

Synonyms
- Warrea discolor Lindl.; Zygopetalum discolor (Lindl.) Rchb.f. in W.G.Walpers; Chondrorhyncha discolor (Lindl.) P.H.Allen; Cochleanthes discolor (Lindl.) R.E.Schult. & Garay

= Warczewiczella discolor =

Species of orchid

Warczewiczella discolor is a species of orchid native to Colombia, Ecuador, Peru, Venezuela, Cuba, Costa Rica, Honduras, and Panama.
