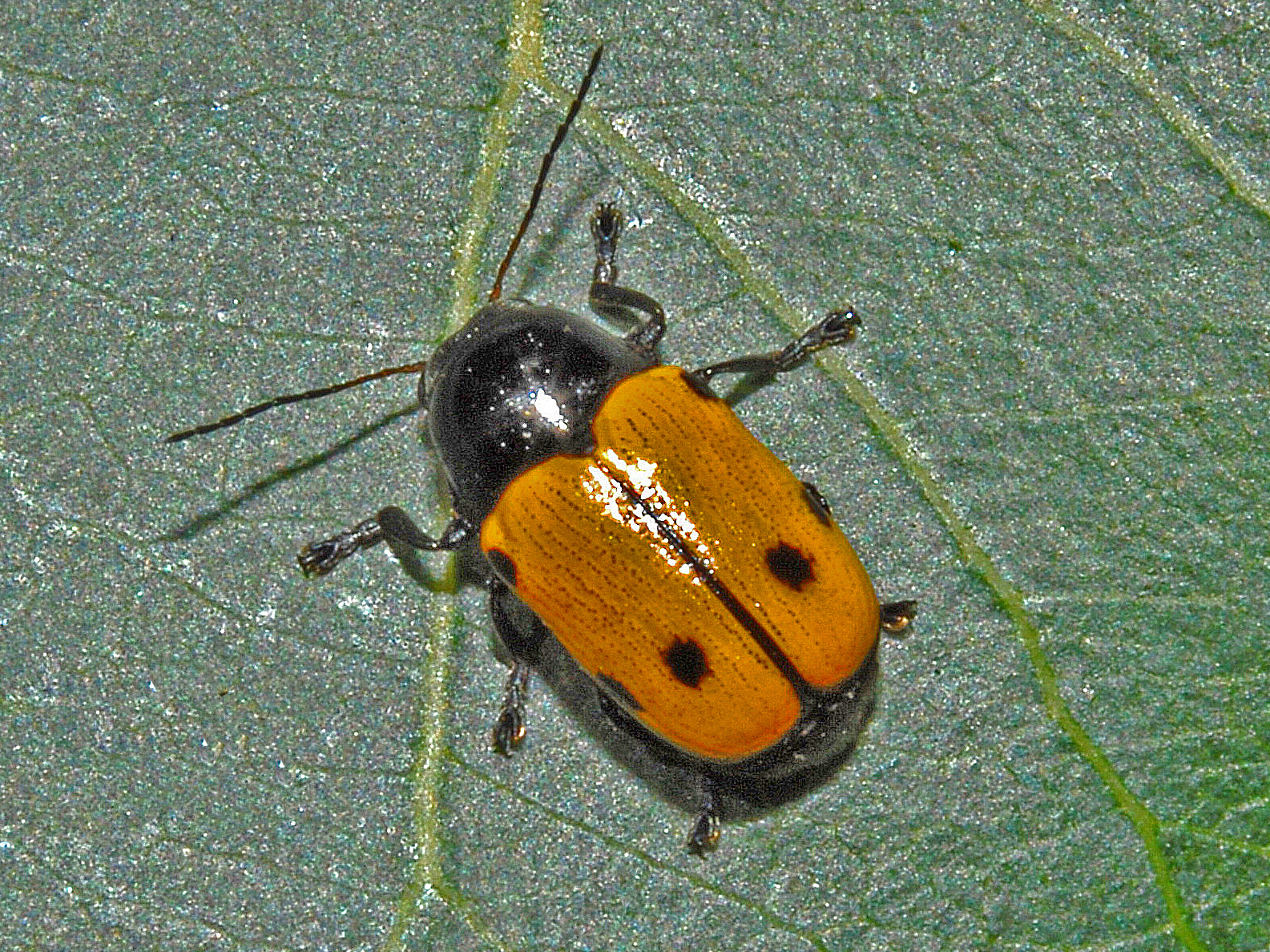
- Cryptocephalus trimaculatus. Dorsal view
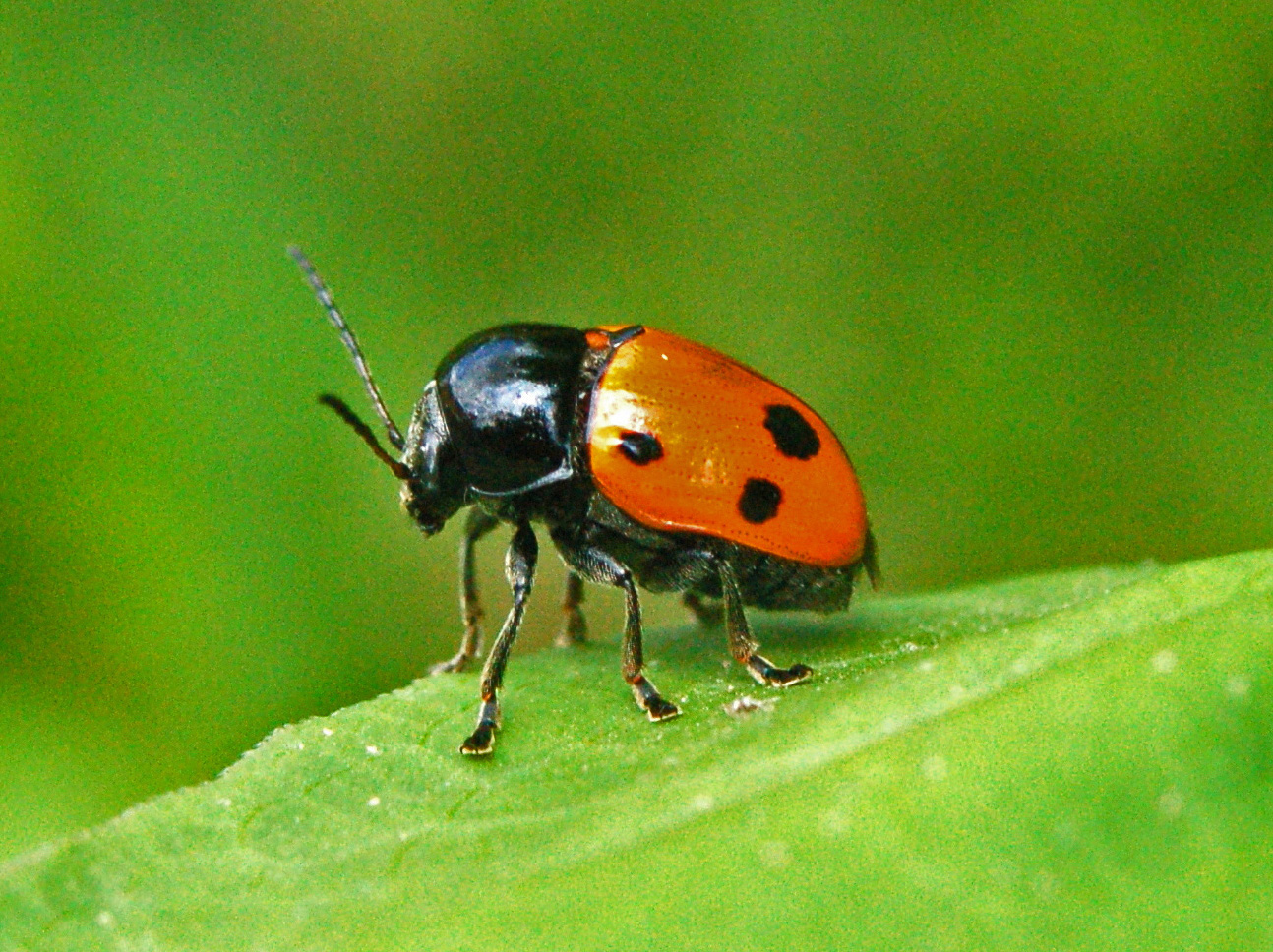
- Side view

Scientific classification
- Domain: Eukaryota
- Kingdom: Animalia
- Phylum: Arthropoda
- Class: Insecta
- Order: Coleoptera
- Suborder: Polyphaga
- Infraorder: Cucujiformia
- Family: Chrysomelidae
- Genus: Cryptocephalus
- Species: C. trimaculatus

Binomial name
- Cryptocephalus trimaculatus Rossi, 1790

Synonyms
- Cryptocephalus salicisFabricius, 1792

= Cryptocephalus trimaculatus =

Species of beetle

Cryptocephalus trimaculatus is a species of cylindrical leaf beetle belonging to the family Chrysomelidae, subfamily Cryptocephalinae.

== Etymology ==
The Latin species name trimaculatusis composed by the prefix tri meaning "three" and by the suffix maculatus meaning "spotted".

== Distribution ==
These beetles can be found in Central and Southern Europe and in the Near East.

== Habitat ==
These beetles mainly inhabit forest edges of various oaks (Quercus species) and hawthorn (Crataegus species).

== Description ==
Cryptocephalus trimaculatus can reach a body length of 5.5–8 millimetres (0.22–0.31 in). The body is oval shaped and shiny. The colour of head and pronotum is black, while elytra are orange-red, with three black spots on each elytron. There is a black spot in the front and two black spots in the back. These can be connected to each other in some subject. Abdomen and legs are black. Furthermore, the elytra are longitudinally covered of rows of small black dots. This species is rather similar to Lachnaia italica.

== Biology ==
Adults can be found from March to May and from July to September.
