= Cheilotoma beldei =

Scientific classification
- Kingdom: Animalia
- Phylum: Arthropoda
- Clade: Pancrustacea
- Class: Insecta
- Order: Coleoptera
- Suborder: Polyphaga
- Infraorder: Cucujiformia
- Family: Chrysomelidae
- Subfamily: Cryptocephalinae
- Tribe: Clytrini
- Genus: Cheilotoma
- Species: C. beldei

Binomial name
- Cheilotoma beldei Kasap, 1984

Species of beetle

Cheilotoma beldei is a species of leaf beetles from the subfamily of Cryptocephalinae that can be found in Jordan and Turkey. Cheilotoma beldei has the greatest resemblance to Cheilotoma musciformis.
