= Clytra appendicina =

Scientific classification
- Kingdom: Animalia
- Phylum: Arthropoda
- Clade: Pancrustacea
- Class: Insecta
- Order: Coleoptera
- Suborder: Polyphaga
- Infraorder: Cucujiformia
- Family: Chrysomelidae
- Subfamily: Cryptocephalinae
- Tribe: Clytrini
- Genus: Clytra
- Species: C. appendicina

Binomial name
- Clytra appendicina Lacordaire, 1848

Synonyms
- Clytra quadripunctata appendicina; Clythra appendicina Lacordaire, 1848

Species of beetle

Clytra appendicina is a species of leaf beetles from the subfamily Cryptocephalinae. Some authors consider it to be a subspecies of Clytra quadripunctata. The species is rare in its range. It is distributed in South and southern Central Europe, Asia Minor and Central Asia. It was first discovered in the northern part of Turkey.
