= Lachnaia puncticollis =

Scientific classification
- Kingdom: Animalia
- Phylum: Arthropoda
- Clade: Pancrustacea
- Class: Insecta
- Order: Coleoptera
- Suborder: Polyphaga
- Infraorder: Cucujiformia
- Family: Chrysomelidae
- Subfamily: Cryptocephalinae
- Tribe: Clytrini
- Genus: Lachnaia
- Species: L. puncticollis

Binomial name
- Lachnaia puncticollis Chevrolat, 1840

Species of beetle

Lachnaia puncticollis is a species of leaf beetles from the subfamily Cryptocephalinae that can be found in Algeria, Morocco, on the Iberian Peninsula and in southern France.
