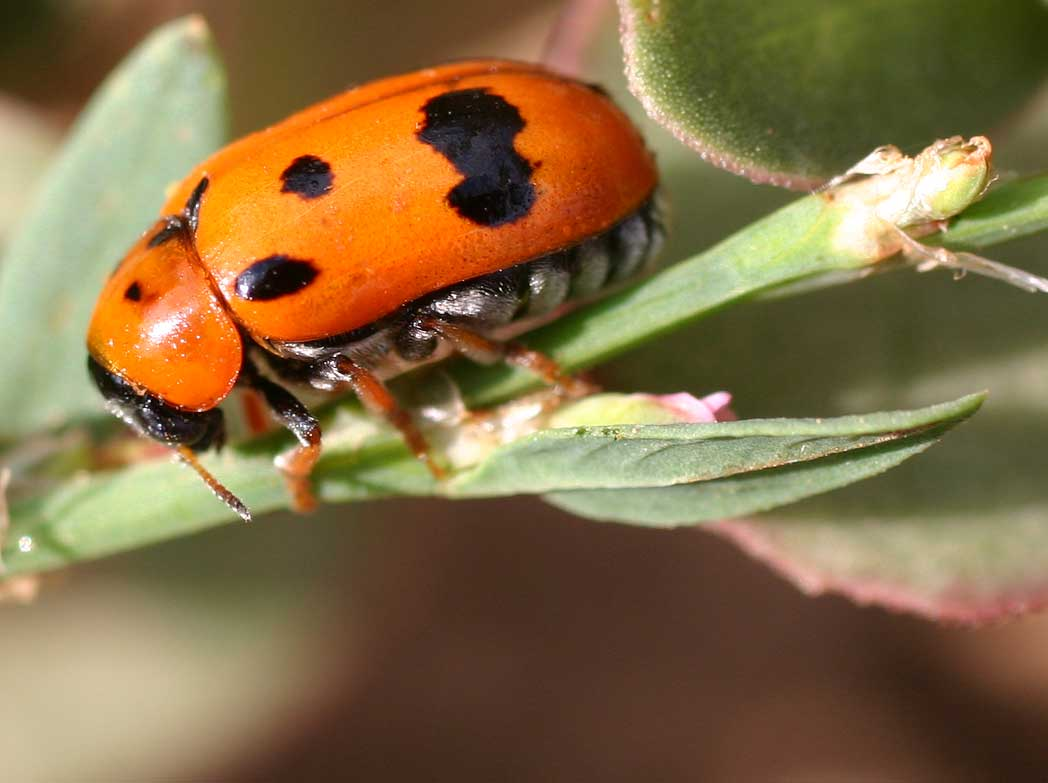
- Clytra atraphaxidis

Scientific classification
- Kingdom: Animalia
- Phylum: Arthropoda
- Clade: Pancrustacea
- Class: Insecta
- Order: Coleoptera
- Suborder: Polyphaga
- Infraorder: Cucujiformia
- Family: Chrysomelidae
- Subfamily: Cryptocephalinae
- Tribe: Clytrini
- Genus: Clytra
- Species: C. atraphaxidis

Binomial name
- Clytra atraphaxidis (Pallas, 1773)

Synonyms
- Clytra atraphaxidis atraphaxidis (Pallas, 1773); Clytra atraphaxidis maculifrons (Zoubokoff, 1833); Clytra atraphaxidis sierrana (Daniel, 1903)

= Clytra atraphaxidis =

Species of beetle

Clytra atraphaxidis is a species of leaf beetles in the subfamily Cryptocephalinae. It can be found in Southern Europe, Asia Minor, Central Asia, Mongolia and Korea.

== Subspecies ==
- Clytra atraphaxidis atraphaxidis (Pallas, 1773)
- Clytra atraphaxidis maculifrons (Zoubokoff, 1833)
- Clytra atraphaxidis sierrana (Daniel, 1903)
