= Cheilotoma erythrostoma =

Scientific classification
- Kingdom: Animalia
- Phylum: Arthropoda
- Clade: Pancrustacea
- Class: Insecta
- Order: Coleoptera
- Suborder: Polyphaga
- Infraorder: Cucujiformia
- Family: Chrysomelidae
- Subfamily: Cryptocephalinae
- Tribe: Clytrini
- Genus: Cheilotoma
- Species: C. erythrostoma

Binomial name
- Cheilotoma erythrostoma Faldermann, 1837

Species of beetle

Cheilotoma erythrostoma is a species of leaf beetles from the subfamily Cryptocephalinae. It can be found in Bulgaria, Italy, Romania, in Crimea, in the south of Russia and the Caucasus. It can also be found in Czech Republic and Slovakia.

== Subspecies ==
- Cheilotoma erythrostoma ab. italica
- Cheilotoma erythrostoma erythrostoma
