= Clytra nigrocincta =

Scientific classification
- Kingdom: Animalia
- Phylum: Arthropoda
- Clade: Pancrustacea
- Class: Insecta
- Order: Coleoptera
- Suborder: Polyphaga
- Infraorder: Cucujiformia
- Family: Chrysomelidae
- Subfamily: Cryptocephalinae
- Tribe: Clytrini
- Genus: Clytra
- Species: C. nigrocincta

Binomial name
- Clytra nigrocincta Lacordaire, 1848

Species of beetle

Clytra nigrocincta is a species of leaf beetles in the subfamily Cryptocephalinae, that can be found in eastern Turkey, Syria, Iraq, the Caucasus and in the northern part of Iran.
