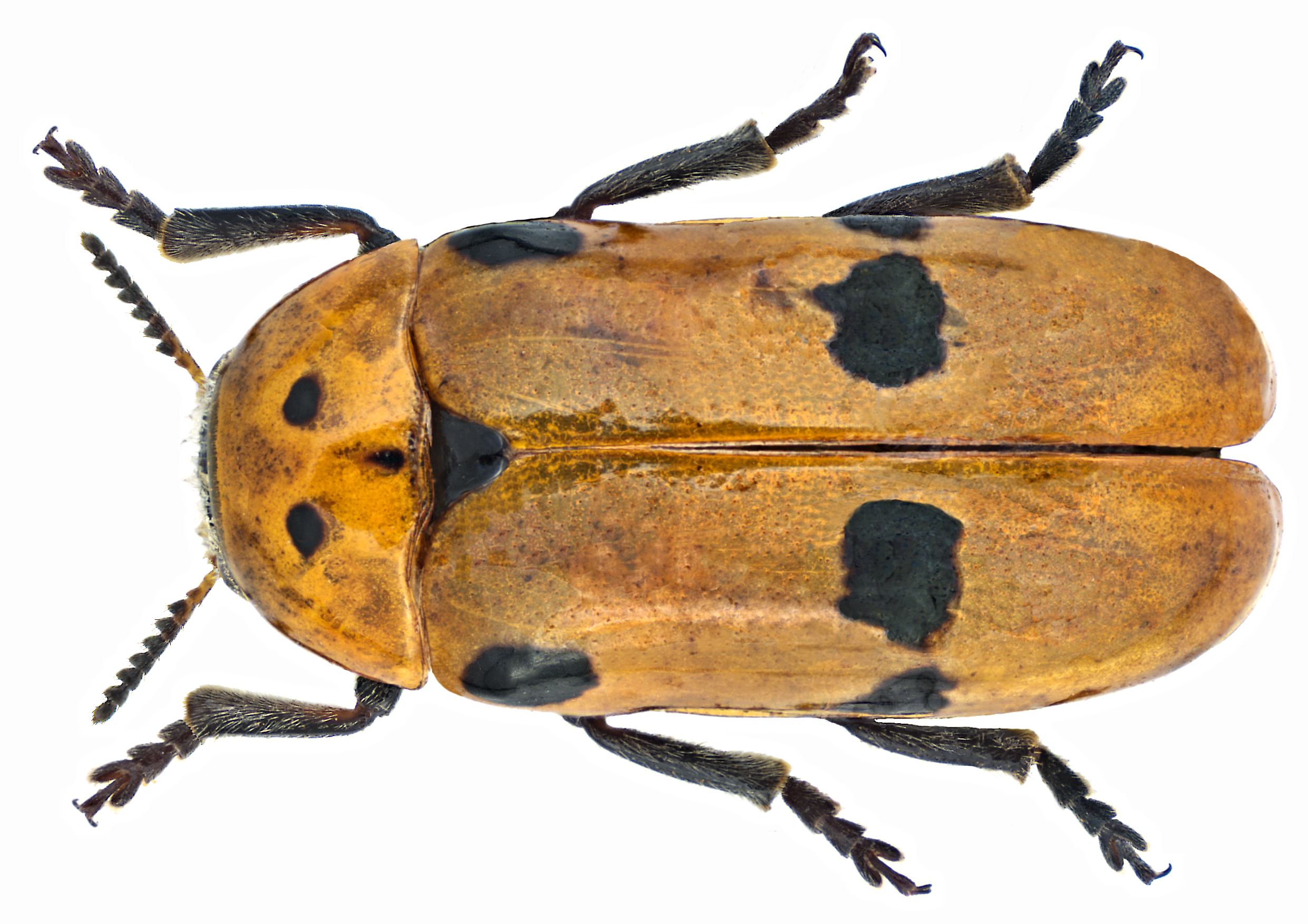

Scientific classification
- Kingdom: Animalia
- Phylum: Arthropoda
- Clade: Pancrustacea
- Class: Insecta
- Order: Coleoptera
- Suborder: Polyphaga
- Infraorder: Cucujiformia
- Family: Chrysomelidae
- Subfamily: Cryptocephalinae
- Tribe: Clytrini
- Genus: Clytra
- Species: C. novempunctata

Binomial name
- Clytra novempunctata Olivier, 1808

= Clytra novempunctata =

Species of beetle

Clytra novempunctata is a species of leaf beetles in the subfamily Cryptocephalinae. It can be found in Romania on the Balkan Peninsula, in southern Ukraine, the Russian Caucasus, Asia Minor and Central Asia. It has also been recorded in Italy, on the island of Sicily.
