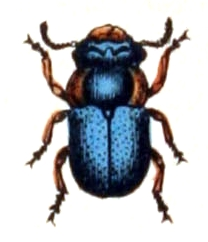
- Cheilotoma musciformis

Scientific classification
- Kingdom: Animalia
- Phylum: Arthropoda
- Clade: Pancrustacea
- Class: Insecta
- Order: Coleoptera
- Suborder: Polyphaga
- Infraorder: Cucujiformia
- Family: Chrysomelidae
- Subfamily: Cryptocephalinae
- Tribe: Clytrini
- Genus: Cheilotoma; Chevrolat in Dejean, 1836

Synonyms
- Chilotoma Agassiz, 1846

= Cheilotoma =

Genus of beetles

Cheilotoma is a genus of beetles in the subfamily Cryptocephalinae of the leaf beetles family.

== List of species ==
Eight species are included in the genus, divided into two subgenera:

- Subgenus Cheilotoma Chevrolat in Dejean, 1836
  - Cheilotoma beldei Kasap, 1984
  - Cheilotoma cankiriensis Özdikmen & Bal, 2016
  - Cheilotoma erythrostoma Faldermann, 1837
  - Cheilotoma fulvicollis Sahlberg, 1913
  - Cheilotoma musciformis (Goeze, 1777)
  - Cheilotoma rotroui Kocher, 1961
  - Cheilotoma voriseki Medvedev et Kantner, 2003
- Subgenus Exaesiognatha Jacobson, 1923
  - Cheilotoma ivanovi Jacobson, 1923
