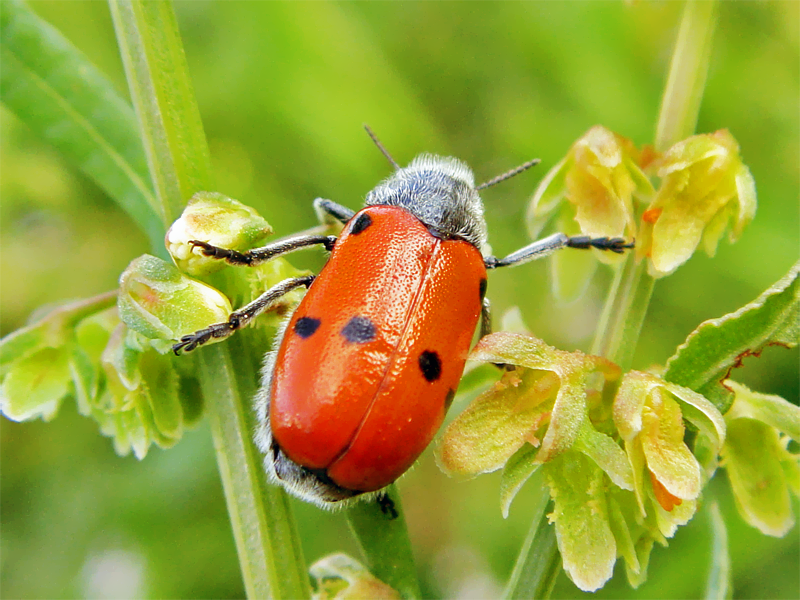

Scientific classification
- Kingdom: Animalia
- Phylum: Arthropoda
- Clade: Pancrustacea
- Class: Insecta
- Order: Coleoptera
- Suborder: Polyphaga
- Infraorder: Cucujiformia
- Family: Chrysomelidae
- Subfamily: Cryptocephalinae
- Tribe: Clytrini
- Genus: Lachnaia
- Species: L. cylindrica

Binomial name
- Lachnaia cylindrica (Lacordaire, 1848)

= Lachnaia cylindrica =

Species of beetle

Lachnaia cylindrica is a species of leaf beetles from the subfamily Cryptocephalinae. It is found on the Iberian Peninsula and in southern France, southern Italy, on Sicily and in Algeria.
