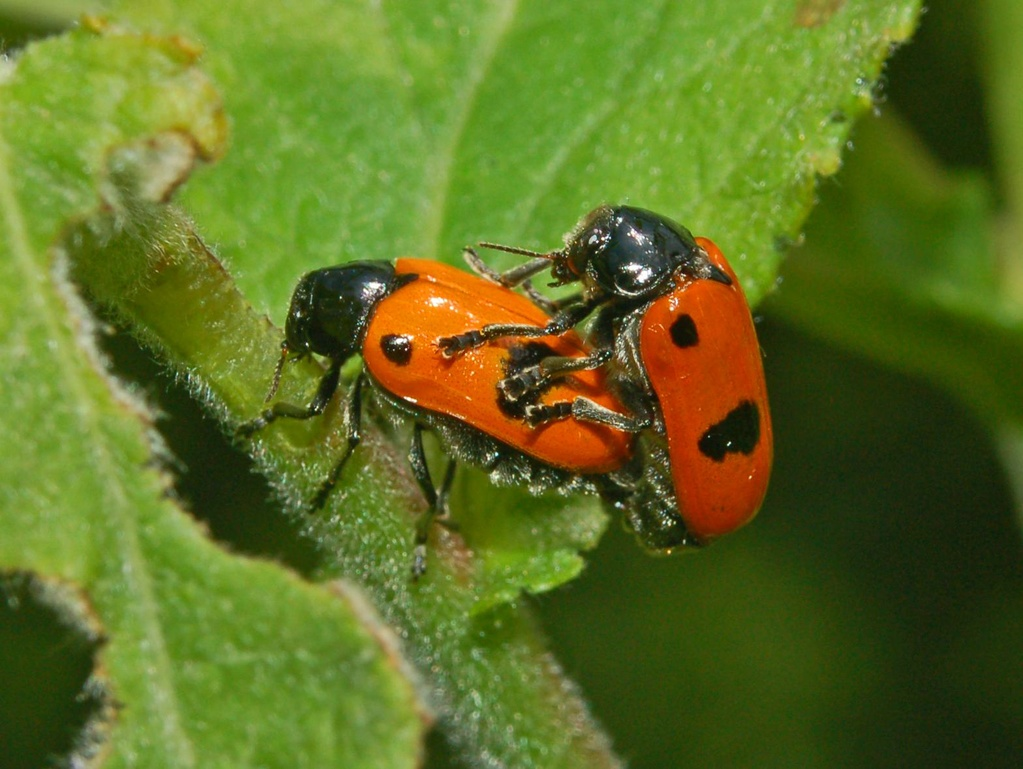
- Mating pair of Clytra laeviuscula

Scientific classification
- Kingdom: Animalia
- Phylum: Arthropoda
- Clade: Pancrustacea
- Class: Insecta
- Order: Coleoptera
- Suborder: Polyphaga
- Infraorder: Cucujiformia
- Family: Chrysomelidae
- Subfamily: Cryptocephalinae
- Tribe: Clytrini
- Genus: Clytra; Laicharting, 1781

= Clytra =

Genus of beetles

Clytra is a genus of short-horned leaf beetles belonging to the family Chrysomelidae, subfamily Cryptocephalinae.

== Species ==
- Clytra aliena Weise, 1897
- Clytra annamita Lefevre, 1889
- Clytra appendicina Lacordaire, 1848
- Clytra arida Weise, 1889
- Clytra atraphaxidis (Pallas, 1773)
- Clytra binominata Monrós, 1953
- Clytra bodemeyeri Weise, 1900
- †Clytra carbonaria von Heyden & von Heyden, 1865
- Clytra cingulata Weise, 1898
- Clytra duodecimmaculata (Fabricius, 1775)
- Clytra espanoli Daccordi & Petitpierre, 1977
- Clytra gracilis (Lacordaire, 1848)
- †Clytra greithiana Heer, 1847
- Clytra jacobsoni Semenov, 1903
- Clytra laeviuscula Ratzeburg, 1837
- Clytra nigrocincta Lacordaire, 1848
- Clytra novempunctata G.A. Olivier, 1808
- Clytra orientalis Lefevre, 1891
- Clytra ovata (Lacordaire, 1848)
- †Clytra pandorae Heer, 1847
- Clytra quadripunctata (Linnaeus, 1758)
- Clytra rotundata L. Medvedev, 1961
- Clytra rufina (Solsky, 1881)
- Clytra subfasciata Lacordaire, 1848
- Clytra subviridis Pic, 1932
- Clytra unifasciata (Pic, 1941)
- Clytra valeriana Ménétries, 1832
- Clytra variegata (Lefevre, 1890)
