= Cheilotoma voriseki =

Scientific classification
- Kingdom: Animalia
- Phylum: Arthropoda
- Clade: Pancrustacea
- Class: Insecta
- Order: Coleoptera
- Suborder: Polyphaga
- Infraorder: Cucujiformia
- Family: Chrysomelidae
- Subfamily: Cryptocephalinae
- Tribe: Clytrini
- Genus: Cheilotoma
- Species: C. voriseki

Binomial name
- Cheilotoma voriseki Medvedev & Kantner, 2003

Species of beetle

Cheilotoma voriseki is a species of leaf beetles from the subfamily Cryptocephalinae. It can be found in Turkey on Mount Nemrut in Adıyaman.
