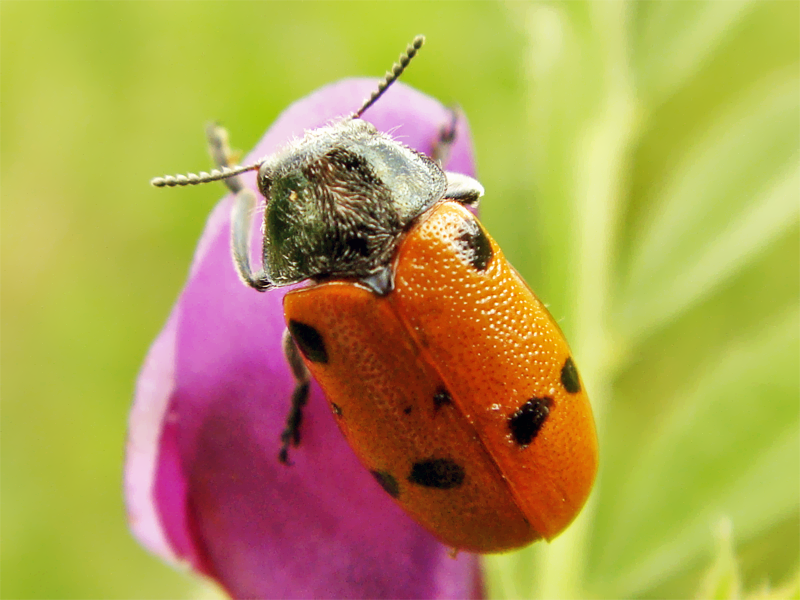
- L. tristigma

Scientific classification
- Kingdom: Animalia
- Phylum: Arthropoda
- Clade: Pancrustacea
- Class: Insecta
- Order: Coleoptera
- Suborder: Polyphaga
- Infraorder: Cucujiformia
- Family: Chrysomelidae
- Subfamily: Cryptocephalinae
- Tribe: Clytrini
- Genus: Lachnaia
- Species: L. tristigma

Binomial name
- Lachnaia tristigma (Lacordaire, 1848)

= Lachnaia tristigma =

Species of beetle

Lachnaia tristigma is a species of leaf beetles from the subfamily Cryptocephalinae that can be found from north-west Africa to the Iberian Peninsula, in southern France and in Italy.
