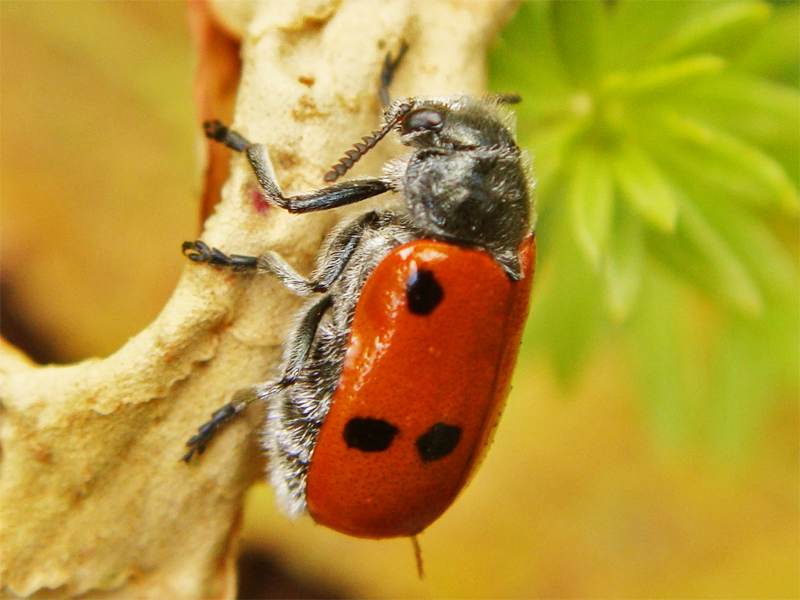

Scientific classification
- Kingdom: Animalia
- Phylum: Arthropoda
- Clade: Pancrustacea
- Class: Insecta
- Order: Coleoptera
- Suborder: Polyphaga
- Infraorder: Cucujiformia
- Family: Chrysomelidae
- Subfamily: Cryptocephalinae
- Tribe: Clytrini
- Genus: Lachnaia
- Species: L. paradoxa

Binomial name
- Lachnaia paradoxa (Olivier, 1808)

Synonyms
- Lachnaia paradoxa var. vicina (Lacordaire, 1848)

= Lachnaia paradoxa =

Species of beetle

Lachnaia paradoxa is a species of leaf beetles in the subfamily Cryptocephalinae. It can be found in Algeria, Morocco, and south Spain.

== Variety ==
- Lachnaia paradoxa var. vicina (Lacordaire, 1848)
