= Cheilotoma fulvicollis =

Scientific classification
- Kingdom: Animalia
- Phylum: Arthropoda
- Clade: Pancrustacea
- Class: Insecta
- Order: Coleoptera
- Suborder: Polyphaga
- Infraorder: Cucujiformia
- Family: Chrysomelidae
- Subfamily: Cryptocephalinae
- Tribe: Clytrini
- Genus: Cheilotoma
- Species: C. fulvicollis

Binomial name
- Cheilotoma fulvicollis Sahlberg, 1913

Species of beetle

Cheilotoma fulvicollis is a species of leaf beetles in the subfamily Cryptocephalinae that is endemic to Syria.
