= Clytra binominata =

Scientific classification
- Kingdom: Animalia
- Phylum: Arthropoda
- Clade: Pancrustacea
- Class: Insecta
- Order: Coleoptera
- Suborder: Polyphaga
- Infraorder: Cucujiformia
- Family: Chrysomelidae
- Subfamily: Cryptocephalinae
- Tribe: Clytrini
- Genus: Clytra
- Species: C. binominata

Binomial name
- Clytra binominata Monrós, 1953

Species of beetle

Clytra binominata is a species of leaf beetles in the subfamily Cryptocephalinae. It can be found in Turkey and Greece (including the island of Rhodes).
