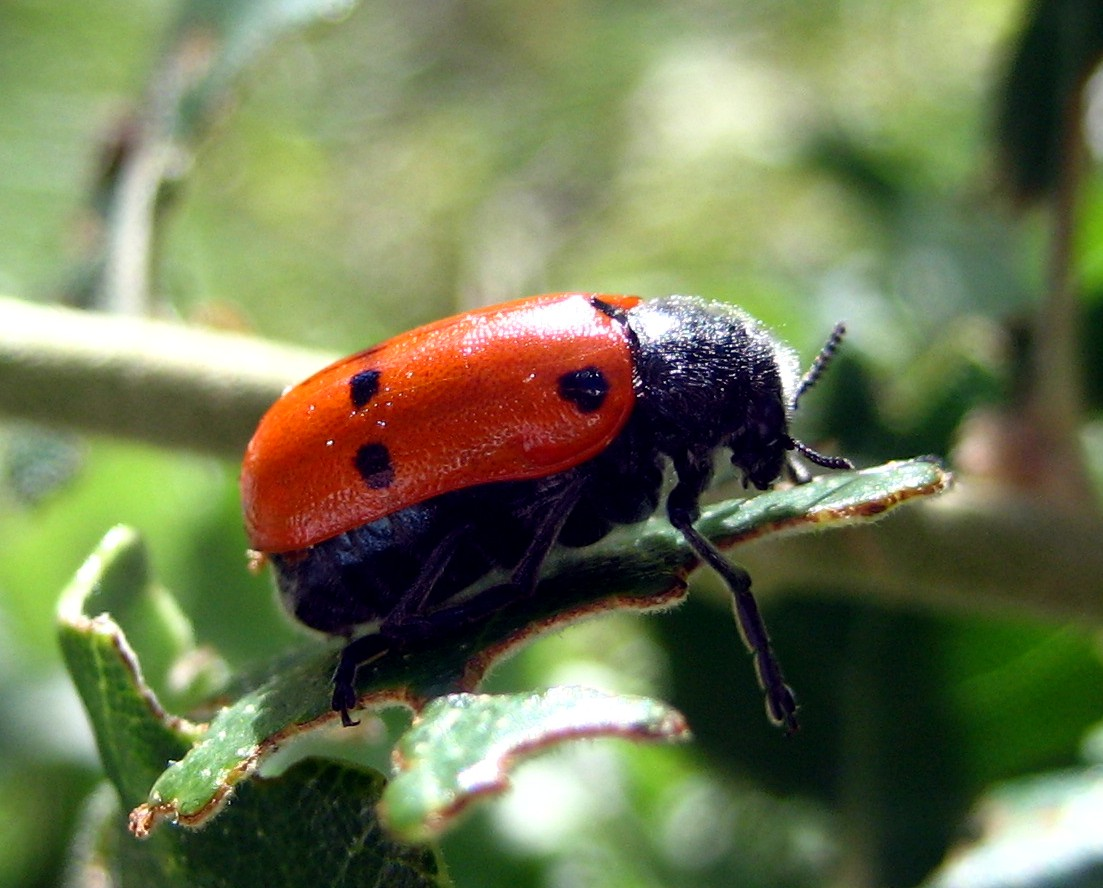
- Lachnaia trisignata

Scientific classification
- Kingdom: Animalia
- Phylum: Arthropoda
- Clade: Pancrustacea
- Class: Insecta
- Order: Coleoptera
- Suborder: Polyphaga
- Infraorder: Cucujiformia
- Family: Chrysomelidae
- Subfamily: Cryptocephalinae
- Tribe: Clytrini
- Genus: Lachnaia; Chevrolat in Dejean, 1836

= Lachnaia =

Genus of beetles

Lachnaia is a genus of leaf beetles in the subfamily Cryptocephalinae, tribe Clytrini. Multiple species in this genus are known to be myrmecophiles, such as the larvae of L. italica.

== Species ==
- Lachnaia caprai Grasso, 1958
- Lachnaia cylindrica (Lacordaire, 1848)
- Lachnaia hirta (Fabricius, 1801)
- Lachnaia italica Weise, 1881
- Lachnaia orientalis Weise, 1881
- Lachnaia paradoxa (GA Olivier, 1808)
- Lachnaia pseudobarathraea K. Daniel & J. Daniel, 1898
- Lachnaia pubescens (Dufour, 1820)
- Lachnaia puncticollis Chevrolat, 1840
- Lachnaia sexpunctata (Scopoli, 1763)
- Lachnaia tristigma (Lacordaire, 1848)
- Lachnaia variolosa (Linnaeus, 1767)
- Lachnaia zoiai Regalin, 1997
