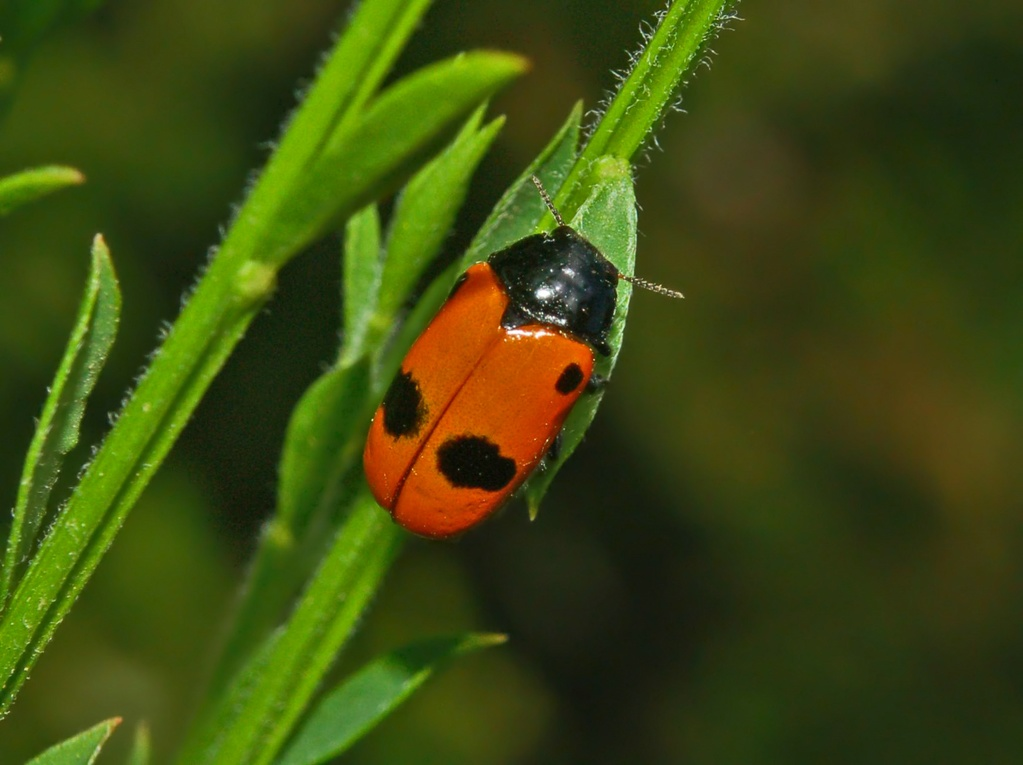
- Clytra laeviuscula

Scientific classification
- Domain: Eukaryota
- Kingdom: Animalia
- Phylum: Arthropoda
- Class: Insecta
- Order: Coleoptera
- Suborder: Polyphaga
- Infraorder: Cucujiformia
- Family: Chrysomelidae
- Subfamily: Cryptocephalinae
- Tribe: Clytrini
- Genus: Clytra
- Species: C. laeviuscula

Binomial name
- Clytra laeviuscula Ratzeburg, 1837

Synonyms
- Clythra fasciata (Fabricius 1837); Clythra laeviuscula (Ratzeburg, 1837)

= Clytra laeviuscula =

Species of beetle

Clytra laeviuscula, the ant bag beetle, is a species of short-horned leaf beetles belonging to the family Chrysomelidae, subfamily Cryptocephalinae.

== Distribution ==
They are found in most of Europe, in the eastern part of the Palearctic realm, and in the Near East.

== Habitat ==
These beetles inhabit wet forests, sunny forest edges, dry slopes and dry grasslands, but also floodplains and parks.

== Description ==
Clytra laeviuscula can reach a length of 7.5–11.5 millimetres (0.30–0.45 in) and a width of about 4 millimetres (0.16 in). These beetles have elongated bodies and shiny red-orange elytra with four black spots, two larger around the center of the elytra and two smaller on the shoulders. The prothorax is black and shiny. The head and legs are black, as well as the antennae that are quite short.

Clytra laeviuscula can be distinguished from ladybirds (family Coccinellidae) by its more elongated form and by its tarsi (ends of the legs) formed of five parts (three for ladybugs).

This species is rather similar to Clytra quadripunctata.

== Biology ==
Adults occurs frequently from May to August. They are phytophagous. They feed on leaves, flowers and pollen of deciduous trees, mainly of Quercus robur, Salix, Populus, Betula, Fraxinus excelsior, Fagus sylvatica, Dorycnium, Prunus, Ulmus and Corylus avellana. They feed also on pollen of Rosa canina, Polygonum bistorta and Leucanthemum vulgare.

Clytra laeviuscula has a special relationship with ants. The females wrap each egg with their hind legs in a ball of about 2 mm of excrements/feces and leaves it in the vicinity of an anthill. The eggs are taken to the nest by ants, where the larvae made a kind of tube that serves to protect them from ants. They feed on the waste and other detritus left by the ants, on their eggs and on their larvae. The adults usually emerge after about two weeks. The larval cycle lasts about two years.

== Gallery ==
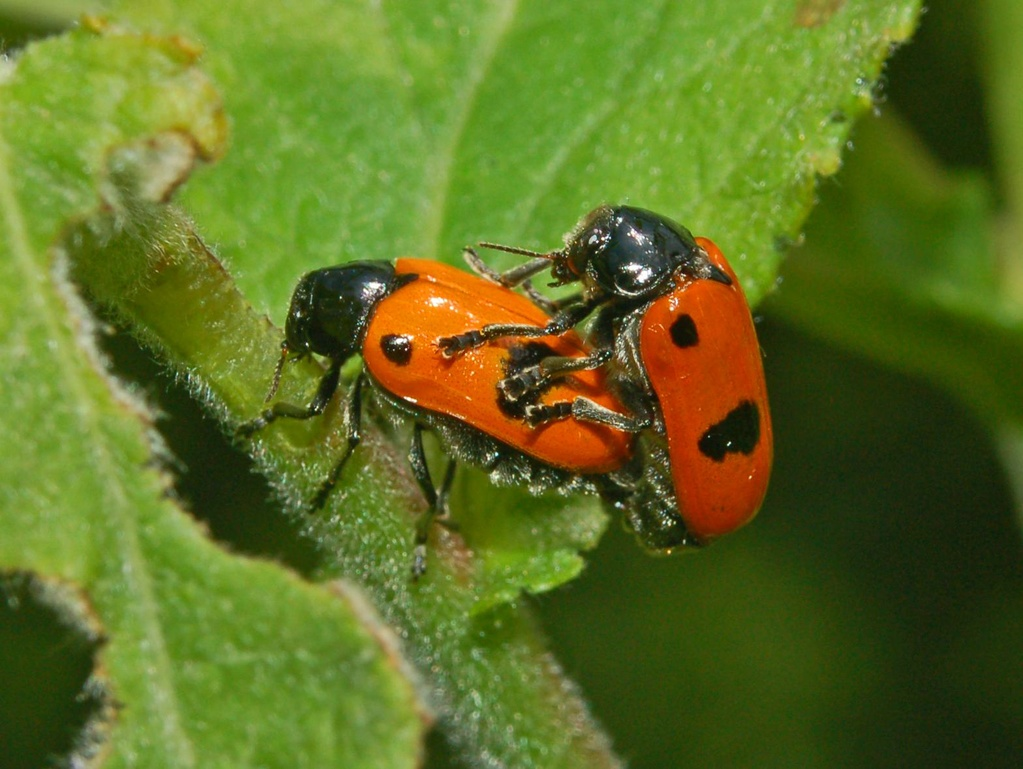
Mating pair

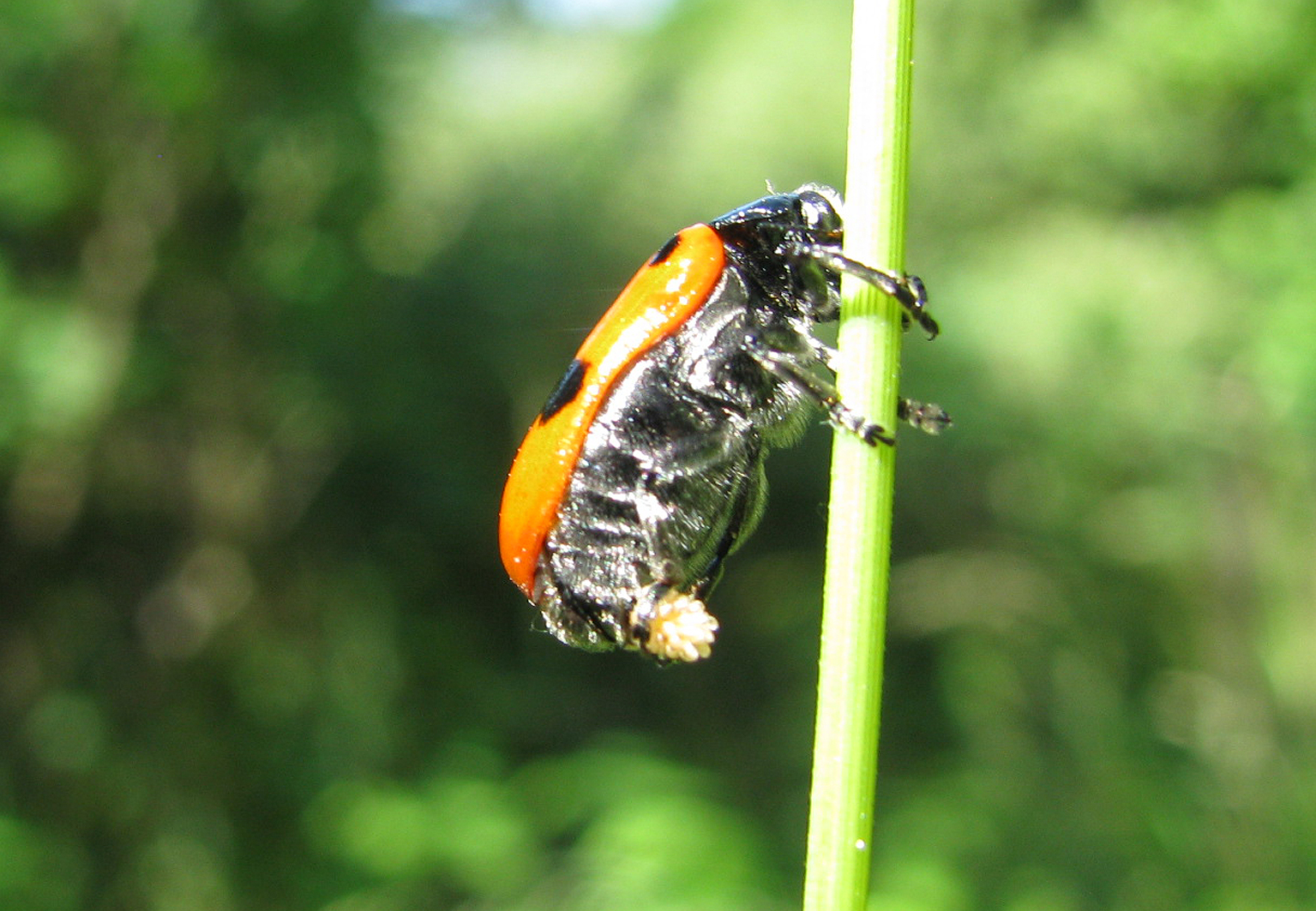
Oviposition

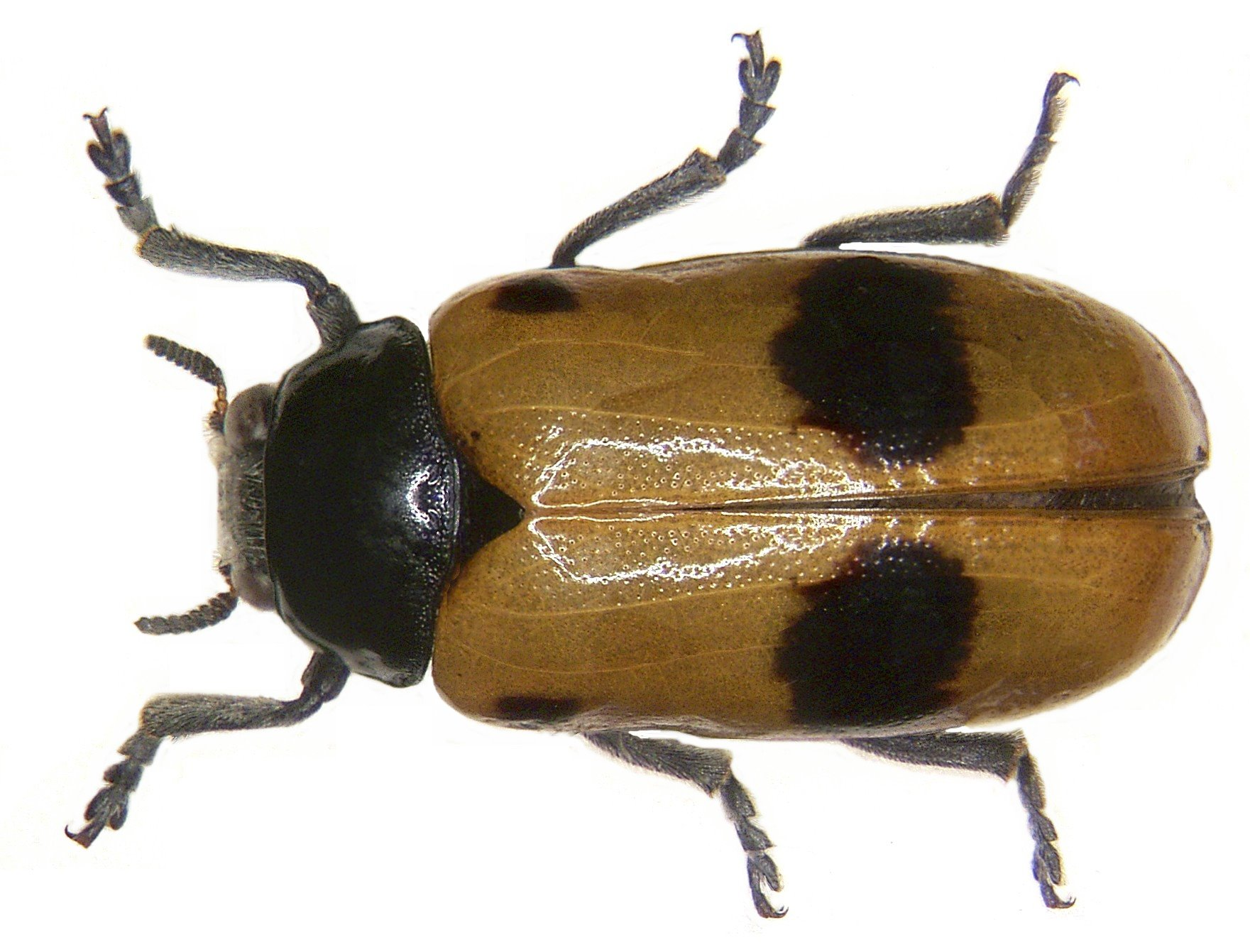
Mounted specimen
