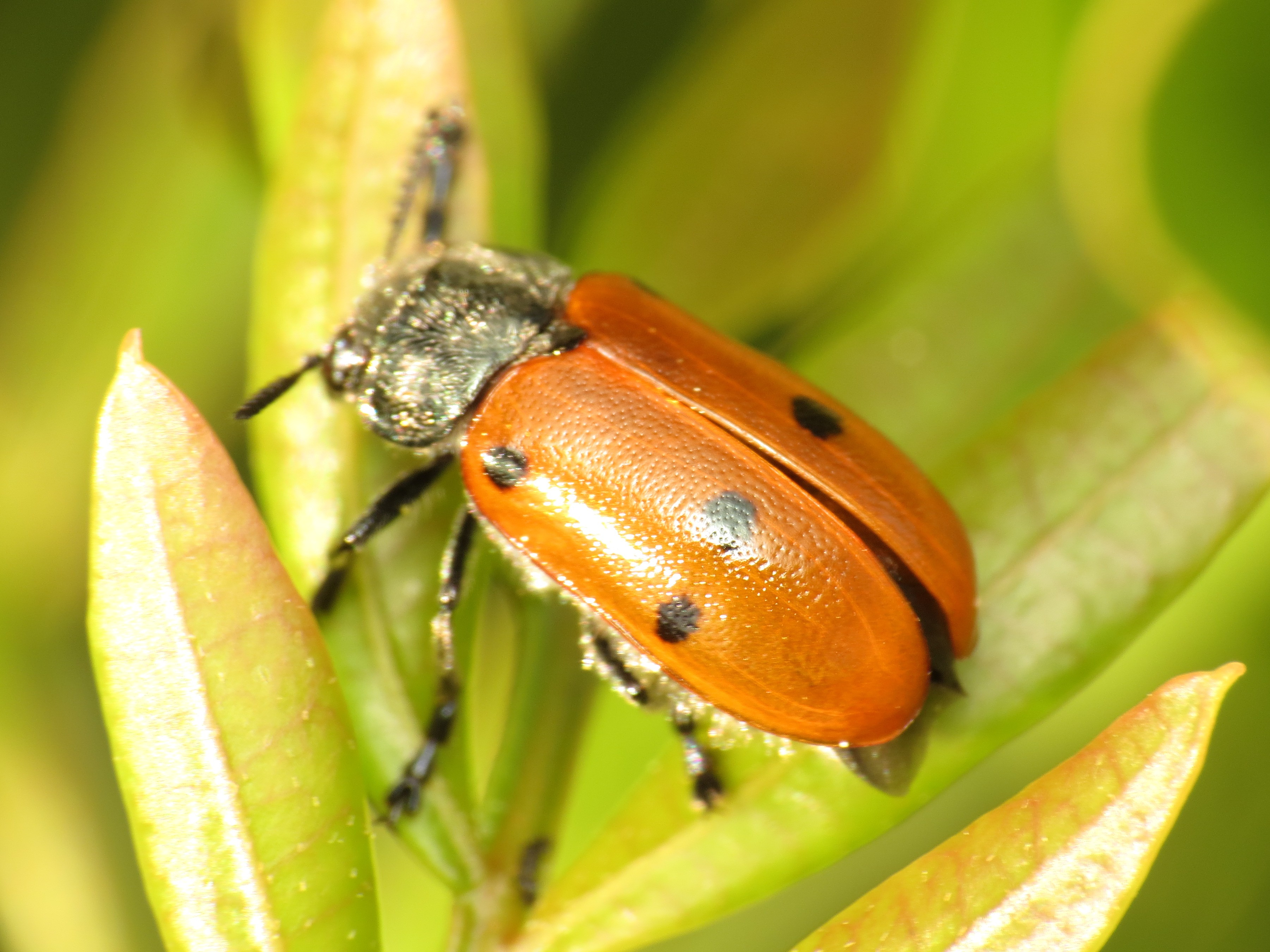

Scientific classification
- Kingdom: Animalia
- Phylum: Arthropoda
- Clade: Pancrustacea
- Class: Insecta
- Order: Coleoptera
- Suborder: Polyphaga
- Infraorder: Cucujiformia
- Family: Chrysomelidae
- Subfamily: Cryptocephalinae
- Tribe: Clytrini
- Genus: Lachnaia
- Species: L. hirta

Binomial name
- Lachnaia hirta (Fabricius, 1801)

= Lachnaia hirta =

Species of beetle

Lachnaia hirta is a species of leaf beetles from the subfamily Cryptocephalinae. It is found in northwest Africa, on the Iberian Peninsula and in southern France, southern Italy and on Sicily.
