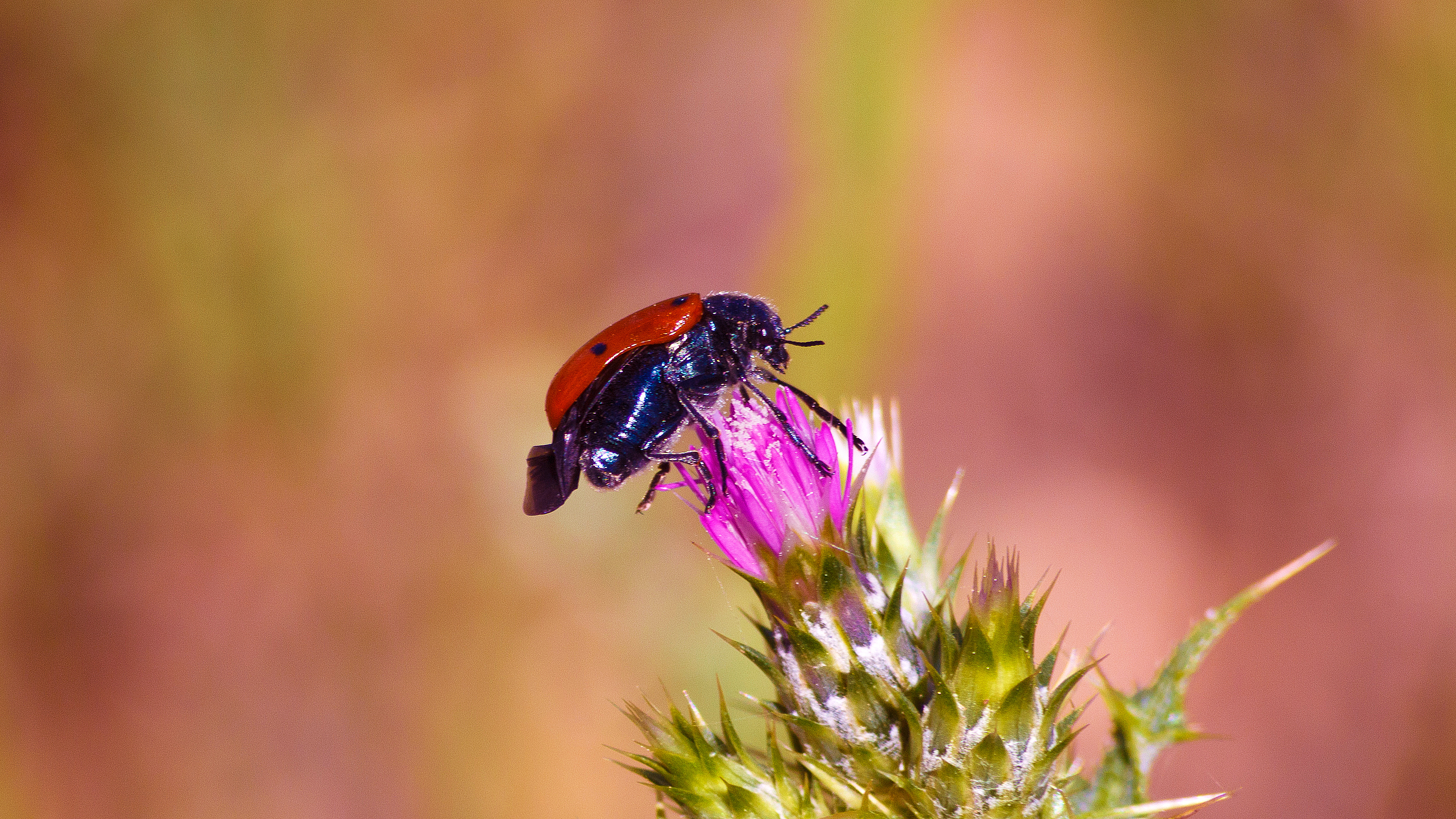

Scientific classification
- Kingdom: Animalia
- Phylum: Arthropoda
- Clade: Pancrustacea
- Class: Insecta
- Order: Coleoptera
- Suborder: Polyphaga
- Infraorder: Cucujiformia
- Family: Chrysomelidae
- Subfamily: Cryptocephalinae
- Tribe: Clytrini
- Genus: Lachnaia
- Species: L. pubescens

Binomial name
- Lachnaia pubescens (Dufour, 1820)

= Lachnaia pubescens =

Species of beetle

Lachnaia pubescens is a species of leaf beetles from the subfamily Cryptocephalinae. It is found from North West Africa to the Iberian Peninsula, South France, Corsica and Sardinia.
