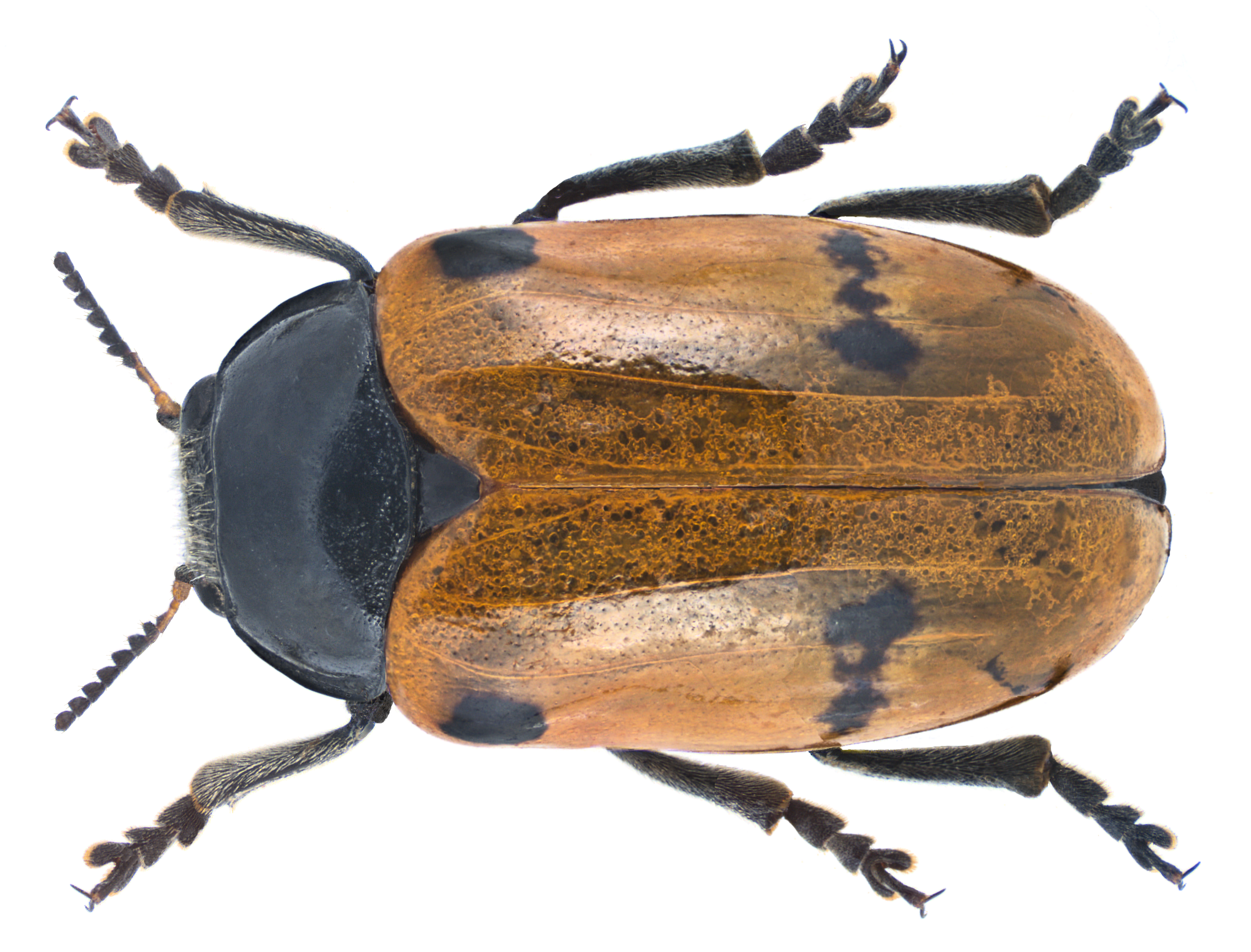

Scientific classification
- Kingdom: Animalia
- Phylum: Arthropoda
- Clade: Pancrustacea
- Class: Insecta
- Order: Coleoptera
- Suborder: Polyphaga
- Infraorder: Cucujiformia
- Family: Chrysomelidae
- Subfamily: Cryptocephalinae
- Tribe: Clytrini
- Genus: Clytra
- Species: C. rotundata

Binomial name
- Clytra rotundata Medvedev, 1961

= Clytra rotundata =

Species of beetle

Clytra rotundata is a species of leaf beetle in the subfamily Cryptocephalinae, that is native to Cyprus.
