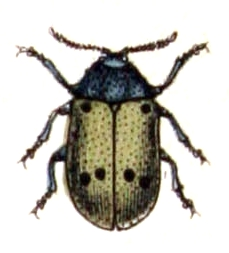

Scientific classification
- Kingdom: Animalia
- Phylum: Arthropoda
- Clade: Pancrustacea
- Class: Insecta
- Order: Coleoptera
- Suborder: Polyphaga
- Infraorder: Cucujiformia
- Family: Chrysomelidae
- Subfamily: Cryptocephalinae
- Tribe: Clytrini
- Genus: Lachnaia
- Species: L. sexpunctata

Binomial name
- Lachnaia sexpunctata (Scopoli, 1763)

= Lachnaia sexpunctata =

Species of beetle

Lachnaia sexpunctata is a species of leaf beetles from the subfamily Cryptocephalinae. It is found from north-eastern France to Turkey and from north to southern Germany and Slovakia.
