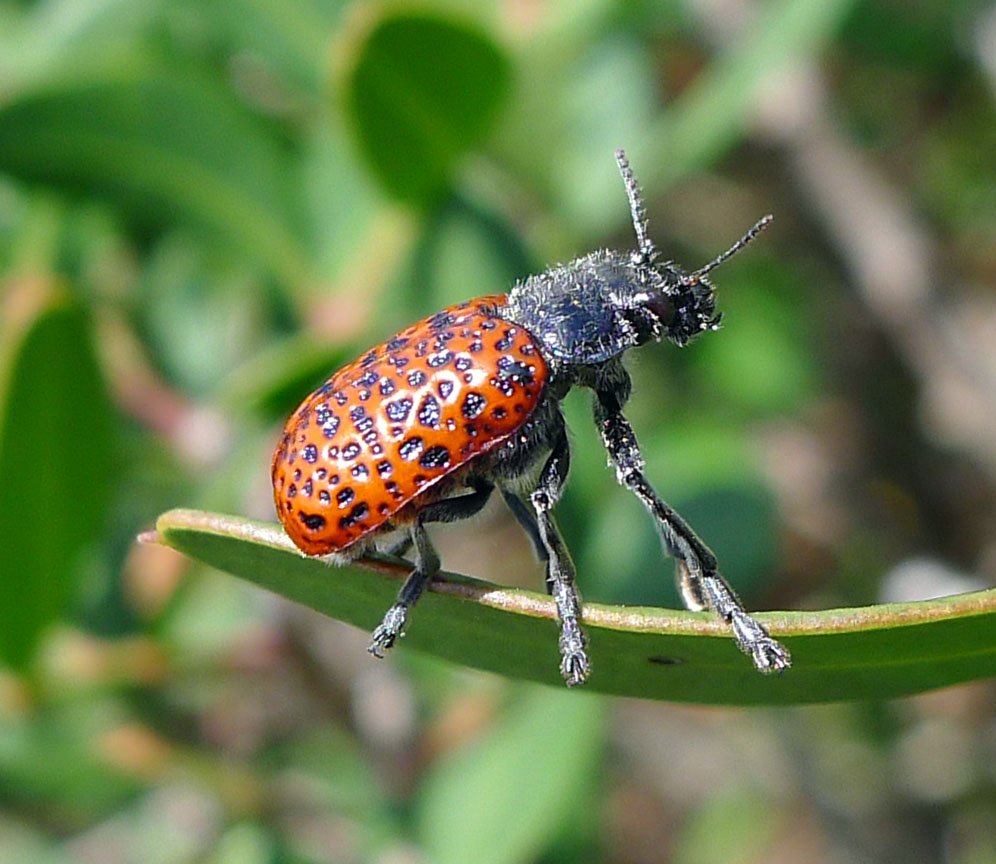

Scientific classification
- Kingdom: Animalia
- Phylum: Arthropoda
- Clade: Pancrustacea
- Class: Insecta
- Order: Coleoptera
- Suborder: Polyphaga
- Infraorder: Cucujiformia
- Family: Chrysomelidae
- Subfamily: Cryptocephalinae
- Tribe: Clytrini
- Genus: Lachnaia
- Species: L. variolosa

Binomial name
- Lachnaia variolosa (Linnaeus, 1767)

= Lachnaia variolosa =

Species of beetle

Lachnaia variolosa is a species of leaf beetles from the subfamily Cryptocephalinae that can be found in Algeria, Morocco and southern Spain.
