= Lachnaia zoiai =

Scientific classification
- Kingdom: Animalia
- Phylum: Arthropoda
- Clade: Pancrustacea
- Class: Insecta
- Order: Coleoptera
- Suborder: Polyphaga
- Infraorder: Cucujiformia
- Family: Chrysomelidae
- Subfamily: Cryptocephalinae
- Tribe: Clytrini
- Genus: Lachnaia
- Species: L. zoiai

Binomial name
- Lachnaia zoiai Regalin, 1997

Species of beetle

Lachnaia zoiai is a species of leaf beetles from the subfamily of Cryptocephalinae that inhabits in the southern part of Greece and Crete.
