= Clytra ovata =

Scientific classification
- Kingdom: Animalia
- Phylum: Arthropoda
- Clade: Pancrustacea
- Class: Insecta
- Order: Coleoptera
- Suborder: Polyphaga
- Infraorder: Cucujiformia
- Family: Chrysomelidae
- Subfamily: Cryptocephalinae
- Tribe: Clytrini
- Genus: Clytra
- Species: C. ovata

Binomial name
- Clytra ovata Lacordaire, 1848

Species of beetle

Clytra ovata is a species of leaf beetle from the subfamily of Cryptocephalinae. It can be found on Cyprus and in southern Turkey and the Middle East.
