= Clytra cingulata =

Scientific classification
- Kingdom: Animalia
- Phylum: Arthropoda
- Clade: Pancrustacea
- Class: Insecta
- Order: Coleoptera
- Suborder: Polyphaga
- Infraorder: Cucujiformia
- Family: Chrysomelidae
- Subfamily: Cryptocephalinae
- Tribe: Clytrini
- Genus: Clytra
- Species: C. cingulata

Binomial name
- Clytra cingulata Weise, 1898

Species of beetle

Clytra cingulata is a species of leaf beetle from the tribe Clytrini that can be found in Asia Minor and the Middle East.
