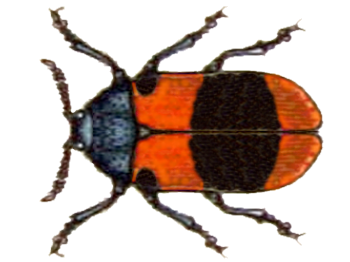

Scientific classification
- Kingdom: Animalia
- Phylum: Arthropoda
- Clade: Pancrustacea
- Class: Insecta
- Order: Coleoptera
- Suborder: Polyphaga
- Infraorder: Cucujiformia
- Family: Chrysomelidae
- Subfamily: Cryptocephalinae
- Tribe: Clytrini
- Genus: Lachnaia
- Species: L. pseudobarathraea

Binomial name
- Lachnaia pseudobarathraea Weise, 1881

= Lachnaia pseudobarathraea =

Species of beetle

Lachnaia pseudobarathraea is a species of leaf beetles from the subfamily Cryptocephalinae. It can be found in Sierra Nevada in Spain.
