= Clytra bodemeyeri =

Scientific classification
- Kingdom: Animalia
- Phylum: Arthropoda
- Clade: Pancrustacea
- Class: Insecta
- Order: Coleoptera
- Suborder: Polyphaga
- Infraorder: Cucujiformia
- Family: Chrysomelidae
- Subfamily: Cryptocephalinae
- Tribe: Clytrini
- Genus: Clytra
- Species: C. bodemeyeri

Binomial name
- Clytra bodemeyeri Weise, 1900

Species of beetle

Clytra bodemeyeri is a species of leaf beetles in the subfamily Cryptocephalinae that can be found in Asia Minor and Iraq.
