= Clytra aliena =

Scientific classification
- Kingdom: Animalia
- Phylum: Arthropoda
- Clade: Pancrustacea
- Class: Insecta
- Order: Coleoptera
- Suborder: Polyphaga
- Infraorder: Cucujiformia
- Family: Chrysomelidae
- Subfamily: Cryptocephalinae
- Tribe: Clytrini
- Genus: Clytra
- Species: C. aliena

Binomial name
- Clytra aliena Weise, 1897

Species of beetle

Clytra aliena is a species of leaf beetles from the subfamily Cryptocephalinae, that is native to Turkey.
