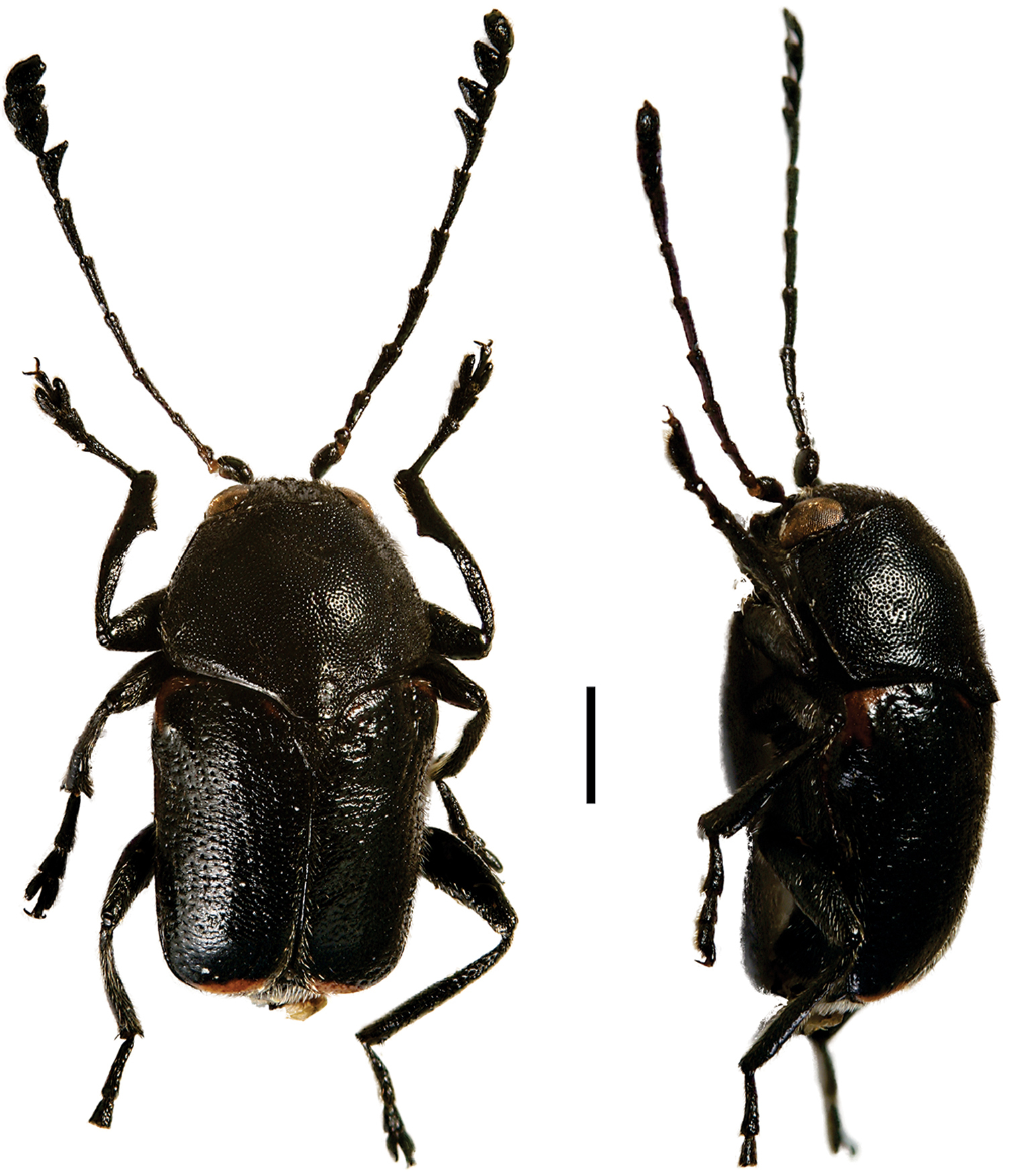
- Mylassa pectinicornis

Scientific classification
- Kingdom: Animalia
- Phylum: Arthropoda
- Clade: Pancrustacea
- Class: Insecta
- Order: Coleoptera
- Suborder: Polyphaga
- Infraorder: Cucujiformia
- Family: Chrysomelidae
- (unranked): Camptosomata
- Subfamily: Cryptocephalinae
- Tribe: Mylassini; Gómez-Zurita & Cardoso, 2021
- Genus: Mylassa; Stål, 1857

= Mylassa (beetle) =

Genus of beetles

Mylassa is a genus of case-bearing leaf beetles in the family Chrysomelidae. It is the only member of the tribe Mylassini within the subfamily Cryptocephalinae. There are thirteen described species distributed in the southern part of South America.

== Species ==
- Mylassa crassicollis (Blanchard, 1851)
- Mylassa daccordii Sassi, 2025
- Mylassa ferruginea Sassi, 2025
- Mylassa flavolimbata Sassi, 2025
- Mylassa frigens Monrós, 1949
- Mylassa fuliginosa Sassi, 2025
- Mylassa longicornis Sassi, 2025
- Mylassa mirabilis Sassi, 2025
- Mylassa monrosi Sassi, 2025
- Mylassa obliquata (Suffrian, 1863)
- Mylassa pectinicornis (Suffrian, 1866)
- Mylassa postmediana Sassi, 2025
- Mylassa rubronotata (Blanchard, 1851)

=== Synonyms ===
Mylassa chacallaoi Monrós, 1949 is a junior synonym of Mylassa obliquata (Suffrian, 1863) in Sassi, 2025. Also, Mylassa discariana Monrós, 1949 and Mylassa fasciatipennis Stål, 1857 are junior synonyms of Mylassa crassicollis (Blanchard, 1851) in Sassi, 2025. Also, Mylassa socia Stål, 1857 is a junior synonym of Mylassa rubronotata (Blanchard, 1851) in Sassi, 2025 [plus comments on the older synonym Pachybrachys aurantipennis Brèthes, 1929]).
