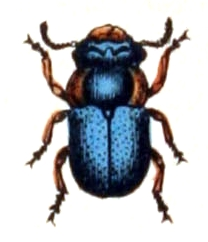
- Cheilotoma musciformis

Scientific classification
- Kingdom: Animalia
- Phylum: Arthropoda
- Clade: Pancrustacea
- Class: Insecta
- Order: Coleoptera
- Suborder: Polyphaga
- Infraorder: Cucujiformia
- Family: Chrysomelidae
- Subfamily: Cryptocephalinae
- Tribe: Clytrini
- Genus: Cheilotoma
- Species: C. musciformis

Binomial name
- Cheilotoma musciformis (Goeze, 1777)

= Cheilotoma musciformis =

Species of beetle

Cheilotoma musciformis is a species of leaf beetles from the subfamily Cryptocephalinae. It can be found in Europe from the east of France to the south of Ukraine, as well as from the north central part of Poland and the Caucasus. The species are black coloured with orange sides. It is endangered in Poland.
