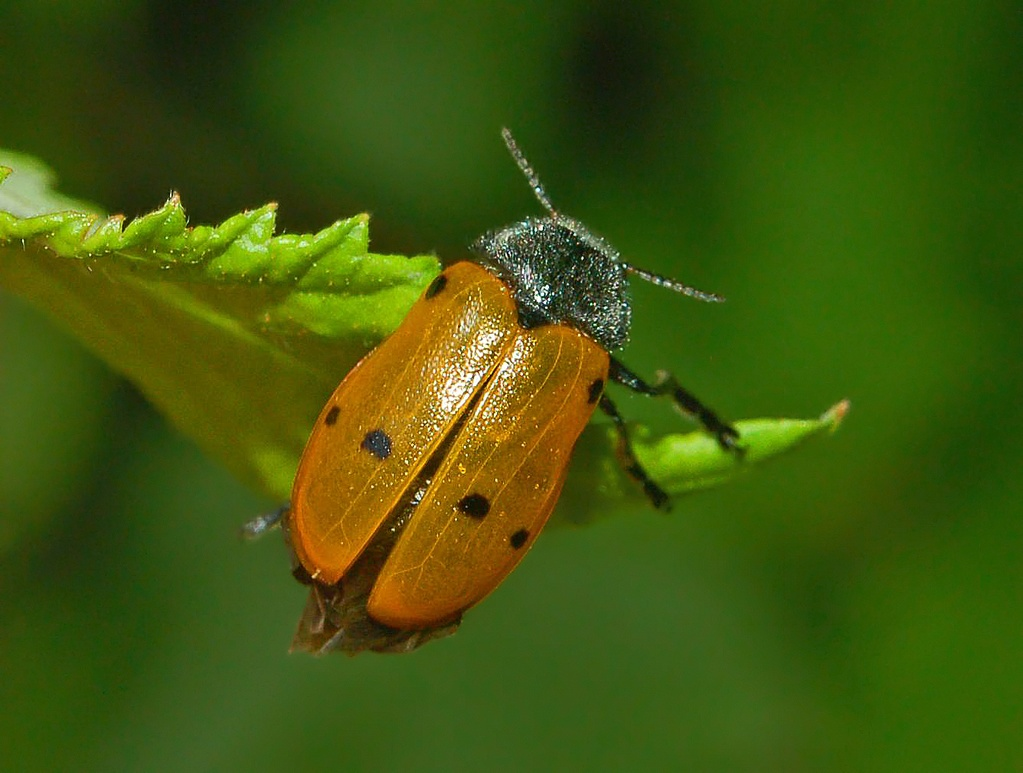
- L. italica ssp. italica
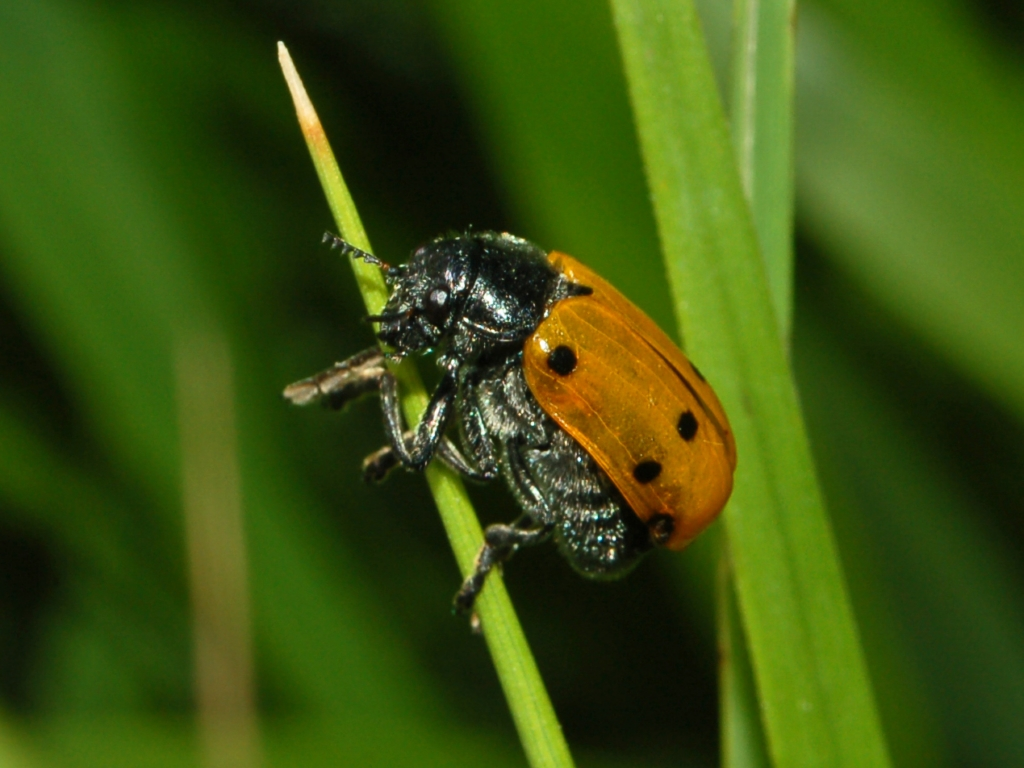
- L. italica – Lateral view

Scientific classification
- Domain: Eukaryota
- Kingdom: Animalia
- Phylum: Arthropoda
- Class: Insecta
- Order: Coleoptera
- Suborder: Polyphaga
- Infraorder: Cucujiformia
- Family: Chrysomelidae
- Subfamily: Cryptocephalinae
- Tribe: Clytrini
- Genus: Lachnaia
- Species: L. italica

Binomial name
- Lachnaia italica Weise, 1881

= Lachnaia italica =

Species of beetle

Lachnaia italica is a species of short-horned leaf beetles belonging to the family Chrysomelidae, subfamily Clytrinae.

This species is found in Italy, France, and Slovenia.

These beetles are 75–10 millimetres (2.95–0.39 in) long, the head and pronotum are black, the elytra are bright yellow-orange, with six black dots.

Adults mainly feeds on Rosaceae (Rubus) and Fagaceae (Quercus) species. Larvae live in nests of red wood ant (Formica rufa), feeding on vegetable refuses.

== Subspecies ==
- Lachnaia italica italica (Weise, 1881)
- Lachnaia italica occidentalis (Grasso, 1963)
