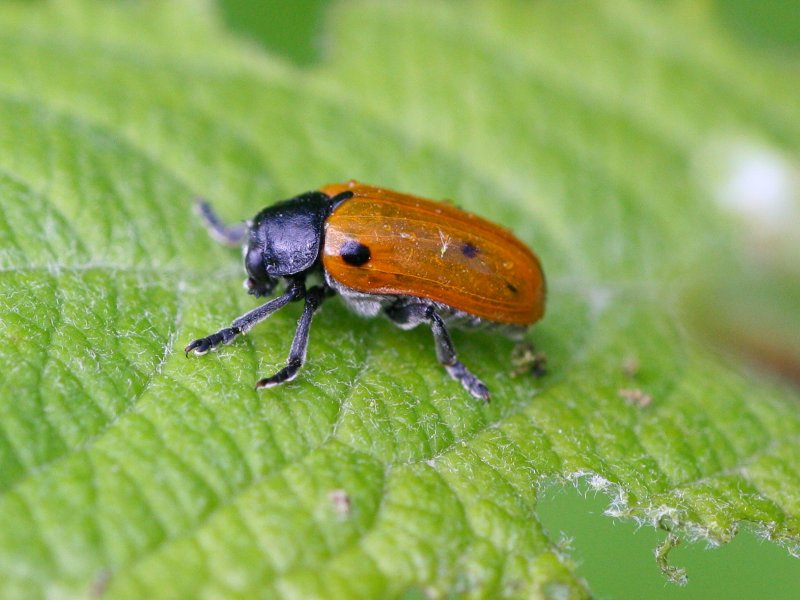
- Four spotted leaf beetle

Scientific classification
- Kingdom: Animalia
- Phylum: Arthropoda
- Clade: Pancrustacea
- Class: Insecta
- Order: Coleoptera
- Suborder: Polyphaga
- Infraorder: Cucujiformia
- Family: Chrysomelidae
- Subfamily: Cryptocephalinae
- Tribe: Clytrini
- Genus: Clytra
- Species: C. quadripunctata

Binomial name
- Clytra quadripunctata (Linnaeus, 1758)

Synonyms
- Chrysomela 4-punctata Linnaeus, 1758; Clytra (Clytra) quadrisignata Markel, 1841; Clythra appendicina Lacordaire, 1848; Clytra (Clytra) messae G. Muller, 1921; Clytra (Clytra) latina G. Muller, 1951

= Clytra quadripunctata =

Species of beetle

Clytra quadripunctata is a species of leaf beetle in the subfamily Cryptocephalinae. Its common name is Four spotted leaf beetle.

== Subspecies ==
Subspecies include:

- Clytra quadripunctata quadripunctata (Linnaeus, 1758)
- Clytra quadripunctata puberula Weise, 1898

== Distribution and habitat ==
This species is present in the western Palearctic realm from Europe (Bohemia, Moravia, France, Germany, Italy, Slovakia and the north of Spain) to Mongolia. They can be found on woody plants, roadside edges, dry grasslands and forest edges.

== Description ==
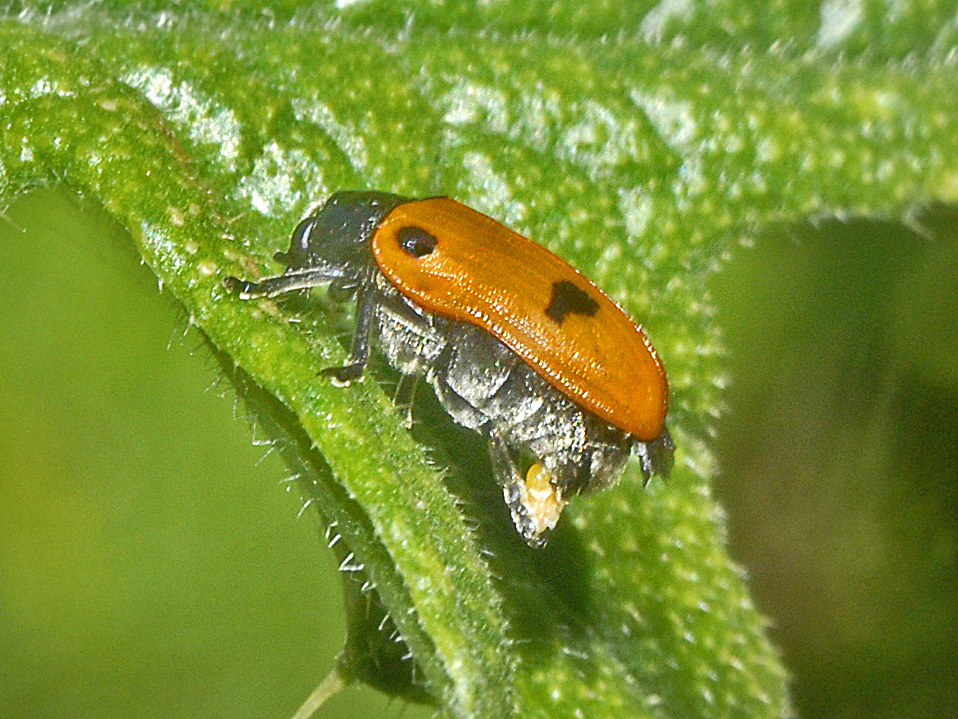
Female of Clytra quadripunctata laying eggs

Clytra quadripunctata can reach a body length of about 8–10 mm (0.31–0.39 in). These beetles show 4 black spots on the yellow-red wing covers. This species is very similar to Clytra laeviuscula, but Clytra quadripunctata has rounded and smaller posterior spots on the elytra.

The main criterion for distinguishing the two species is located in the center of the pronotum: it is regularly punctate in Clytra quadripunctata and not shiny, but smooth and shiny in Clytra laeviuscula.

== Biology ==
Adults can be found from April to the end of August. This species of beetle is common in the spring on the flowering blackberry bushes and consumes the fruit. They feed on the leaves of various plants, including: Dactylis glomerata, Pteridium aquilinum, hawthorn (Crataegus), blackthorn (Prunus), willow (Salix), birch (Betula) and oak (Quercus). These beetles lives near wood ants (genus Formica). The larvae develop in the nests of these ants.

== Bibliography ==
- Anderson, R., Nash, R. & O'Connor, J.P.. 1997, Irish Coleoptera: a revised and annotated list, Irish Naturalists' Journal Special Entomological Supplement, 1-81
- du Chatenet, G, 2000, Coléoptères Phytophages D’Europe, NAP Editions,
- Joy, N.H., 1932, A practical handbook of British beetles, H.F. & G. Witherby,
- This article has been expanded using, inter alia, material based on a translation of an article from the French Wikipedia, by the same name.

== Gallery ==
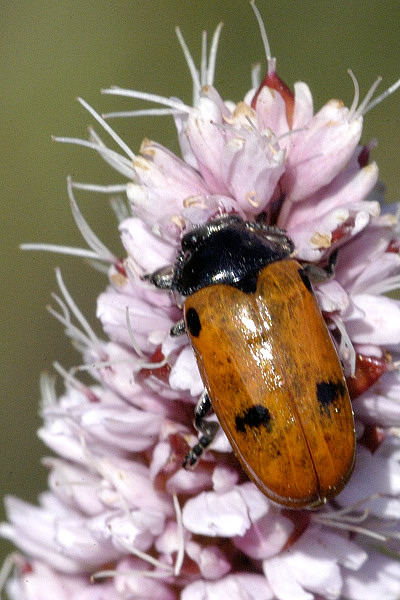

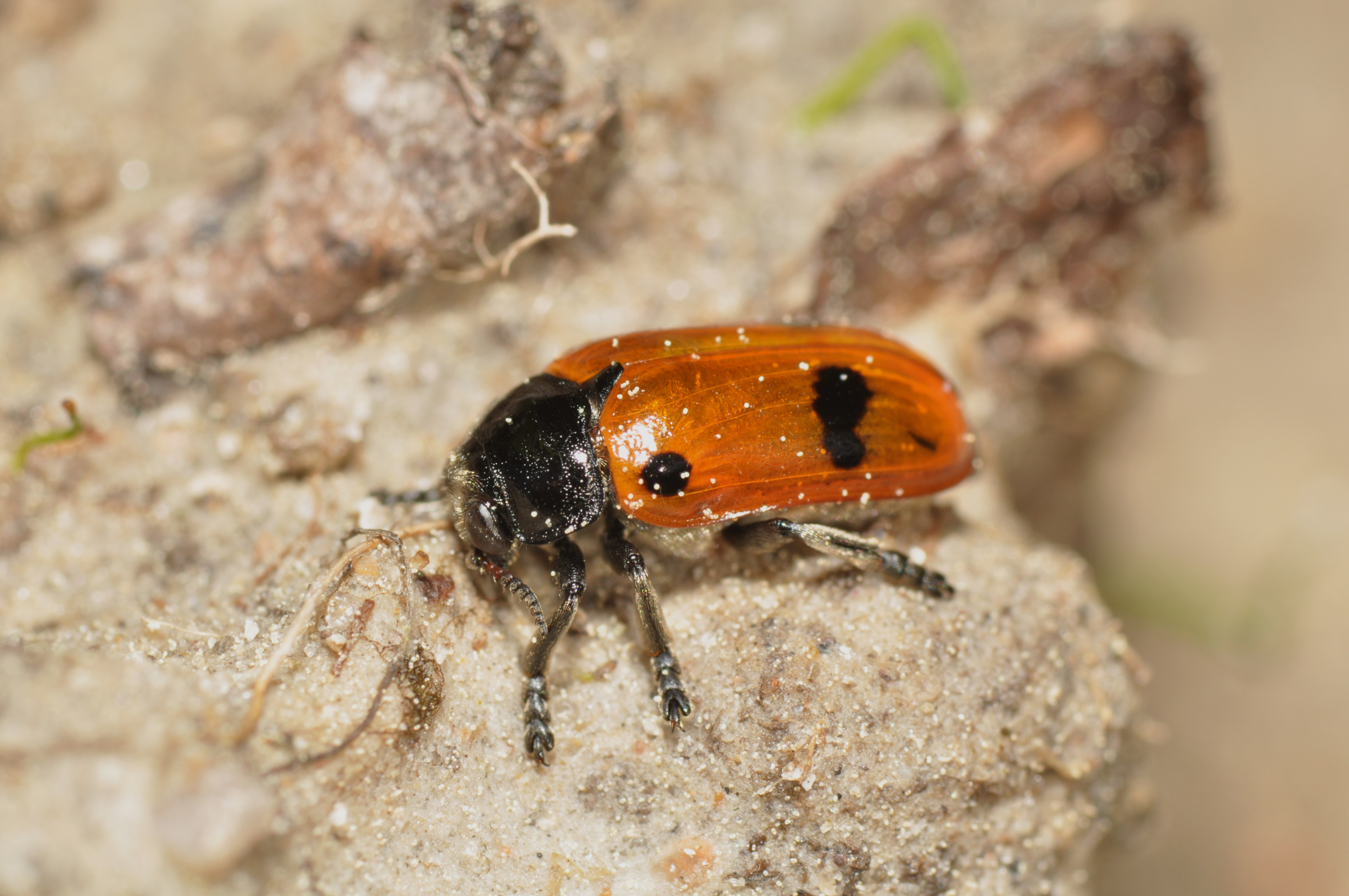

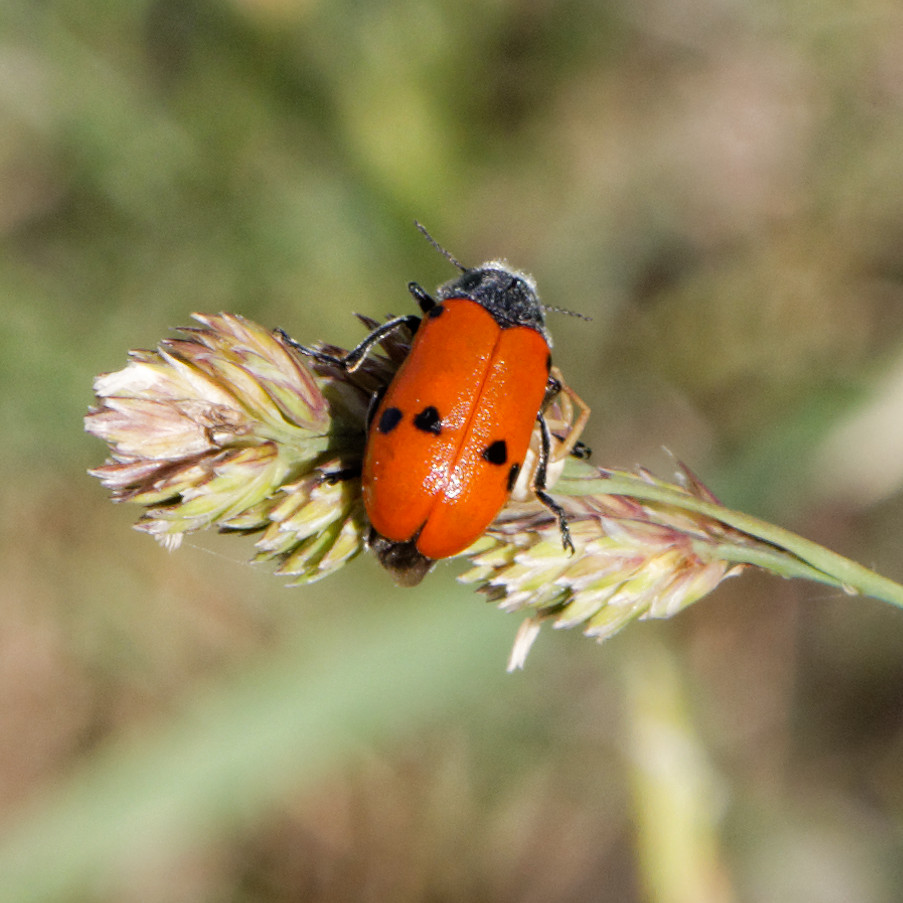

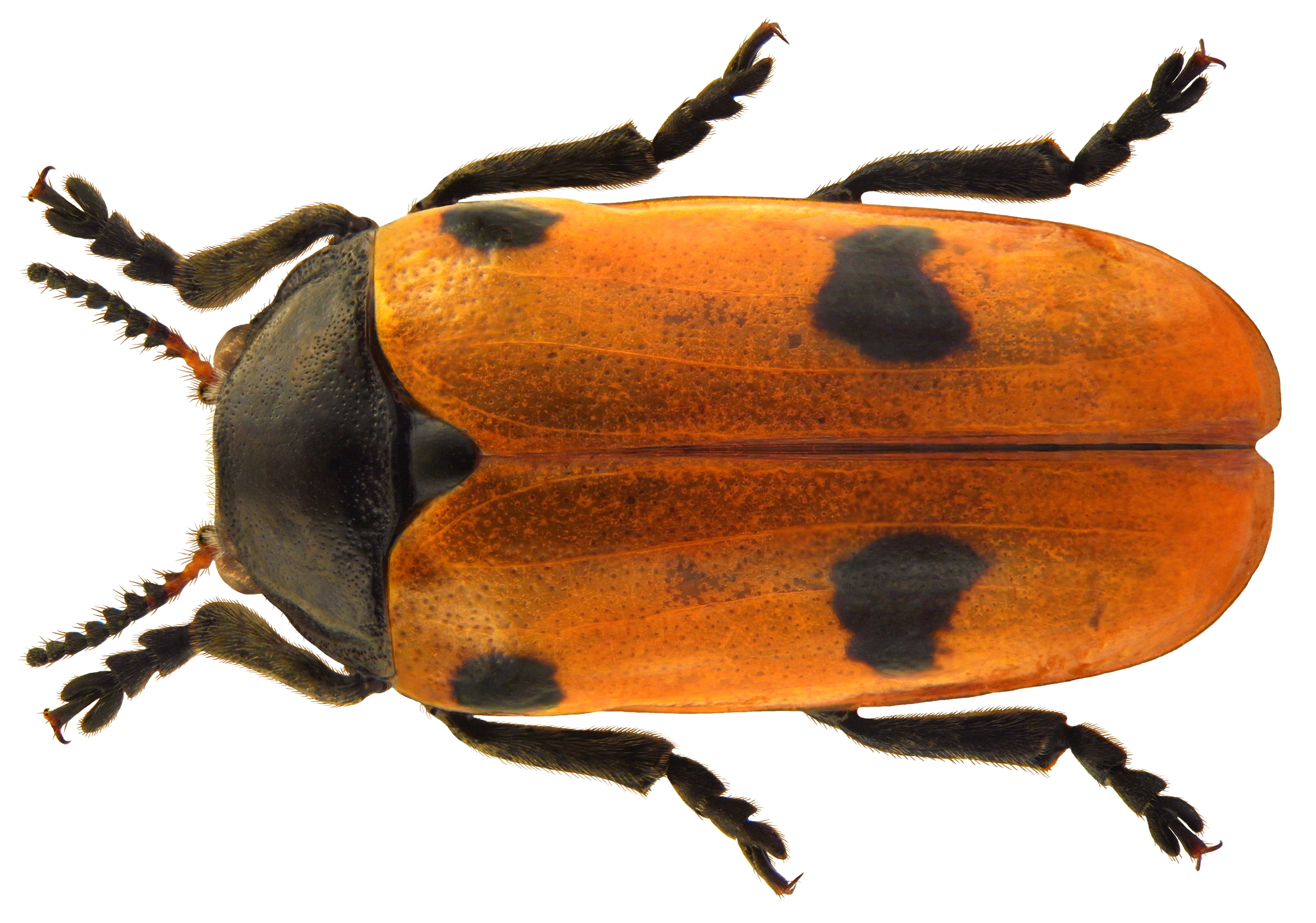
