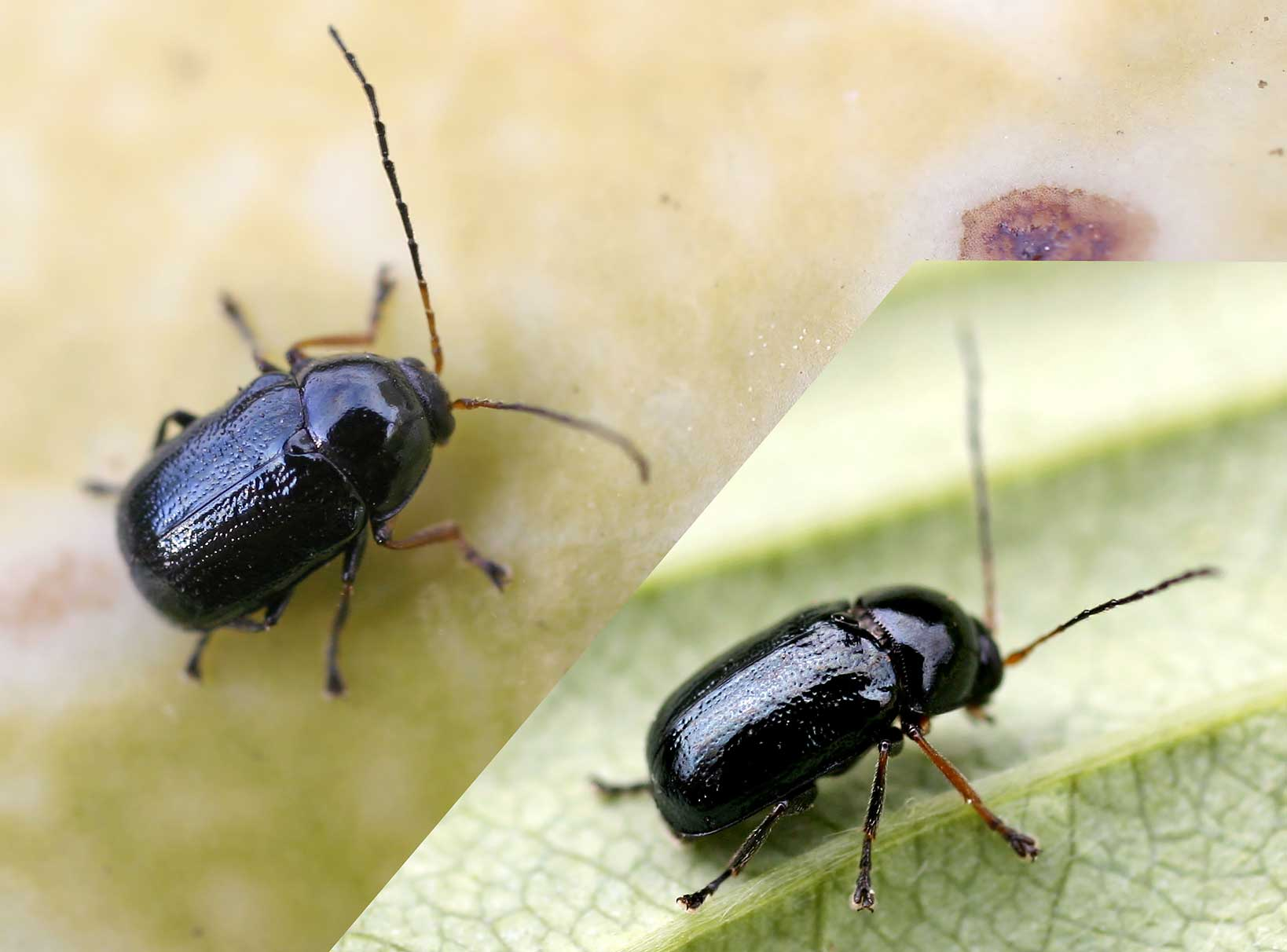
- Cryptocephalus nitidus

Scientific classification
- Kingdom: Animalia
- Phylum: Arthropoda
- Class: Insecta
- Order: Coleoptera
- Suborder: Polyphaga
- Infraorder: Cucujiformia
- Family: Chrysomelidae
- (unranked): Camptosomata
- Subfamily: Cryptocephalinae; Gyllenhaal, 1813

Tribes
- Clytrini; Cryptocephalini; Fulcidacini; Mylassini; Pachybrachini

= Cryptocephalinae =

Subfamily of beetles

The Cryptocephalinae are a subfamily of the leaf beetles (Chrysomelidae), and belong to the group of case-bearing leaf beetles called the Camptosomata. The cases are made from the feces of larvae, passed from one instar to the next, and ultimately serves as a pupation chamber.

The tribes Fulcidacini and Clytrini were formerly considered subfamilies of their own, and are presently treated only as tribes. The most recently created tribe Mylassini was erected in 2021 for the monotypic genus Mylassa.

Species in at least 14 genera of Clytrini and Cryptocephalini are myrmecophilous, living with ants. Most species exhibit polyphagy but there are patterns of constraints with certain plant lineages.

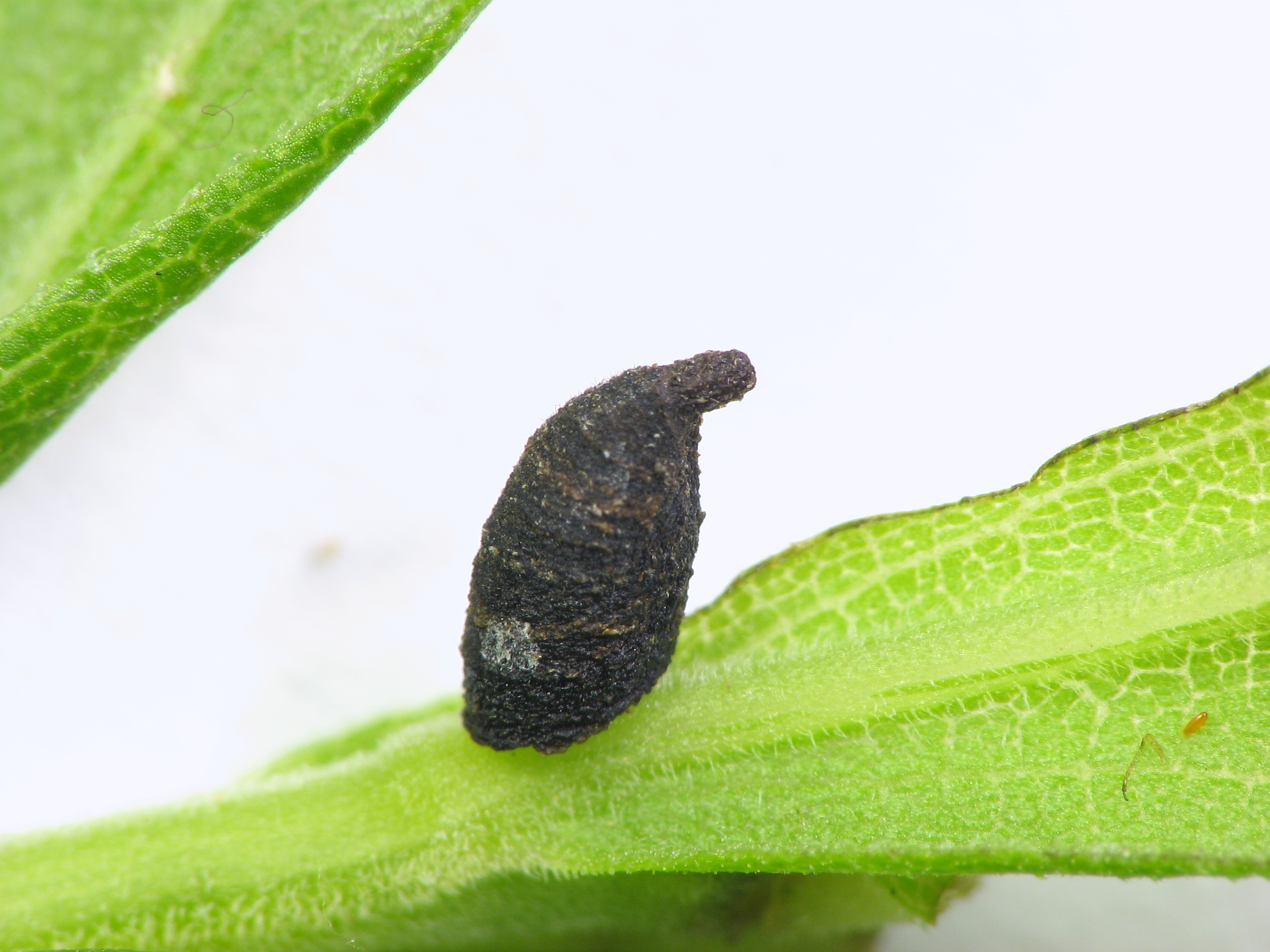
Exema, fecal case

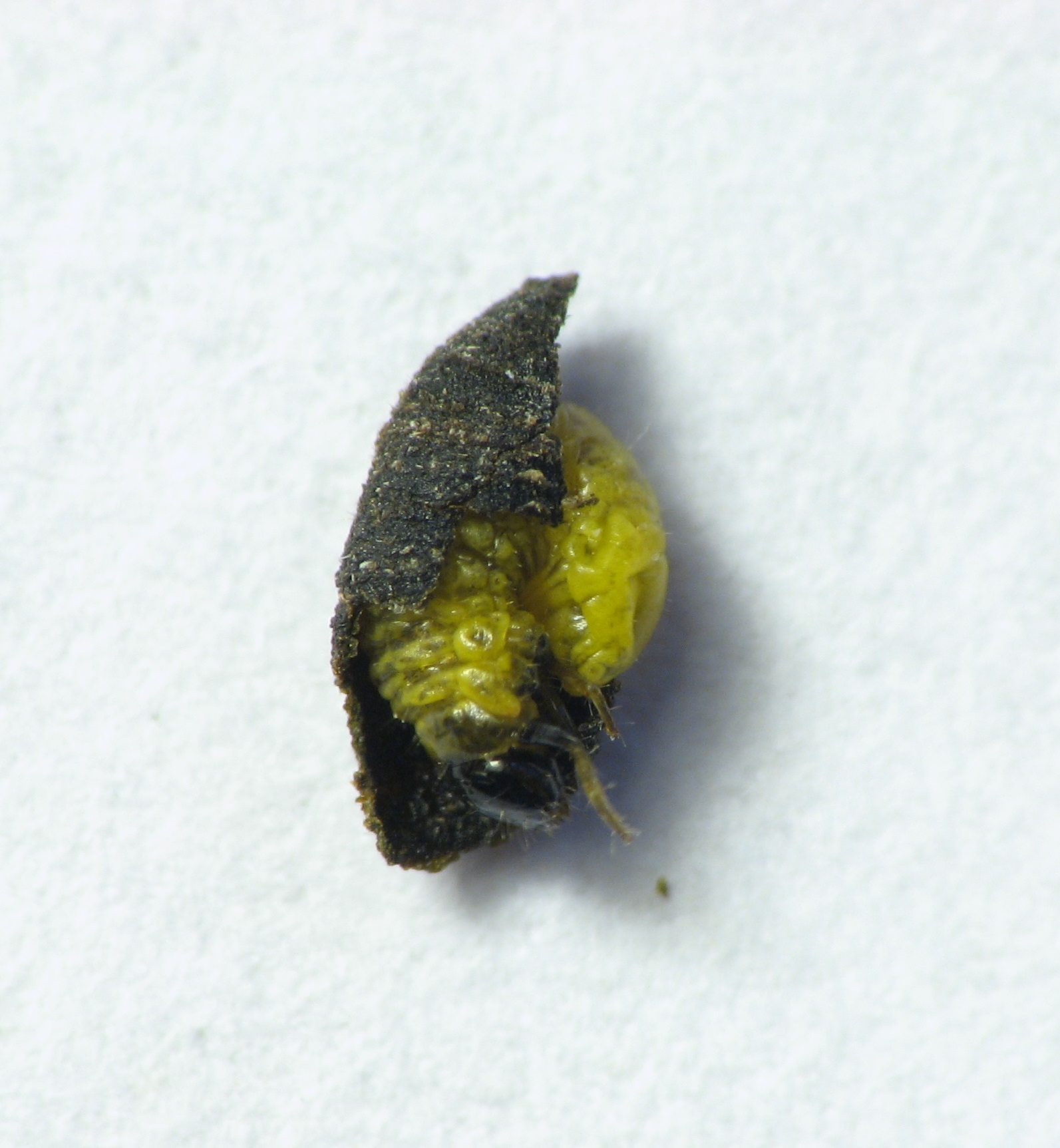
Exema, larva

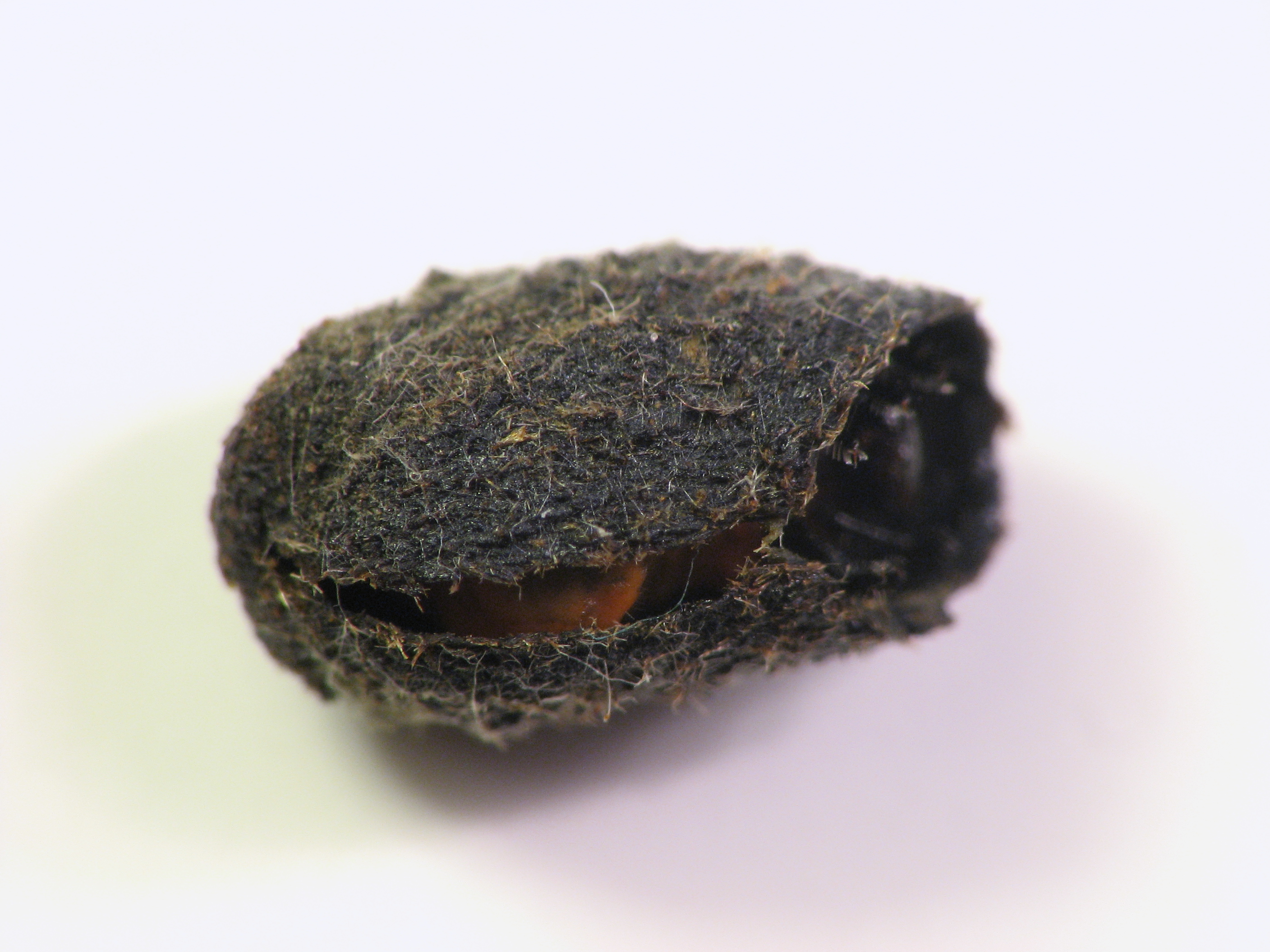
Neochlamisus, fecal case

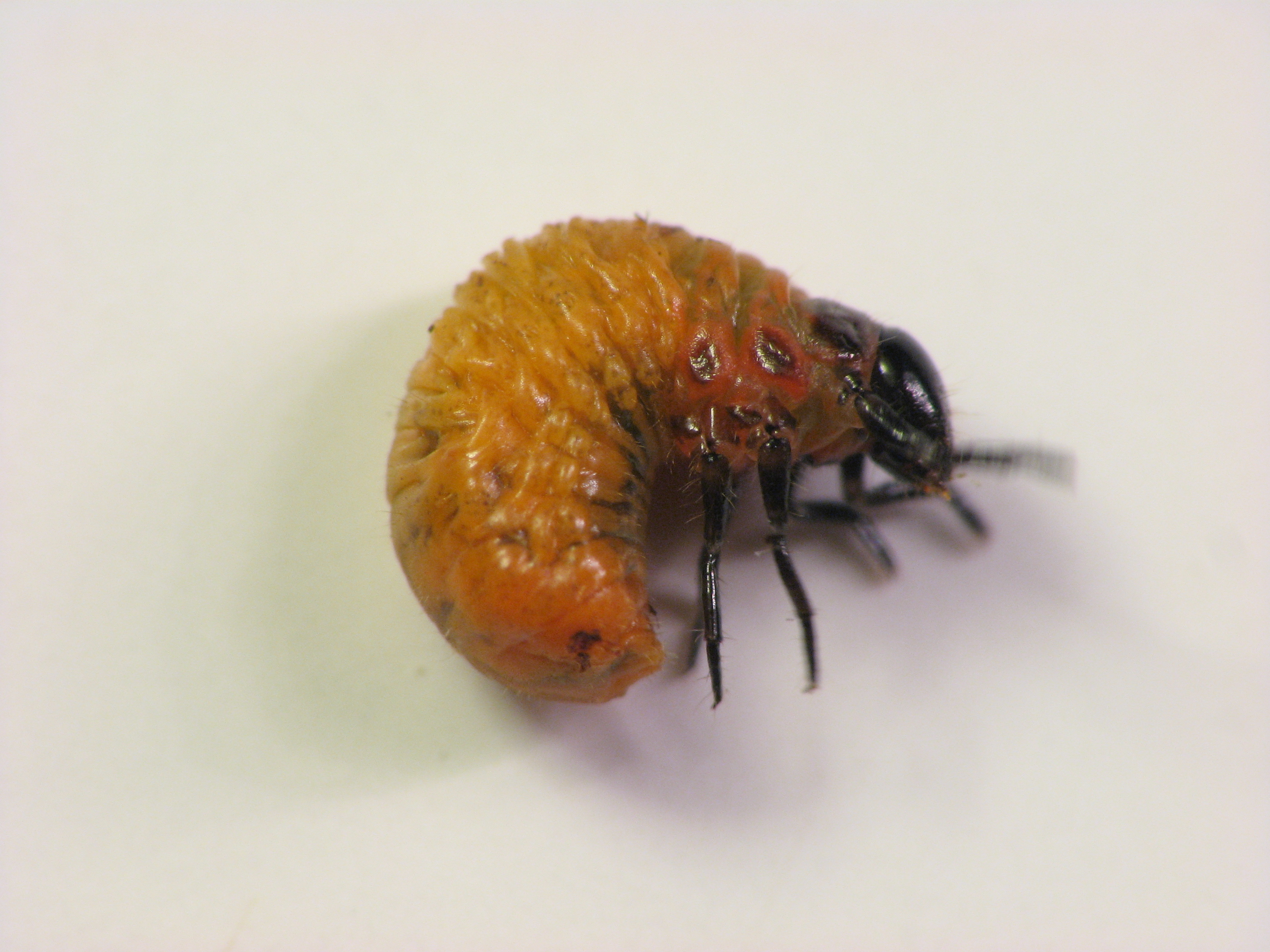
Neochlamisus, larva removed from larval fecal case
