= List of Pachybrachis species =

These 238 species belong to the genus Pachybrachis, scriptured leaf beetles.

== Pachybrachis species ==
- Pachybrachis abdominalis (Bloch & Schneider, 1801)
- Pachybrachis adspersa Suffrian, 1866
- Pachybrachis alacris Fall, 1915
- Pachybrachis alpinus Rapilly, 1982
- Pachybrachis alticola Fall, 1915
- Pachybrachis analis (Bloch, 1787)
- Pachybrachis anoguttatus Suffrian, 1866
- Pachybrachis antigae Weise, 1900
- Pachybrachis aquilonis
- Pachybrachis aragonicus Tempere & Rapilly, 1981
- Pachybrachis archboldi Barney, 2016
- Pachybrachis arizonensis Bowditch, 1909
- Pachybrachis assiettae Burlini, 1968
- Pachybrachis atomarius (F. E. Melsheimer, 1847)
- Pachybrachis azureus Suffrian, 1848
- Pachybrachis badius Fall, 1915
- Pachybrachis baeticus Weise, 1882
- Pachybrachis bajulus Suffrian, 1852
- Pachybrachis balsas Bowditch, 1909
- Pachybrachis bifasciatus Jacoby, 1880
- Pachybrachis bivittatus LINNAEUS, 1758
- Pachybrachis bloxham (A. Bloxam, 1827)
- Pachybrachis brevicollis J. L. LeConte, 1880
- Pachybrachis brevicornis Fall, 1915
- Pachybrachis brunneus (Günther, 1870)
- Pachybrachis bullatus Fall, 1915 (bubble-banded pachy)
- Pachybrachis burlinii Daccordi & Ruffo, 1971
- Pachybrachis caelatus (Valenciennes, 1840)
- Pachybrachis calcaratus Fall, 1915
- Pachybrachis calidus Fall, 1915
- Pachybrachis californicus Fall, 1915
- Pachybrachis canigouensis Lambelet, 2005
- Pachybrachis carolinensis Bowditch, 1910
- Pachybrachis carpathicus Rey, 1883
- Pachybrachis catalonicus Burlini, 1968
- Pachybrachis cephalicus Fall, 1915
- Pachybrachis chaoticus Fall, 1915
- Pachybrachis chester
- Pachybrachis cinctus Suffrian, 1848
- Pachybrachis circumcinctus (Schreber, 1775)
- Pachybrachis coloradensis Bowditch, 1909
- Pachybrachis confederatus Fall, 1915
- Pachybrachis conformis Suffrian, 1852
- Pachybrachis confusus Bowditch, 1909
- Pachybrachis congener Suffrian, 1866
- Pachybrachis connexus Fall, 1915
- Pachybrachis consimilis Fall, 1915
- Pachybrachis conspirator Fall, 1915
- Pachybrachis contractifrons Fall, 1915
- Pachybrachis convictus GÜNTHER, 1864
- Pachybrachis crassus Bowditch, 1909
- Pachybrachis creticus Weise, 1886
- Pachybrachis cribricollis Pic, 1907
- Pachybrachis croftus Bowditch, 1909
- Pachybrachis cruentus J. L. LeConte, 1880
- Pachybrachis cylindricus Bowditch, 1909
- Pachybrachis danieli Burlini, 1968
- Pachybrachis deceptor Riley & Barney, 2015
- Pachybrachis delumbis Fall, 1915
- Pachybrachis densus Bowditch, 1909
- Pachybrachis desertus Fall, 1915
- Pachybrachis deyrupi Barney, 2016
- Pachybrachis dilatatus Suffrian, 1852
- Pachybrachis discoideus Bowditch, 1909
- Pachybrachis diversus Allen & Randall, 1993
- Pachybrachis donneri Gosse, 1851
- Pachybrachis dubiosus (Cuvier, 1830)
- Pachybrachis durangoensis Jacoby, 1889
- Pachybrachis duryi Fall, 1915
- Pachybrachis eburifer Suffrian, 1866
- Pachybrachis elegans Graells, 1851
- Pachybrachis excisus Weise, 1897
- Pachybrachis exclusus Rey, 1883
- Pachybrachis femoratus (Olivier, 1808)
- Pachybrachis fimbriolatus Suffrian, 1848
- Pachybrachis flavescens Jacoby, 1889
- Pachybrachis flexuosus Weise, 1882
- Pachybrachis forreri Jacoby, 1889
- Pachybrachis fortis Fall, 1915
- Pachybrachis fractus Fall, 1915
- Pachybrachis fraudolentus G.Muller, 1955
- Pachybrachis freyi Burlini, 1957
- Pachybrachis fulvipes Suffrian, 1848
- Pachybrachis fuscipes Fall, 1915
- Pachybrachis gracilipes Fall, 1915
- Pachybrachis haematodes Suffrian, 1852 (bloody pachy)
- Pachybrachis hector Fall, 1915
- Pachybrachis hepaticus (F. E. Melsheimer, 1847)
- Pachybrachis hieroglyphicus Laicharting, 1781
- Pachybrachis hippophaes Suffrian, 1848
- Pachybrachis holerorum Montagna & Sassi
- Pachybrachis hybridus Suffrian, 1852
- Pachybrachis illectus Fall, 1915
- Pachybrachis immaculatus (Bloch & Schneider, 1801)
- Pachybrachis impurus Suffrian, 1852
- Pachybrachis inclusa Jacoby, 1889
- Pachybrachis insidiosus Fall, 1915
- Pachybrachis integratus Fall, 1915
- Pachybrachis jacobyi Soto-Adames & Taylor
- Pachybrachis juquilensis Jacoby, 1889
- Pachybrachis karamani Weise, 1893
- Pachybrachis kentuckyensis Riley & Barney, 2015
- Pachybrachis korbi Weise, 1891
- Pachybrachis kraatzi Weise, 1882
- Pachybrachis lachrymosus Fall, 1915
- Pachybrachis laetificus Marseul, 1875
- Pachybrachis laevis Bowditch, 1909
- Pachybrachis laticollis Suffrian, 1860
- Pachybrachis latithorax Clavareau, 1913
- Pachybrachis leonardii Sassi & Scholler, 2003
- Pachybrachis liebecki Fall, 1915
- Pachybrachis limbatus (Menetries, 1836)
- Pachybrachis lindbergi Burlini, 1963
- Pachybrachis lineolatus Suffrian, 1848
- Pachybrachis litigiosus Suffrian, 1852
- Pachybrachis livens J. L. LeConte, 1858
- Pachybrachis lodingi Bowditch, 1909
- Pachybrachis longus Bowditch, 1909
- Pachybrachis luctuosus Suffrian, 1858
- Pachybrachis luridus (Fabricius, 1798)
- Pachybrachis lustrans J. L. LeConte, 1880
- Pachybrachis macronychus (Germar, 1824)
- Pachybrachis maculicollis Jacoby, 1889
- Pachybrachis marginatus Bowditch, 1909
- Pachybrachis marginipennis Bowditch, 1909
- Pachybrachis marmoratus Jacoby, 1889
- Pachybrachis melanostictus Suffrian, 1852
- Pachybrachis mellitus Trewavas, 1935
- Pachybrachis mercurialis Fall, 1915
- Pachybrachis microps Fall, 1915
- Pachybrachis minor Bowditch, 1909
- Pachybrachis minutus Jacoby, 1889
- Pachybrachis mitis Fall, 1915
- Pachybrachis m-nigrum (F. E. Melsheimer, 1847)
- Pachybrachis mobilis Fall, 1915
- Pachybrachis morosus Simon, 1886
- Pachybrachis nero (Cuvier, 1832)
- Pachybrachis nigricornis (Say, 1824)
- Pachybrachis nigropunctatus Suffrian, 1854
- Pachybrachis nobilis Fall, 1915
- Pachybrachis nogalicus Fall, 1915
- Pachybrachis notatus Bowditch, 1910
- Pachybrachis nubigenus Fall, 1915
- Pachybrachis nubilis Bowditch, 1909
- Pachybrachis nunenmacheri Fall, 1915
- Pachybrachis obfuscatus Fall, 1915
- Pachybrachis obsoletus Suffrian, 1852
- Pachybrachis osceola Fall, 1915
- Pachybrachis osellai Daccordi & Ruffo, 1975
- Pachybrachis othonus (Say, 1825)
- Pachybrachis pagana Olivier, 1808
- Pachybrachis pallidulus Suffrian, 1851
- Pachybrachis parvinotatus Fall, 1915
- Pachybrachis pawnee Bloch & Schneider, 1801
- Pachybrachis peccans Suffrian, 1852
- Pachybrachis pectoralis (F. E. Melsheimer, 1847)
- Pachybrachis petitpierrei Daccordi, 1976
- Pachybrachis petronius Fall, 1915
- Pachybrachis picturatus (Ayres, 1855)
- Pachybrachis picus Weise, 1882
- Pachybrachis pinguescens Fall, 1915
- Pachybrachis pinicola Medvedev in Rouse and Medvedev, 1972
- Pachybrachis placidus Fall, 1915
- Pachybrachis planifrons Wagner, 1927
- Pachybrachis pluripunctatus Fall, 1915
- Pachybrachis postfasciatus Fall, 1915
- Pachybrachis posticus Suffrian, 1852
- Pachybrachis pradensis Marseul, 1875
- Pachybrachis praeclarus Weise, 1913
- Pachybrachis precarius Fall, 1915
- Pachybrachis prosopis Fall, 1915
- Pachybrachis proximus Bowditch, 1909
- Pachybrachis pteromelas Graells, 1858
- Pachybrachis pulvinatus Suffrian, 1852
- Pachybrachis punctatus Bowditch, 1909
- Pachybrachis puncticollis Bowditch, 1909
- Pachybrachis punicus Fall, 1915
- Pachybrachis purus Fall, 1915
- Pachybrachis pusillus Bowditch, 1909
- Pachybrachis quadratus Fall, 1915
- Pachybrachis quadricollis Suffrian, 1866
- Pachybrachis quadrioculatus Fall, 1915
- Pachybrachis regius Schaufuss, 1862
- Pachybrachis relictus Fall, 1915
- Pachybrachis rondanus Burlini, 1968
- Pachybrachis ruffoi Burlini, 1956
- Pachybrachis rugifer Abeille de Perrin, 1905
- Pachybrachis salfii Burlini, 1957
- Pachybrachis sallaei Jacoby, 1889
- Pachybrachis sanrita Bowditch, 1909
- Pachybrachis scripticollis Faldermann, 1837
- Pachybrachis scriptidorsum Marseul, 1875
- Pachybrachis scriptus Herrich-Schäffer, 1838
- Pachybrachis siculus Weise, 1891
- Pachybrachis signatifrons Mannerheim, 1843
- Pachybrachis signatus Bowditch, 1909
- Pachybrachis simius Marseul, 1875
- Pachybrachis sinuatus Mulsant & Rey, 1859
- Pachybrachis snowi Bowditch, 1909
- Pachybrachis sonorensis Jacoby, 1889
- Pachybrachis spumarius Suffrian, 1852
- Pachybrachis stygicus Fall, 1915
- Pachybrachis subfasciatus (J. E. LeConte, 1824)
- Pachybrachis sublimatus Fall, 1915
- Pachybrachis subvittatus J. L. LeConte, 1880
- Pachybrachis suffrianii Schaufuss, 1862
- Pachybrachis suturalis (Weise, 1882)
- Pachybrachis tacitus Moore, 1988
- Pachybrachis terminalis Suffrian, 1849
- Pachybrachis tessellatus (Olivier, 1791)
- Pachybrachis testaceus Perris, 1865
- Pachybrachis texanus Bowditch, 1909
- Pachybrachis thoracicus Linnaeus, 1758
- Pachybrachis tridens (F. E. Melsheimer, 1847)
- Pachybrachis trinotatus (F. E. Melsheimer, 1847)
- Pachybrachis trivittatus Bowditch, 1910
- Pachybrachis truncatus Bowditch, 1909
- Pachybrachis tumidus Bowditch, 1909
- Pachybrachis turbidus
- Pachybrachis turgidicollis Fall, 1915
- Pachybrachis tybeensis Fall, 1915
- Pachybrachis umbraculatus Guenée, 1868
- Pachybrachis uncinatus Fall, 1915
- Pachybrachis uteanus Dejean
- Pachybrachis vacillatus Fall, 1915
- Pachybrachis varians Bowditch, 1909
- Pachybrachis varicolor Suffrian, 1852
- Pachybrachis vau Denis & Schiffermüller, 1775
- Pachybrachis vermicularis Suffrian, 1854
- Pachybrachis vestigialis Fall, 1915
- Pachybrachis viduatus (Zetterstedt, 1838)
- Pachybrachis viedmai Burlini, 1968
- Pachybrachis virgatus Kunth
- Pachybrachis vulnerosus Fall, 1915
- Pachybrachis wenzeli Fall, 1915
- Pachybrachis wickhami Bowditch, 1909
- Pachybrachis xantholucens Fall, 1915
- Pachybrachis xanti Gill, 1860
