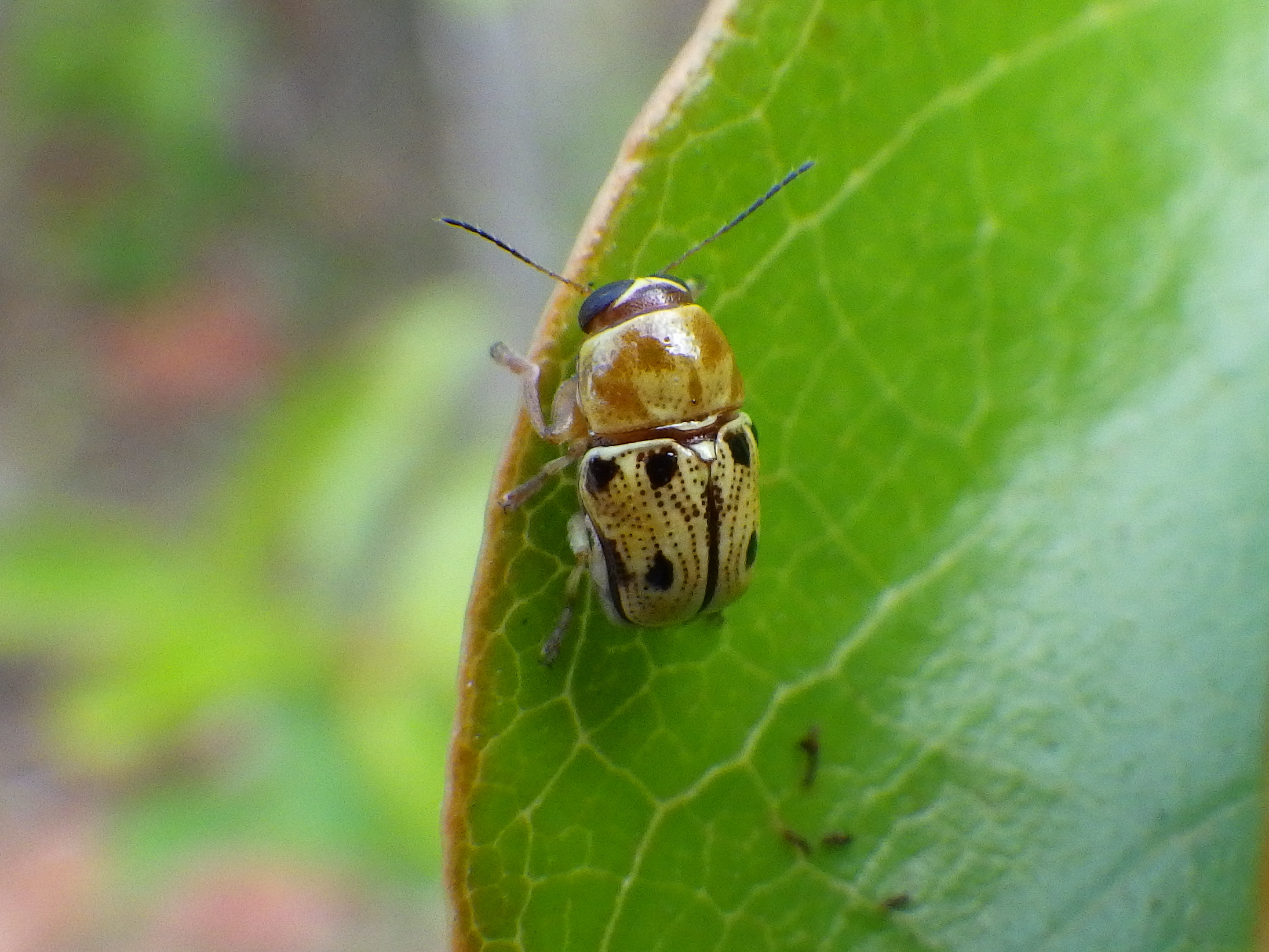
- G. larvatus in Key Largo, Florida

Scientific classification
- Kingdom: Animalia
- Phylum: Arthropoda
- Clade: Pancrustacea
- Class: Insecta
- Order: Coleoptera
- Suborder: Polyphaga
- Infraorder: Cucujiformia
- Family: Chrysomelidae
- Genus: Griburius
- Species: G. larvatus

Binomial name
- Griburius larvatus (Newman, 1840)

= Griburius larvatus =

Species of beetle

Griburius larvatus is a species of case-bearing leaf beetle in the family Chrysomelidae. It is found in North America.

Its size ranges from 4.32 to 5.6 millimeters.
