= Pachybrachis hepaticus =

Scientific classification
- Kingdom: Animalia
- Phylum: Arthropoda
- Clade: Pancrustacea
- Class: Insecta
- Order: Coleoptera
- Suborder: Polyphaga
- Infraorder: Cucujiformia
- Family: Chrysomelidae
- Genus: Pachybrachis
- Species: P. hepaticus

Binomial name
- Pachybrachis hepaticus (F. E. Melsheimer, 1847)

Species of beetle

Pachybrachis hepaticus is a species of case-bearing leaf beetle in the family Chrysomelidae. It is found in Central America and North America.

== Subspecies ==
These two subspecies belong to the species Pachybrachis hepaticus:

- Pachybrachis hepaticus hepaticus (F. E. Melsheimer, 1847)^{i c g}
- Pachybrachis hepaticus heteroderus Fall, 1915^{i c g}

Data sources: i = ITIS, c = Catalogue of Life, g = GBIF, b = Bugguide.net
