= Griburius lecontii =

Scientific classification
- Kingdom: Animalia
- Phylum: Arthropoda
- Clade: Pancrustacea
- Class: Insecta
- Order: Coleoptera
- Suborder: Polyphaga
- Infraorder: Cucujiformia
- Family: Chrysomelidae
- Genus: Griburius
- Species: G. lecontii

Binomial name
- Griburius lecontii Crotch, 1873

Species of beetle

Griburius lecontii is a species of case-bearing leaf beetle in the family Chrysomelidae. It is found in North America.
