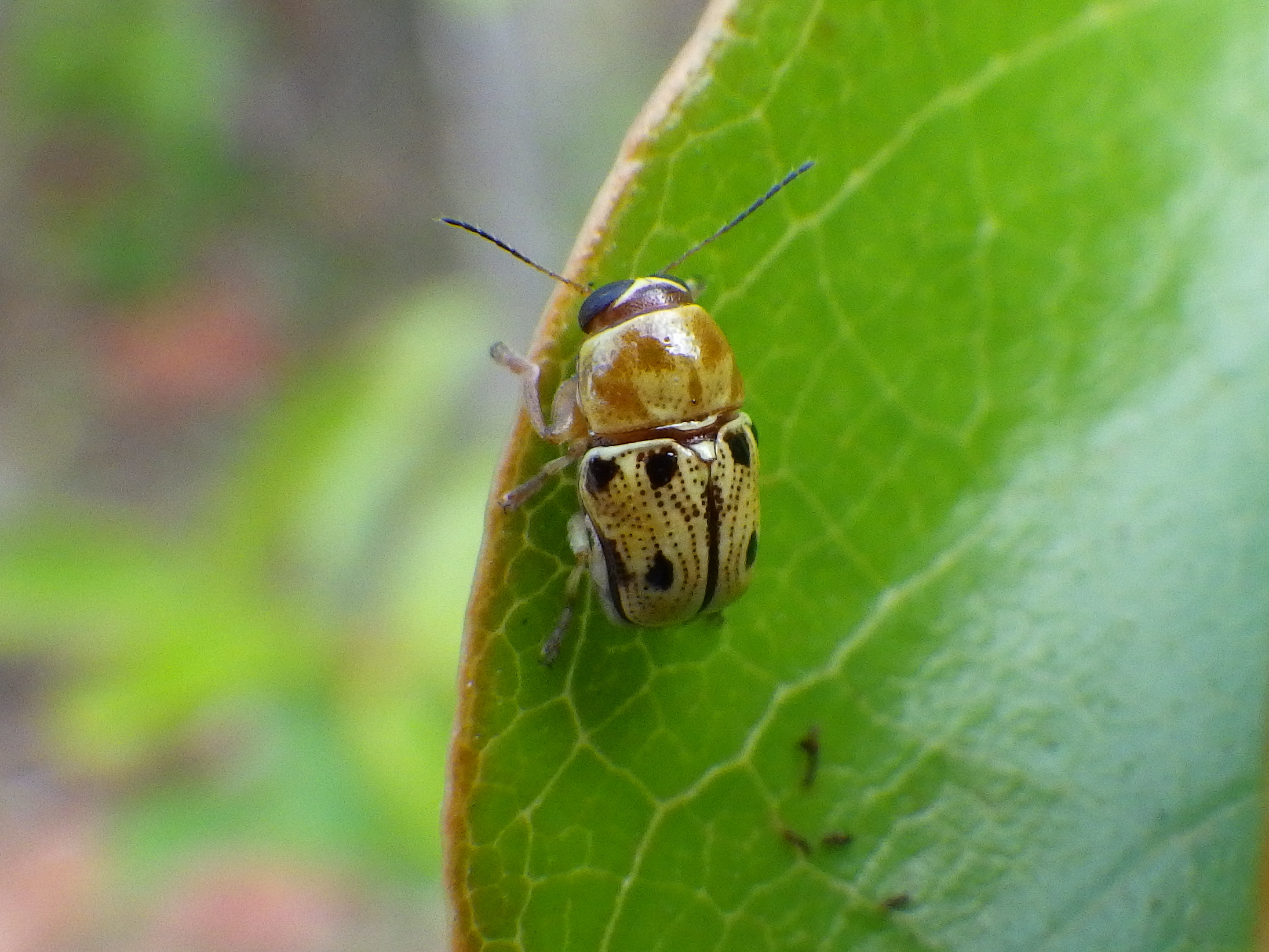
- G. larvatus in Key Largo, Florida

Scientific classification
- Kingdom: Animalia
- Phylum: Arthropoda
- Clade: Pancrustacea
- Class: Insecta
- Order: Coleoptera
- Suborder: Polyphaga
- Infraorder: Cucujiformia
- Family: Chrysomelidae
- Subfamily: Cryptocephalinae
- Tribe: Pachybrachini
- Genus: Griburius; Haldeman, 1849

= Griburius =

Genus of beetles

Griburius is a genus of case-bearing leaf beetles in the family Chrysomelidae. There are many species, with about six described species that occur in the US.

== Species [select few predominant in USA] ==
- Griburius equestris (Olivier, 1808)
- Griburius larvatus (Newman, 1840)
- Griburius lecontii Crotch, 1873
- Griburius montezuma (Suffrian, 1852)
- Griburius rileyi Sassi, 2023
- Griburius scutellaris Fabricius, 1801
