= Griburius montezuma =

Scientific classification
- Kingdom: Animalia
- Phylum: Arthropoda
- Clade: Pancrustacea
- Class: Insecta
- Order: Coleoptera
- Suborder: Polyphaga
- Infraorder: Cucujiformia
- Family: Chrysomelidae
- Genus: Griburius
- Species: G. montezuma

Binomial name
- Griburius montezuma (Suffrian, 1852)

Species of beetle

Griburius montezuma is a species of case-bearing leaf beetle in the family Chrysomelidae. It is found in Central America and North America.
