= Pachybrachis spumarius =

Scientific classification
- Kingdom: Animalia
- Phylum: Arthropoda
- Clade: Pancrustacea
- Class: Insecta
- Order: Coleoptera
- Suborder: Polyphaga
- Infraorder: Cucujiformia
- Family: Chrysomelidae
- Genus: Pachybrachis
- Species: P. spumarius

Binomial name
- Pachybrachis spumarius Suffrian, 1852

Species of beetle

Pachybrachis spumarius is a species of case-bearing leaf beetle in the family Chrysomelidae. It is found in North America.

Associated with plants; recorded as having been collected from Rhus typhina (Anacardiaceae), Rhus copallina, Rhus glabra, Acer rubrum (Aceraceae), Quercus alba (Fagaceae), and Betula papyrifera (Betulaceae). The species was first described in 1852 by the entomologist E. Suffrian.
