= Griburius scutellaris =

Scientific classification
- Kingdom: Animalia
- Phylum: Arthropoda
- Clade: Pancrustacea
- Class: Insecta
- Order: Coleoptera
- Suborder: Polyphaga
- Infraorder: Cucujiformia
- Family: Chrysomelidae
- Genus: Griburius
- Species: G. scutellaris

Binomial name
- Griburius scutellaris (Fabricius, 1801)

Species of beetle

Griburius scutellaris is a species in the family Chrysomelidae ("leaf beetles"), in the order Coleoptera ("beetles"). It is found in North America.
