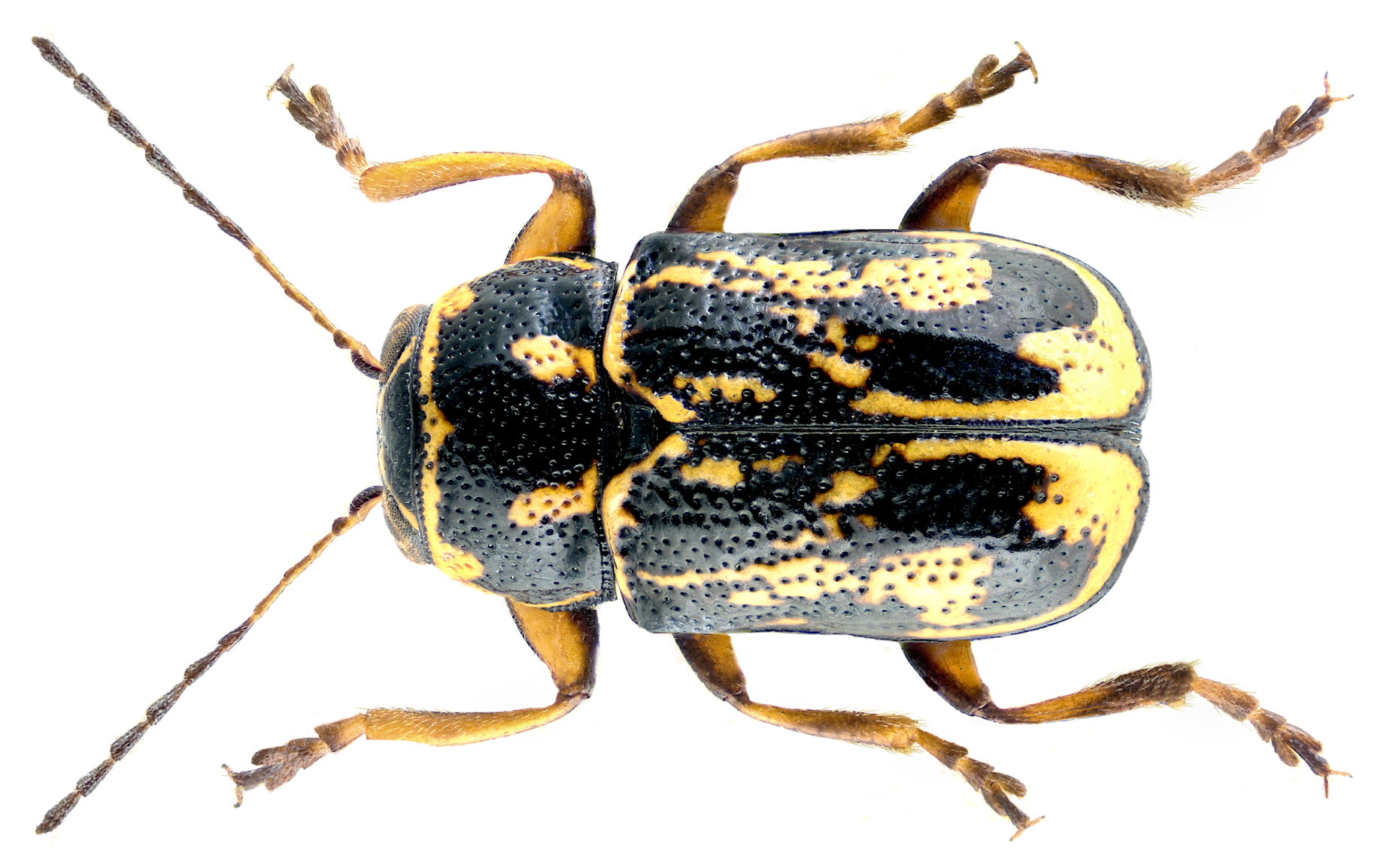
- Pachybrachis hieroglyphicus

Scientific classification
- Kingdom: Animalia
- Phylum: Arthropoda
- Clade: Pancrustacea
- Class: Insecta
- Order: Coleoptera
- Suborder: Polyphaga
- Infraorder: Cucujiformia
- Family: Chrysomelidae
- Subfamily: Cryptocephalinae
- Tribe: Pachybrachini; Chapuis, 1874

Genera
- See text

= Pachybrachini =

Tribe of beetles

The Pachybrachini are a tribe within the leaf beetle subfamily Cryptocephalinae, described by Chapuis, 1874. They were formerly classified as the subtribe Pachybrachina within the tribe Cryptocephalini. In a molecular analysis published in 2021, Cryptocephalini including Pachybrachina was recovered as paraphyletic, so the authors separated Pachybrachina from Cryptocephalini as a separate tribe.

== Selected genera ==
- Acolastus Gerstaecker, 1855
- Ambrotodes Suffrian, 1866
- Griburius Haldeman, 1849
- Mastacanthus Suffrian, 1852
- Metallactus Suffrian, 1866
- Pachybrachis Chevrolat, 1836
- Sternoglossus Suffrian, 1866
