= Pachybrachis brevicollis =

Scientific classification
- Kingdom: Animalia
- Phylum: Arthropoda
- Clade: Pancrustacea
- Class: Insecta
- Order: Coleoptera
- Suborder: Polyphaga
- Infraorder: Cucujiformia
- Family: Chrysomelidae
- Genus: Pachybrachis
- Species: P. brevicollis

Binomial name
- Pachybrachis brevicollis J. L. LeConte, 1880

Species of beetle

Pachybrachis brevicollis is a species in the subfamily Cryptocephalinae ("case-bearing leaf beetles"), in the suborder Polyphaga ("water, rove, scarab, long-horned, leaf and snout beetles"). It is found in North America.
