= Pachybrachis othonus =

Scientific classification
- Kingdom: Animalia
- Phylum: Arthropoda
- Clade: Pancrustacea
- Class: Insecta
- Order: Coleoptera
- Suborder: Polyphaga
- Infraorder: Cucujiformia
- Family: Chrysomelidae
- Genus: Pachybrachis
- Species: P. othonus

Binomial name
- Pachybrachis othonus (Say, 1825)

Species of beetle

Pachybrachis othonus is a species of case-bearing leaf beetle in the family Chrysomelidae. It is found in North America.

== Subspecies ==
These three subspecies belong to the species Pachybrachis othonus:

- Pachybrachis othonus othonus (Say, 1825)
- Pachybrachis othonus pallidipennis Suffrian, 1858
- Pachybrachis othonus sioux Balsbaugh, 1973
