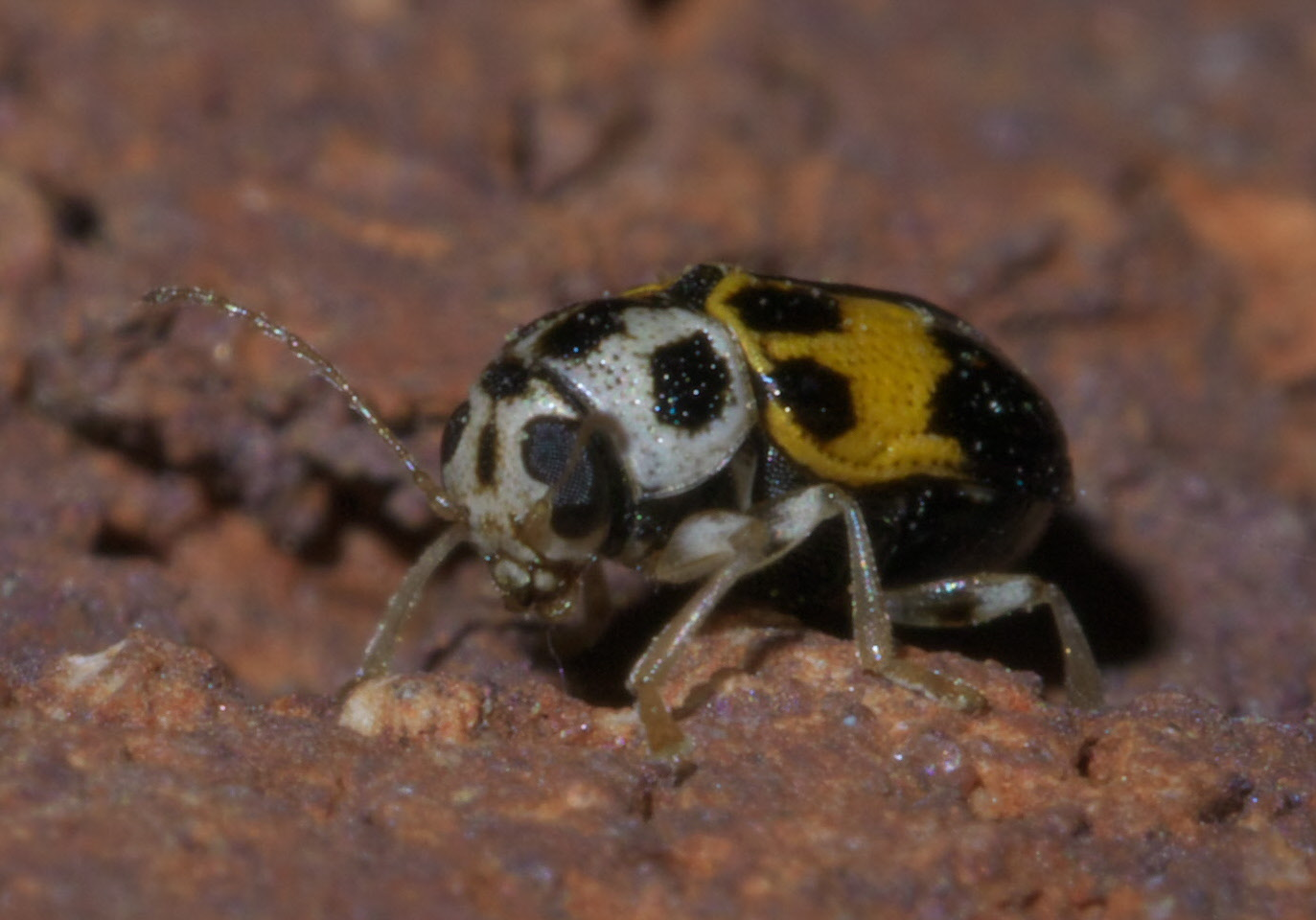

Scientific classification
- Kingdom: Animalia
- Phylum: Arthropoda
- Clade: Pancrustacea
- Class: Insecta
- Order: Coleoptera
- Suborder: Polyphaga
- Infraorder: Cucujiformia
- Family: Chrysomelidae
- Genus: Pachybrachis
- Species: P. tridens

Binomial name
- Pachybrachis tridens (F. E. Melsheimer, 1847)

= Pachybrachis tridens =

Species of beetle

Pachybrachis tridens is a species of case-bearing leaf beetle in the family Chrysomelidae. It is found in North America.

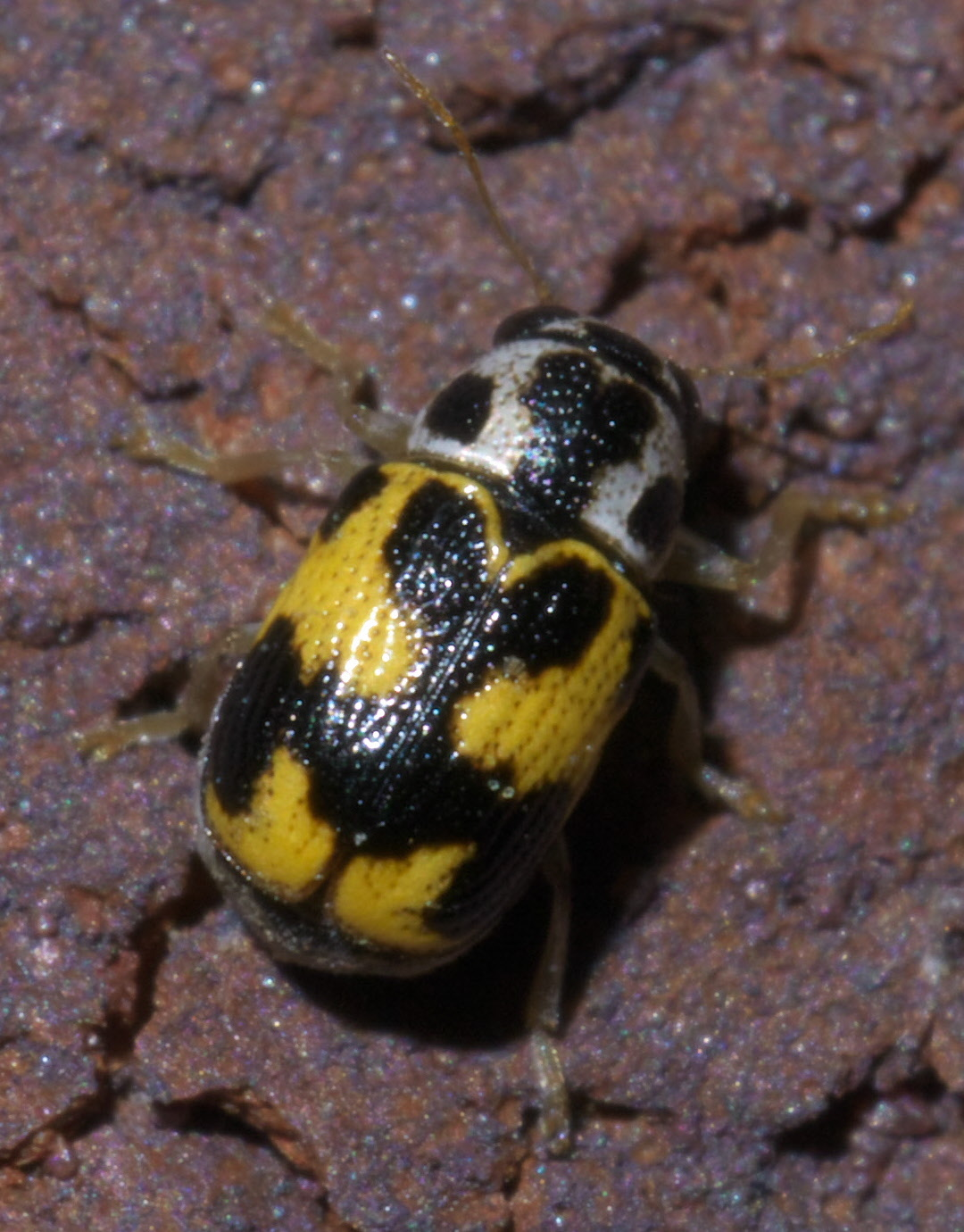
