= Pachybrachis vestigialis =

Scientific classification
- Kingdom: Animalia
- Phylum: Arthropoda
- Clade: Pancrustacea
- Class: Insecta
- Order: Coleoptera
- Suborder: Polyphaga
- Infraorder: Cucujiformia
- Family: Chrysomelidae
- Genus: Pachybrachis
- Species: P. vestigialis

Binomial name
- Pachybrachis vestigialis Fall, 1915

Species of beetle

Pachybrachis vestigialis is a species in the family Chrysomelidae ("leaf beetles"), in the order Coleoptera ("beetles"). Pachybrachis vestigialis is found in North America.
