= Pachybrachis brevicornis =

Scientific classification
- Kingdom: Animalia
- Phylum: Arthropoda
- Clade: Pancrustacea
- Class: Insecta
- Order: Coleoptera
- Suborder: Polyphaga
- Infraorder: Cucujiformia
- Family: Chrysomelidae
- Genus: Pachybrachis
- Species: P. brevicornis

Binomial name
- Pachybrachis brevicornis Fall, 1915

Species of beetle

Pachybrachis brevicornis is a species of case-bearing leaf beetle in the family Chrysomelidae.
