= Pachybrachis nigricornis =

Scientific classification
- Kingdom: Animalia
- Phylum: Arthropoda
- Clade: Pancrustacea
- Class: Insecta
- Order: Coleoptera
- Suborder: Polyphaga
- Infraorder: Cucujiformia
- Family: Chrysomelidae
- Genus: Pachybrachis
- Species: P. nigricornis

Binomial name
- Pachybrachis nigricornis (Say, 1824)

Species of beetle

Pachybrachis nigricornis is a species of case-bearing leaf beetle in the family Chrysomelidae. It is found in Central America and North America.

== Subspecies ==
These four subspecies belong to the species Pachybrachis nigricornis:

- Pachybrachis nigricornis autolycus Fall, 1915^{i c g b}
- Pachybrachis nigricornis carbonarius Haldeman, 1849^{i c g}
- Pachybrachis nigricornis difficilis Fall, 1915^{i c g b}
- Pachybrachis nigricornis nigricornis (Say, 1824)^{i c g}

Data sources: i = ITIS, c = Catalogue of Life, g = GBIF, b = Bugguide.net
