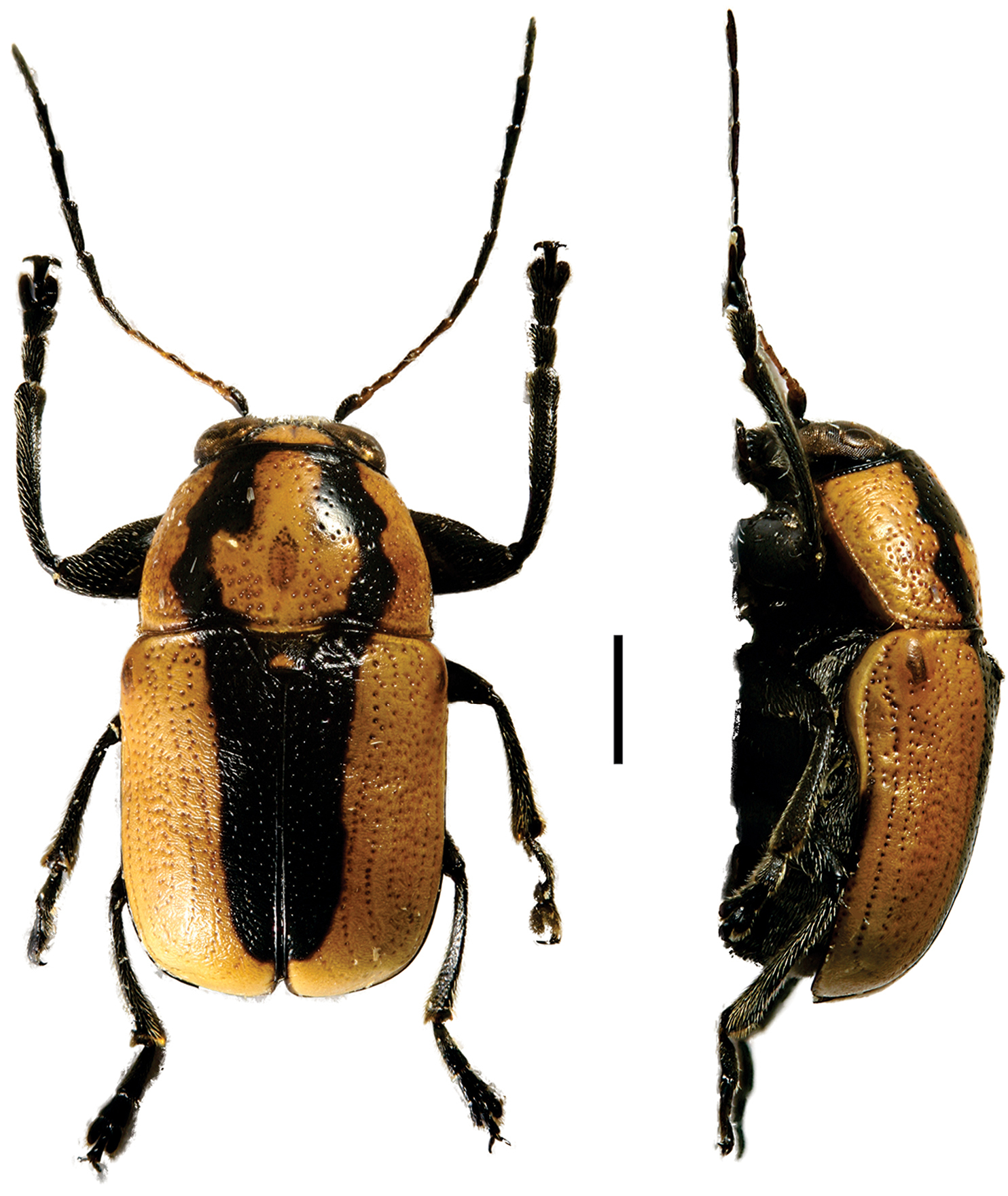
- Metallactus nigroplagiatus

Scientific classification
- Kingdom: Animalia
- Phylum: Arthropoda
- Clade: Pancrustacea
- Class: Insecta
- Order: Coleoptera
- Suborder: Polyphaga
- Infraorder: Cucujiformia
- Family: Chrysomelidae
- (unranked): Camptosomata
- Subfamily: Cryptocephalinae
- Tribe: Pachybrachini
- Genus: Metallactus; Suffrian, 1866

= Metallactus =

Genus of beetles

Metallactus is a genus of case-bearing leaf beetles in the family Chrysomelidae. There are over 70 described species distributed across South America.

== Species [selected few predominant] ==
- Metallactus generosus (Suffrian, 1866)
- Metallactus hamifer (Suffrian, 1866)
- Metallactus londonpridei Sassi, 2018
- Metallactus nigroplagiatus Sassi, 2020
- Metallactus taeniatellus (Suffrian, 1866)
