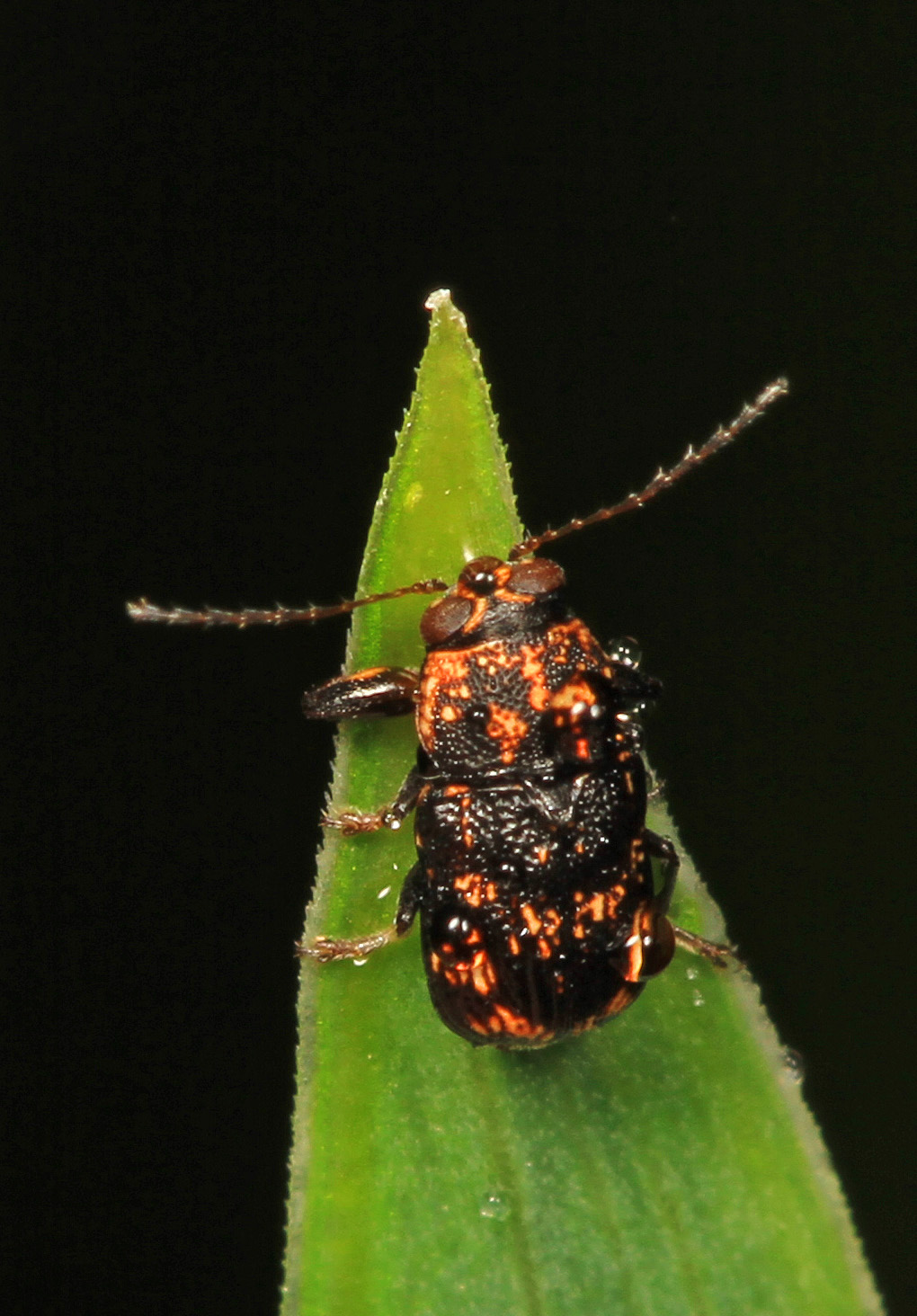
- Pachybrachis impurus

Scientific classification
- Kingdom: Animalia
- Phylum: Arthropoda
- Clade: Pancrustacea
- Class: Insecta
- Order: Coleoptera
- Suborder: Polyphaga
- Infraorder: Cucujiformia
- Family: Chrysomelidae
- Subfamily: Cryptocephalinae
- Tribe: Pachybrachini
- Genus: Pachybrachis; Chevrolat in Dejean, 1836

Diversity
- at least 220 species

= Pachybrachis =

Genus of beetles

Pachybrachis is a genus of scriptured leaf beetles in the family Chrysomelidae. There are at least 220 described species in Pachybrachis.

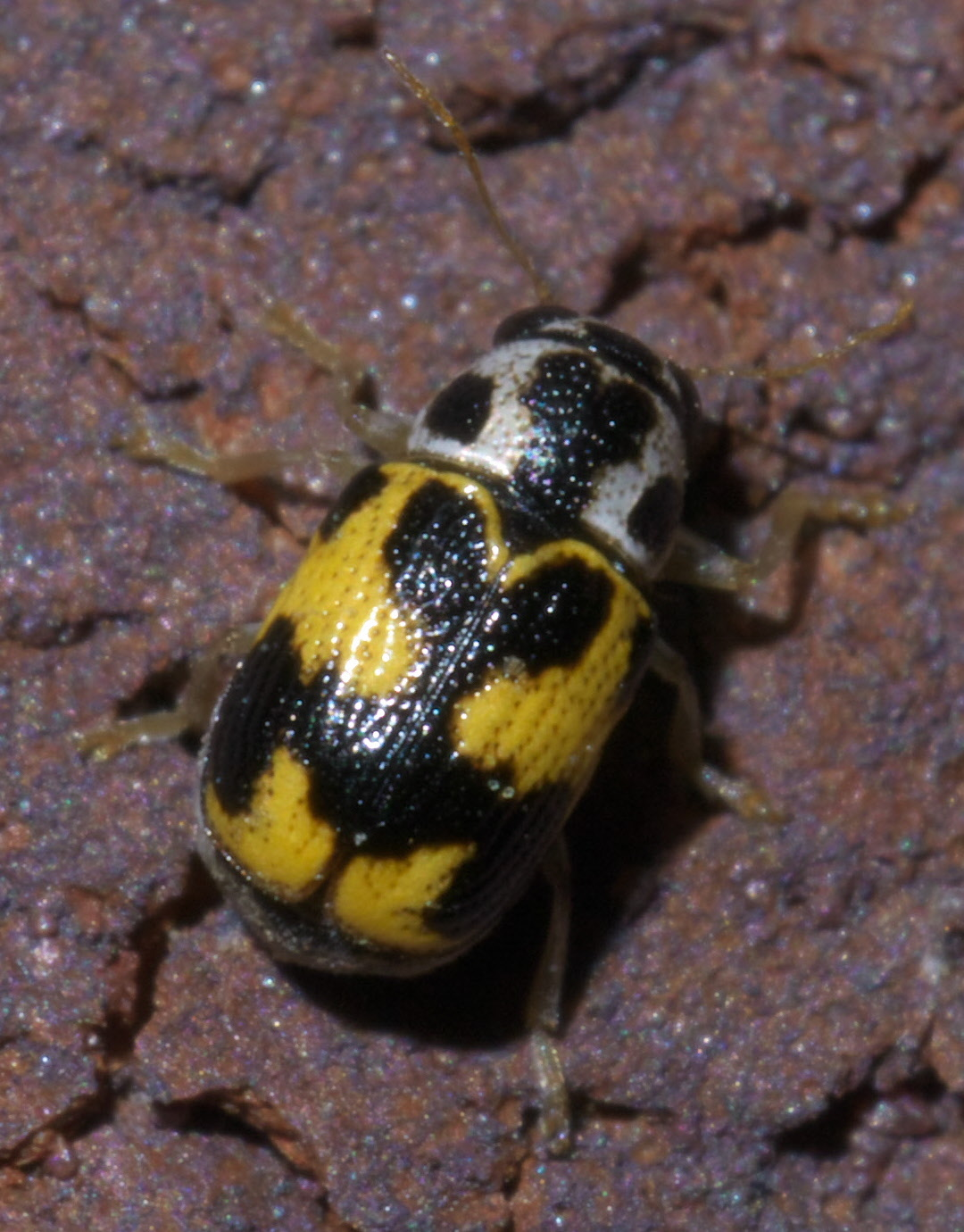
Pachybrachis tridens

== See also ==
- List of Pachybrachis species
