= Exema canadensis =

Scientific classification
- Kingdom: Animalia
- Phylum: Arthropoda
- Clade: Pancrustacea
- Class: Insecta
- Order: Coleoptera
- Suborder: Polyphaga
- Infraorder: Cucujiformia
- Family: Chrysomelidae
- Genus: Exema
- Species: E. canadensis

Binomial name
- Exema canadensis Pierce, 1940

Species of beetle

Exema canadensis is a species of warty leaf beetle in the family Chrysomelidae. It is found in North America.
