= Exema gibber =

Scientific classification
- Kingdom: Animalia
- Phylum: Arthropoda
- Clade: Pancrustacea
- Class: Insecta
- Order: Coleoptera
- Suborder: Polyphaga
- Infraorder: Cucujiformia
- Family: Chrysomelidae
- Genus: Exema
- Species: E. gibber

Binomial name
- Exema gibber (Fabricius, 1798)

Species of beetle

Exema gibber is a species of warty leaf beetle in the family Chrysomelidae. It is found in North America.
