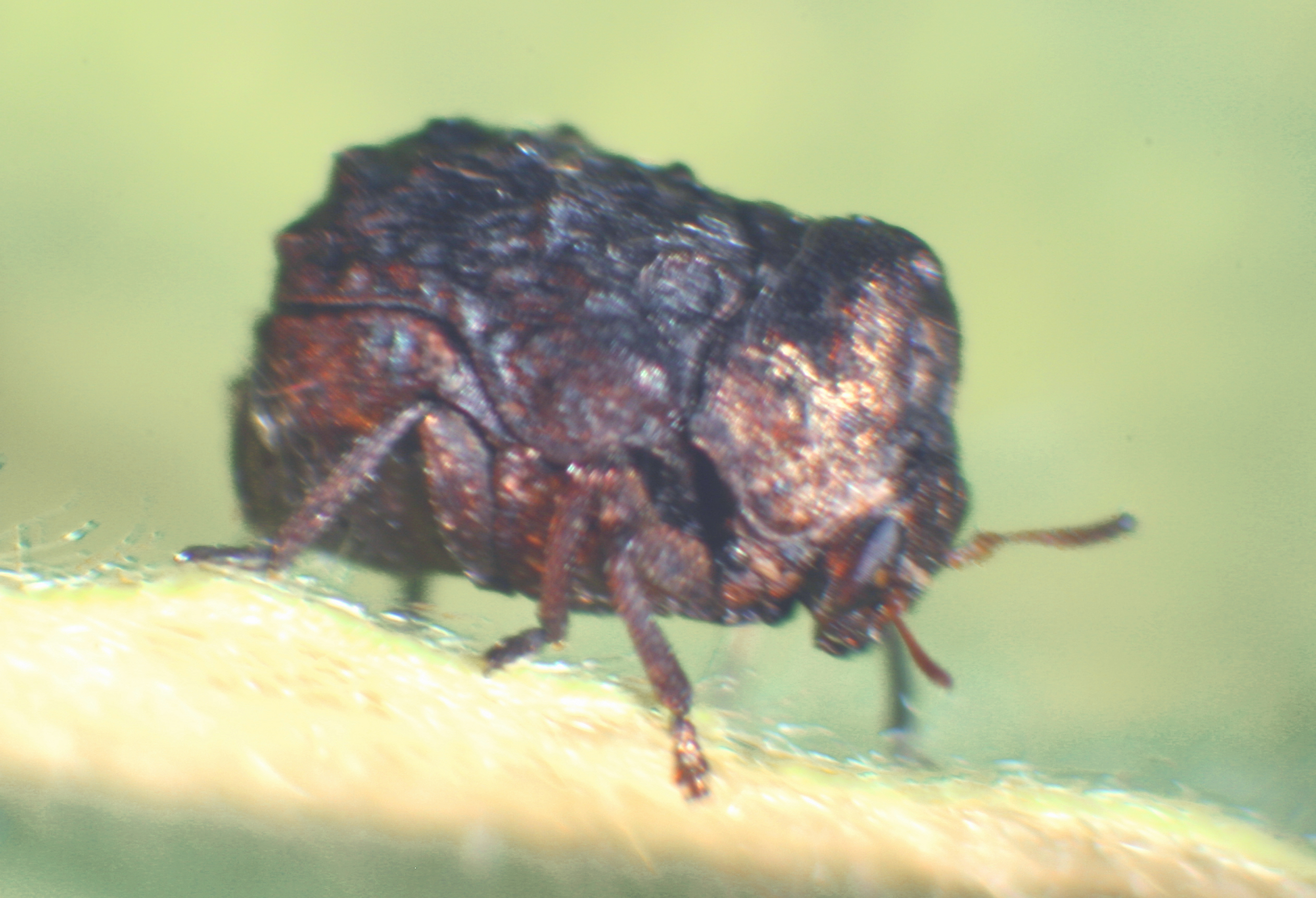
- Adult Neochlamisus bebbianae on the host plant Salix bebbiana

Scientific classification
- Kingdom: Animalia
- Phylum: Arthropoda
- Clade: Pancrustacea
- Class: Insecta
- Order: Coleoptera
- Suborder: Polyphaga
- Infraorder: Cucujiformia
- Family: Chrysomelidae
- Tribe: Fulcidacini
- Genus: Neochlamisus; Karren, 1972

Species
- 17–18, see text

Synonyms
- Arthrochlamys Ihering, 1904; Chlamys Knoch, 1801 (non Röding, 1798: preoccupied)

= Neochlamisus =

Genus of beetles

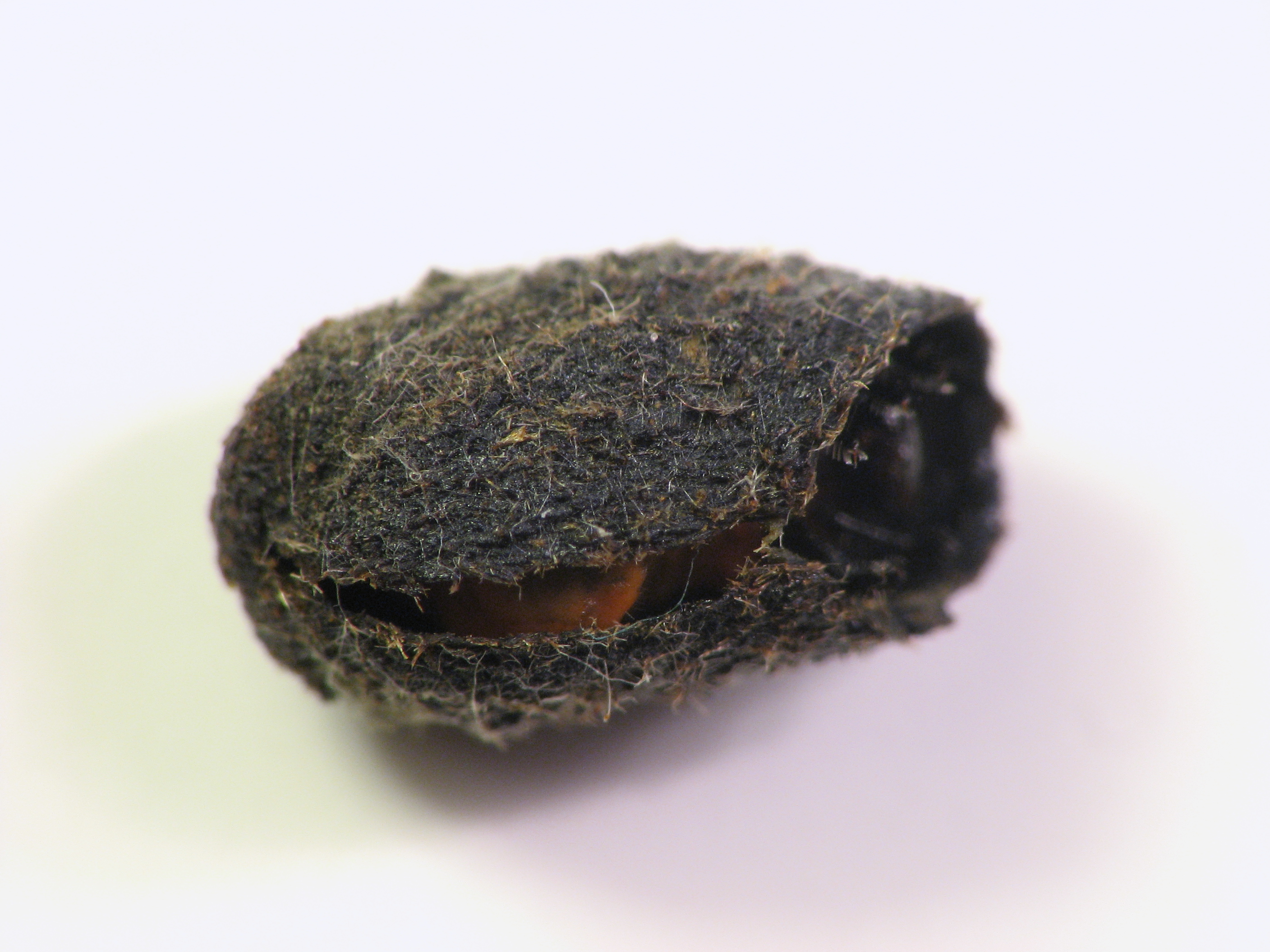
Larval fecal case

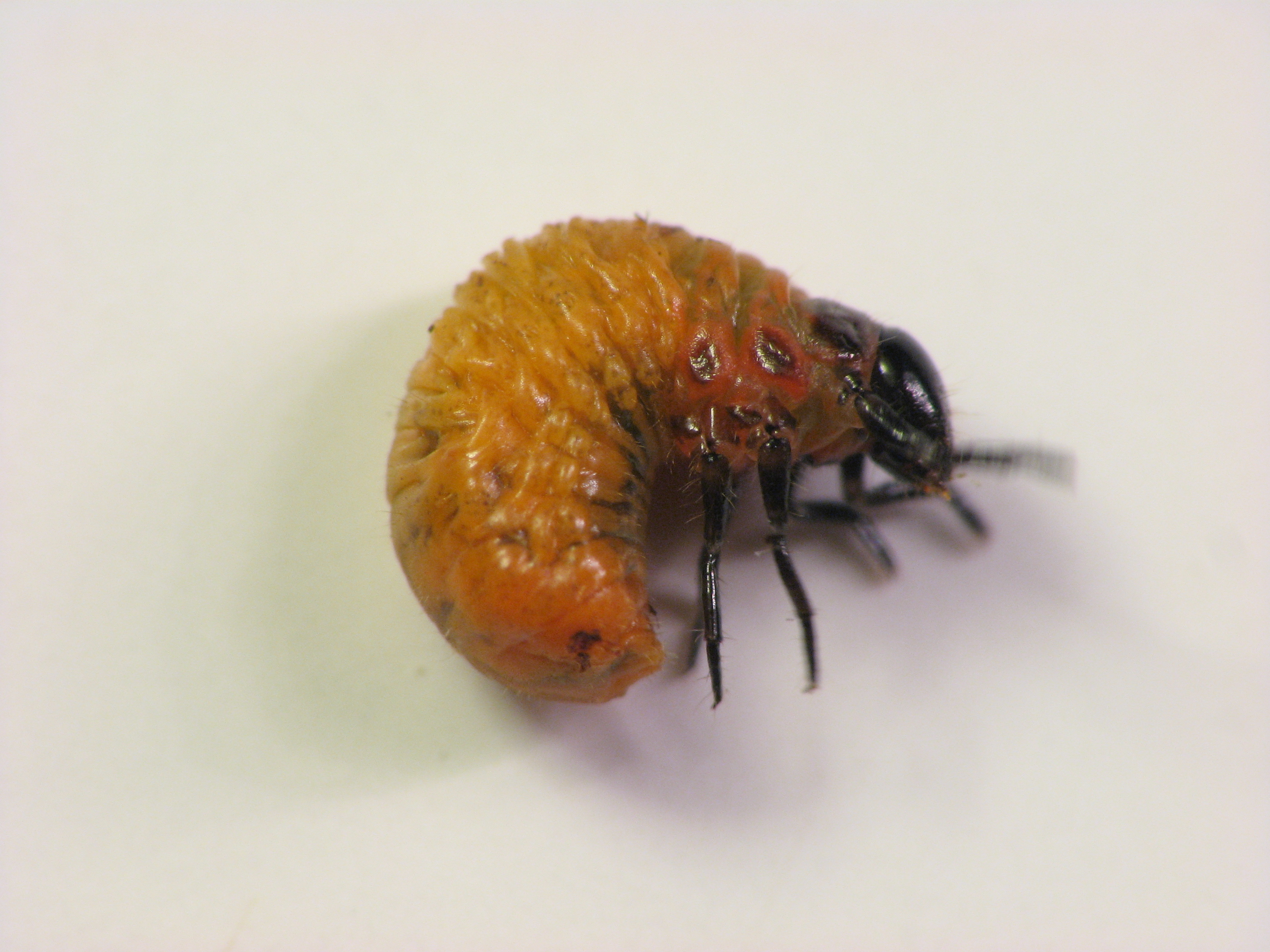
Larva removed from its fecal case

Neochlamisus is a genus of leaf beetles in the tribe Fulcidacini (the warty leaf beetles). They are members of the case-bearing leaf beetle group, the Camptosomata. Measuring 3–4 millimeters in length as adults, they are cryptic, superficially resembling caterpillar frass. Seventeen, sometimes 18 species are presently accepted in this genus, all of them occurring in North America (including Mexico; some were previously in the genus Chlamisus).

== Life history ==
In the spring, female Neochlamisus lay eggs singly on the leaves or stems of their host plant and then form a case of fecal material around each. The larvae remain on the natal host plant and add to and enlarge their fecal cases as they grow. Case enlargement in Neochlamisus is an elaborate process that larvae perform regularly until the case is sealed to the substrate prior to pupation. During this stage of the life cycle, beetles are immobile and are particularly vulnerable to predation. After about twenty days the newly hardened adult cuts a clean circle around the apex of the case, lifts this cap, and flies off to feed and mate. Neochlamisus adults feed and mate on the larval host plant species.

Neochlamisus species are typically very host-plant-specific and most species primarily use but a single host plant genus or even a single species. A rather well-known exception is N. bebbianae which feeds on particular species from six tree genera representing five different plant families. N. bebbianae populations associated with each of these plants are referred to as separate "host forms" and are the subject of ongoing studies of host-associated speciation.

== Species ==
Seventeen species are widely recognised:

- Neochlamisus alni (Brown, 1943)
- Neochlamisus assimilis (Klug, 1824)
- Neochlamisus bebbianae (Brown, 1943)
- Neochlamisus bimaculatus Karren, 1972
- Neochlamisus chamaedaphnes (Brown, 1943)
- Neochlamisus comptoniae (Brown, 1943)
- Neochlamisus cribripennis (J. L. LeConte, 1878)
- Neochlamisus eubati (Brown, 1952)
- Neochlamisus fragariae (Brown, 1952)
- Neochlamisus gibbosus (Fabricius, 1777)
- Neochlamisus insularis (Schaeffer, 1926)
- Neochlamisus moestificus (Lacordaire, 1848)
- Neochlamisus platani (Brown, 1952)
- Neochlamisus scabripennis (Schaeffer, 1926)
- Neochlamisus subelatus (Schaeffer, 1926)
- Neochlamisus tuberculatus (Klug, 1824)
- Neochlamisus velutinus Karren, 1972
