= Neochlamisus gibbosus =

Scientific classification
- Kingdom: Animalia
- Phylum: Arthropoda
- Clade: Pancrustacea
- Class: Insecta
- Order: Coleoptera
- Suborder: Polyphaga
- Infraorder: Cucujiformia
- Family: Chrysomelidae
- Genus: Neochlamisus
- Species: N. gibbosus

Binomial name
- Neochlamisus gibbosus (Fabricius, 1777)

Species of beetle

Neochlamisus gibbosus is a species of warty leaf beetle in the family Chrysomelidae. It is found in Central America and North America. Biology and morphology of all life stages of this species have been described from field study of live populations on Rubus laudatus Berger (Rosaceae) in Kansas. They lay one egg at a time. Females will cover the egg in frass, making a bell-shaped covering for the egg. Larvae will also create cases to attach their body to the host plant when molting. When threatened, they will release a yellow liquid.
