= Neochlamisus eubati =

Scientific classification
- Kingdom: Animalia
- Phylum: Arthropoda
- Clade: Pancrustacea
- Class: Insecta
- Order: Coleoptera
- Suborder: Polyphaga
- Infraorder: Cucujiformia
- Family: Chrysomelidae
- Genus: Neochlamisus
- Species: N. eubati

Binomial name
- Neochlamisus eubati (Brown, 1952)

Species of beetle

Neochlamisus eubati is a species of warty leaf beetle in the family Chrysomelidae. It is found in Central America and North America.
