= Neochlamisus velutinus =

Scientific classification
- Kingdom: Animalia
- Phylum: Arthropoda
- Clade: Pancrustacea
- Class: Insecta
- Order: Coleoptera
- Suborder: Polyphaga
- Infraorder: Cucujiformia
- Family: Chrysomelidae
- Genus: Neochlamisus
- Species: N. velutinus

Binomial name
- Neochlamisus velutinus Karren, 1972

Species of beetle

Neochlamisus velutinus is a species of warty leaf beetle in the family Chrysomelidae. It is found in Central America and North America.
