= Pseudochlamys =

Scientific classification
- Kingdom: Animalia
- Phylum: Arthropoda
- Clade: Pancrustacea
- Class: Insecta
- Order: Coleoptera
- Suborder: Polyphaga
- Infraorder: Cucujiformia
- Family: Chrysomelidae
- Subfamily: Cryptocephalinae
- Tribe: Fulcidacini
- Genus: Pseudochlamys; Lacordaire, 1848

Genus of beetles

Pseudochlamys is a genus of warty leaf beetles in the family Chrysomelidae. There is at least one described species in Pseudochlamys, P. semirufescens.
