= Neochlamisus comptoniae =

Scientific classification
- Kingdom: Animalia
- Phylum: Arthropoda
- Clade: Pancrustacea
- Class: Insecta
- Order: Coleoptera
- Suborder: Polyphaga
- Infraorder: Cucujiformia
- Family: Chrysomelidae
- Genus: Neochlamisus
- Species: N. comptoniae

Binomial name
- Neochlamisus comptoniae (Brown, 1943)

Species of beetle

Neochlamisus comptoniae is a species of warty leaf beetle in the family Chrysomelidae. It is found in North America.
