= Chlamisus texanus =

Scientific classification
- Kingdom: Animalia
- Phylum: Arthropoda
- Clade: Pancrustacea
- Class: Insecta
- Order: Coleoptera
- Suborder: Polyphaga
- Infraorder: Cucujiformia
- Family: Chrysomelidae
- Genus: Chlamisus
- Species: C. texanus

Binomial name
- Chlamisus texanus (Schaeffer, 1906)

Species of beetle

Chlamisus texanus is a species of warty leaf beetle in the family Chrysomelidae. It is found in Central America and North America.
