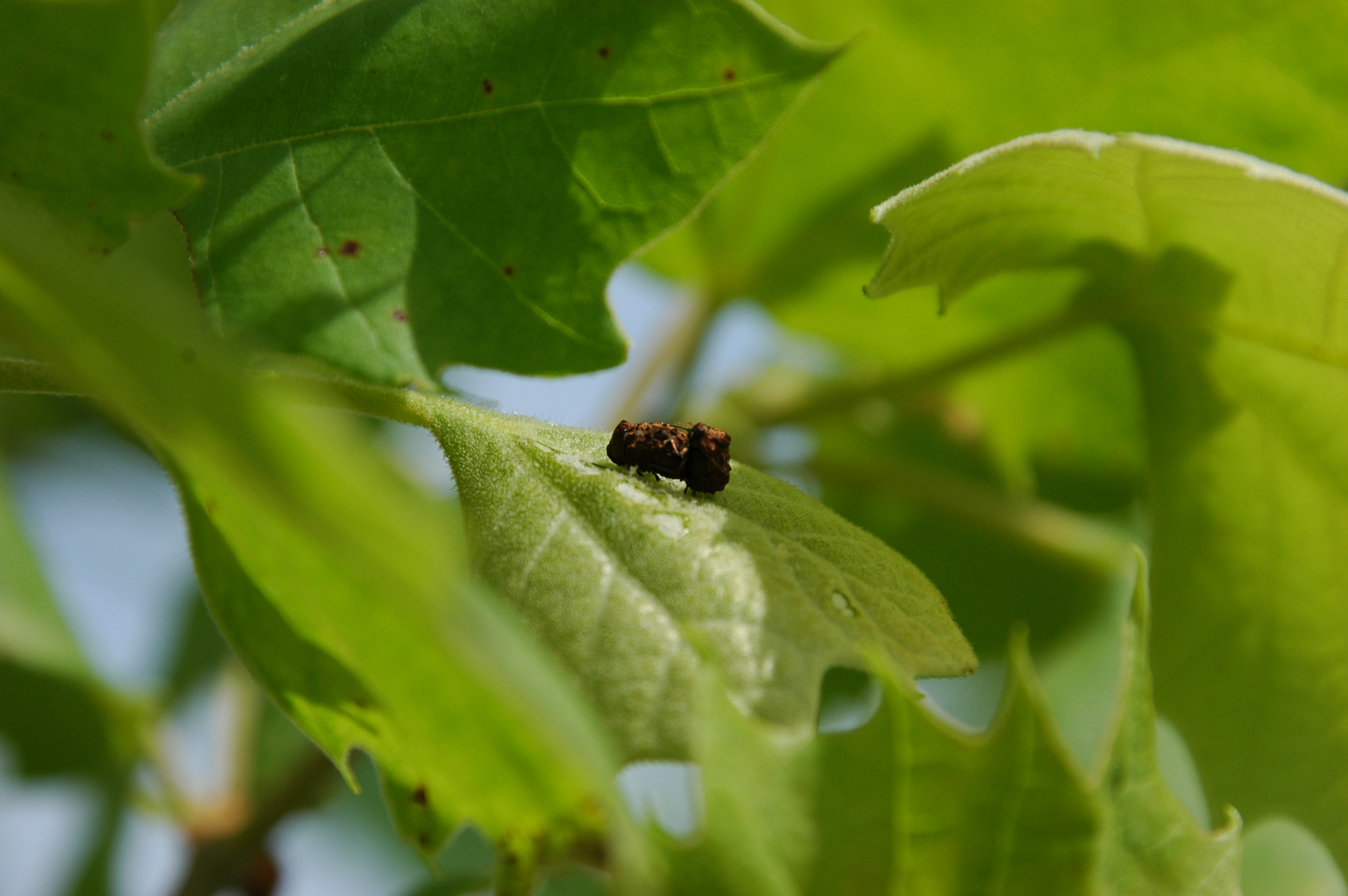
- Adults mating on the host plant Platanus occidentalis

Scientific classification
- Kingdom: Animalia
- Phylum: Arthropoda
- Clade: Pancrustacea
- Class: Insecta
- Order: Coleoptera
- Suborder: Polyphaga
- Infraorder: Cucujiformia
- Family: Chrysomelidae
- Genus: Neochlamisus
- Species: N. platani

Binomial name
- Neochlamisus platani (Brown, 1952)

= Neochlamisus platani =

Species of beetle

Neochlamisus platani is a species in the leaf beetle genus Neochlamisus. This beetle feeds, mates, and oviposits on their host plant American sycamore (Platanus occidentalis), where it prefers young trees. Its common name is the sycamore leaf beetle for this reason.

The adult beetle is bronze to brown in color and about 3.5 to 4 millimeters in length. Its exoskeleton is rough and bumpy, helping it to camouflage as a piece of bark or droppings. Both adults and larvae feed upon the foliage of the sycamore. Heavy infestations can begin to reduce the foliage mass of a tree, damaging its aesthetic value as an ornamental.
