= Neochlamisus bimaculatus =

Scientific classification
- Kingdom: Animalia
- Phylum: Arthropoda
- Clade: Pancrustacea
- Class: Insecta
- Order: Coleoptera
- Suborder: Polyphaga
- Infraorder: Cucujiformia
- Family: Chrysomelidae
- Genus: Neochlamisus
- Species: N. bimaculatus

Binomial name
- Neochlamisus bimaculatus Karren, 1972

Species of beetle

Neochlamisus bimaculatus is a small leaf beetle (Coleoptera: Chrysomelidae) that belongs to the group of casebearers called Camptosomata. They mate, feed, and oviposit on their host plant Rubus spp., which includes blackberry.
