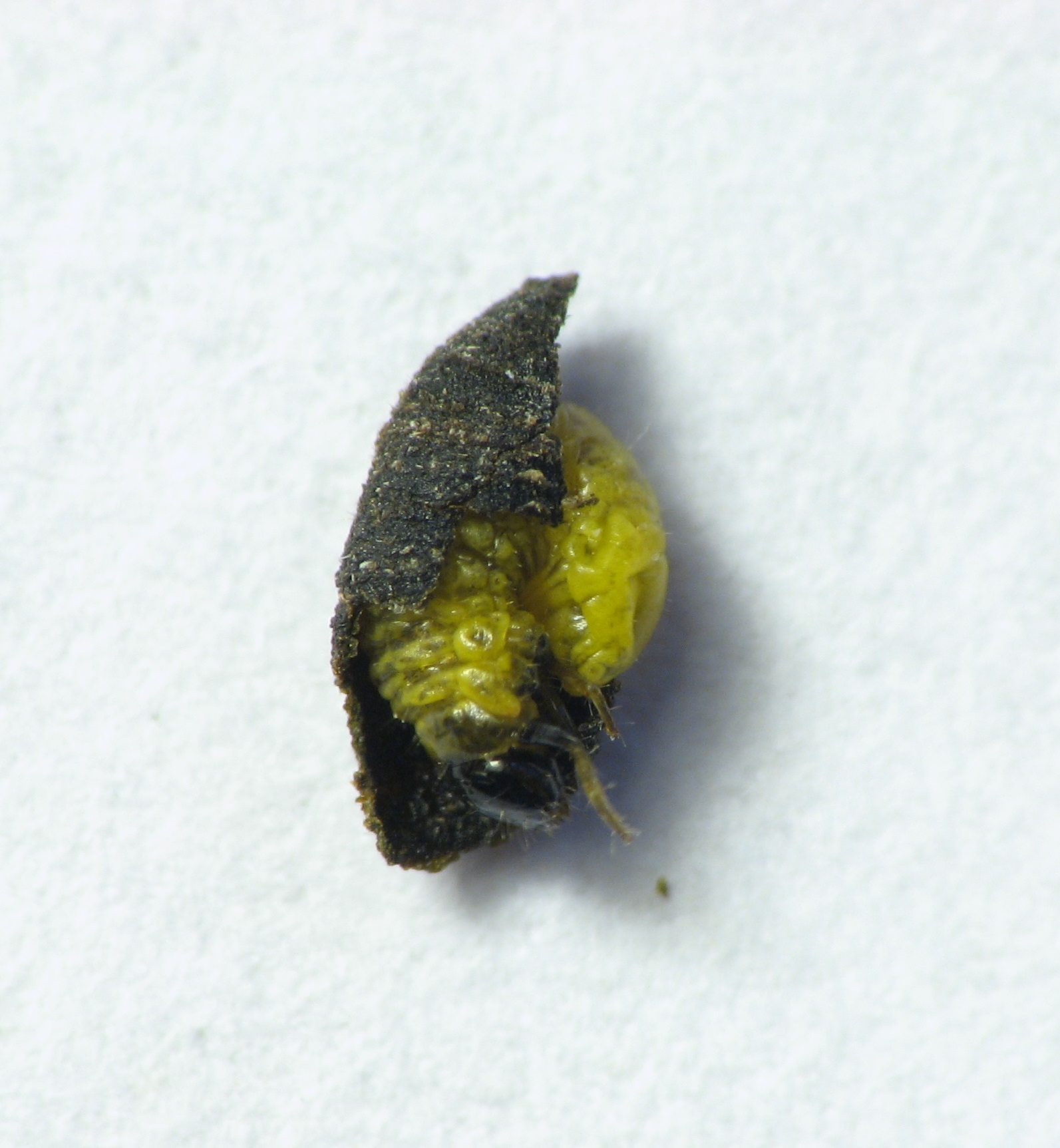
- Larva inside its fecal case

Scientific classification
- Kingdom: Animalia
- Phylum: Arthropoda
- Clade: Pancrustacea
- Class: Insecta
- Order: Coleoptera
- Suborder: Polyphaga
- Infraorder: Cucujiformia
- Family: Chrysomelidae
- Subfamily: Cryptocephalinae
- Tribe: Fulcidacini
- Genus: Exema; Lacordaire, 1848

Species
- Several, see text

= Exema =

Genus of beetles

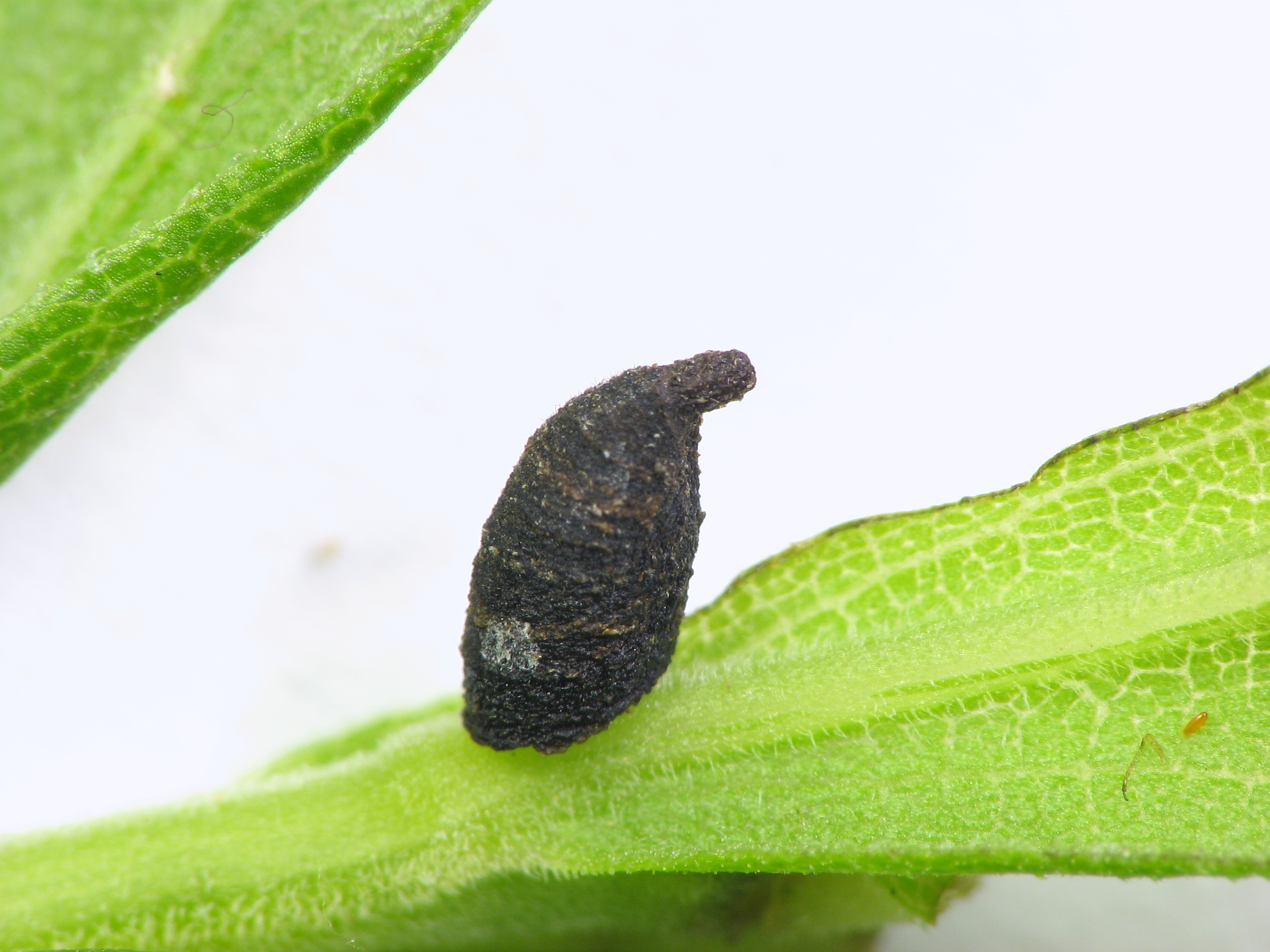
Larval fecal case of Exema sp.

Exema is a genus of leaf beetles in the tribe Fulcidacini. They occur worldwide, with 9 species in North America for example.

== Selected species ==
- Exema byersi Karren, 1966
- Exema canadensis Pierce, 1940
- Exema chiricahuana Pierce, 1941
- Exema conspersa Mannerheim, 1843
- Exema deserti Pierce, 1940
- Exema dispar Lacordaire, 1848
- Exema elliptica Karren, 1966
- Exema gibber Fabricius, 1798
- Exema globensis Pierce, 1940
- Exema inyoensis Pierce, 1940
- Exema jenksi Pierce, 1940
- Exema mormona Karren, 1966
- Exema neglecta Blatchley, 1920
- Exema parvisaxi Pierce 1940
