= Chlamisus foveolatus =

Scientific classification
- Kingdom: Animalia
- Phylum: Arthropoda
- Clade: Pancrustacea
- Class: Insecta
- Order: Coleoptera
- Suborder: Polyphaga
- Infraorder: Cucujiformia
- Family: Chrysomelidae
- Genus: Chlamisus
- Species: C. foveolatus

Binomial name
- Chlamisus foveolatus (Knoch, 1801)

Species of beetle

Chlamisus foveolatus is a species of warty leaf beetle in the family Chrysomelidae. It is found in Central America and North America.
