= Diplacaspis =

Scientific classification
- Kingdom: Animalia
- Phylum: Arthropoda
- Clade: Pancrustacea
- Class: Insecta
- Order: Coleoptera
- Suborder: Polyphaga
- Infraorder: Cucujiformia
- Family: Chrysomelidae
- Subfamily: Cryptocephalinae
- Tribe: Fulcidacini
- Genus: Diplacaspis; Jacobson, 1924

Genus of beetles

Diplacaspis is a genus of warty leaf beetles in the family Chrysomelidae. There are at least three described species in Diplacaspis.

== Species ==
These three species belong to the genus Diplacaspis:

- Diplacaspis chlamysoides Monros
- Diplacaspis pectoralis Monros
- Diplacaspis prosternalis (Schaeffer, 1906)
