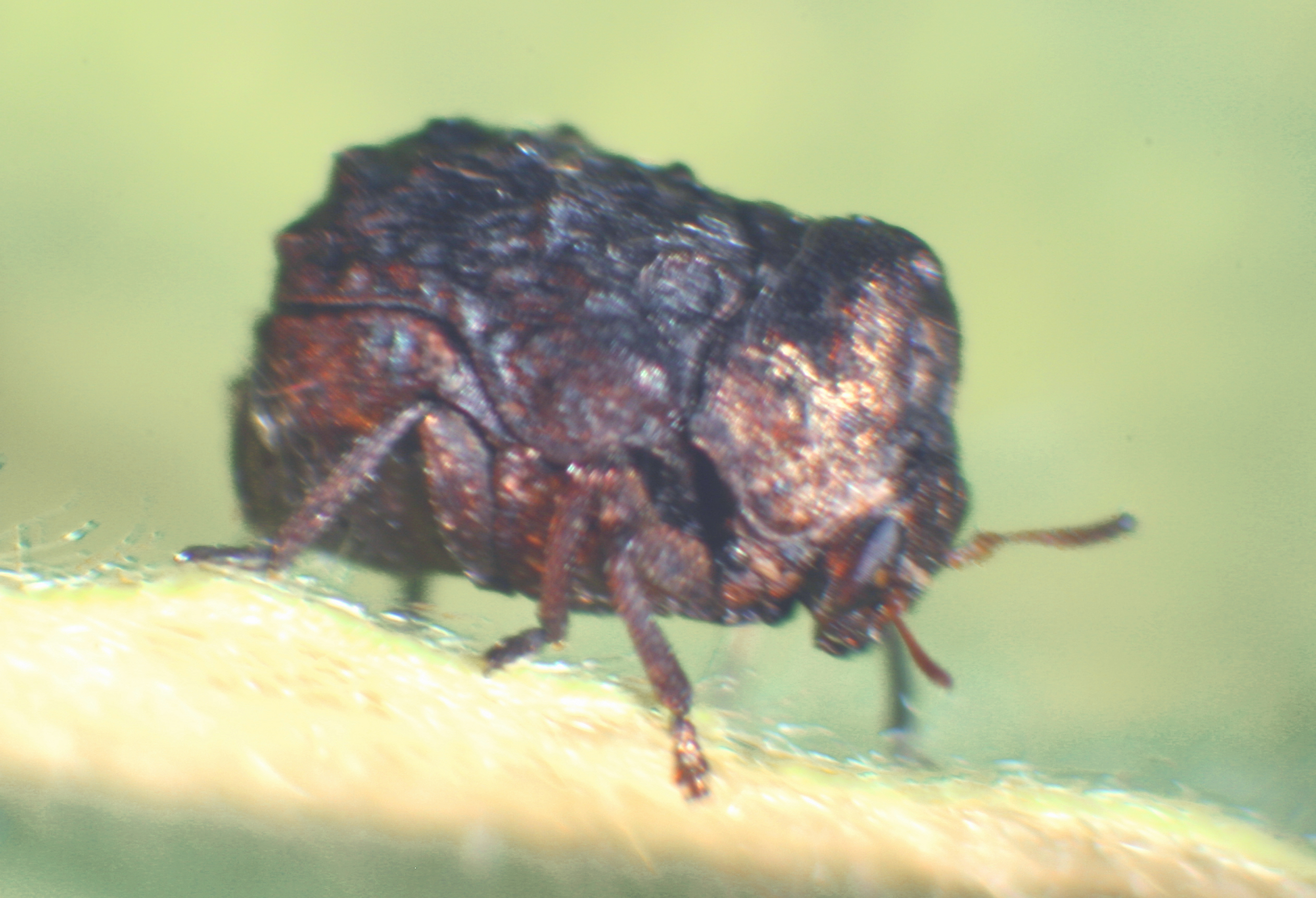
- N. bebbianae adult on its host plant Salix bebbiana

Scientific classification
- Kingdom: Animalia
- Phylum: Arthropoda
- Clade: Pancrustacea
- Class: Insecta
- Order: Coleoptera
- Suborder: Polyphaga
- Infraorder: Cucujiformia
- Family: Chrysomelidae
- Genus: Neochlamisus
- Species: N. bebbianae

Binomial name
- Neochlamisus bebbianae (Brown, 1943)

= Neochlamisus bebbianae =

Species of beetle

Neochlamisus bebbianae is a species in the leaf beetle genus Neochlamisus.
