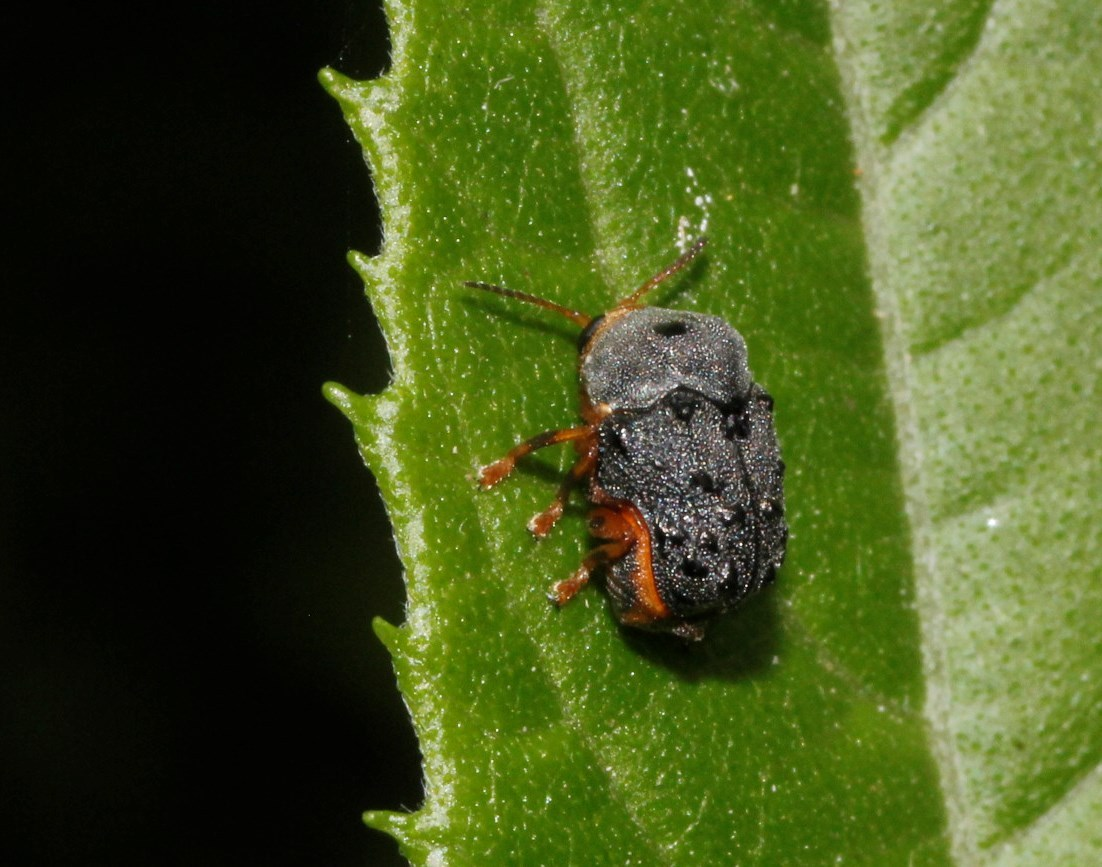
- Chlamisus maculipes, México

Scientific classification
- Kingdom: Animalia
- Phylum: Arthropoda
- Clade: Pancrustacea
- Class: Insecta
- Order: Coleoptera
- Suborder: Polyphaga
- Infraorder: Cucujiformia
- Family: Chrysomelidae
- Subfamily: Cryptocephalinae
- Tribe: Fulcidacini
- Genus: Chlamisus; Rafinesque, 1815

= Chlamisus =

Genus of beetles

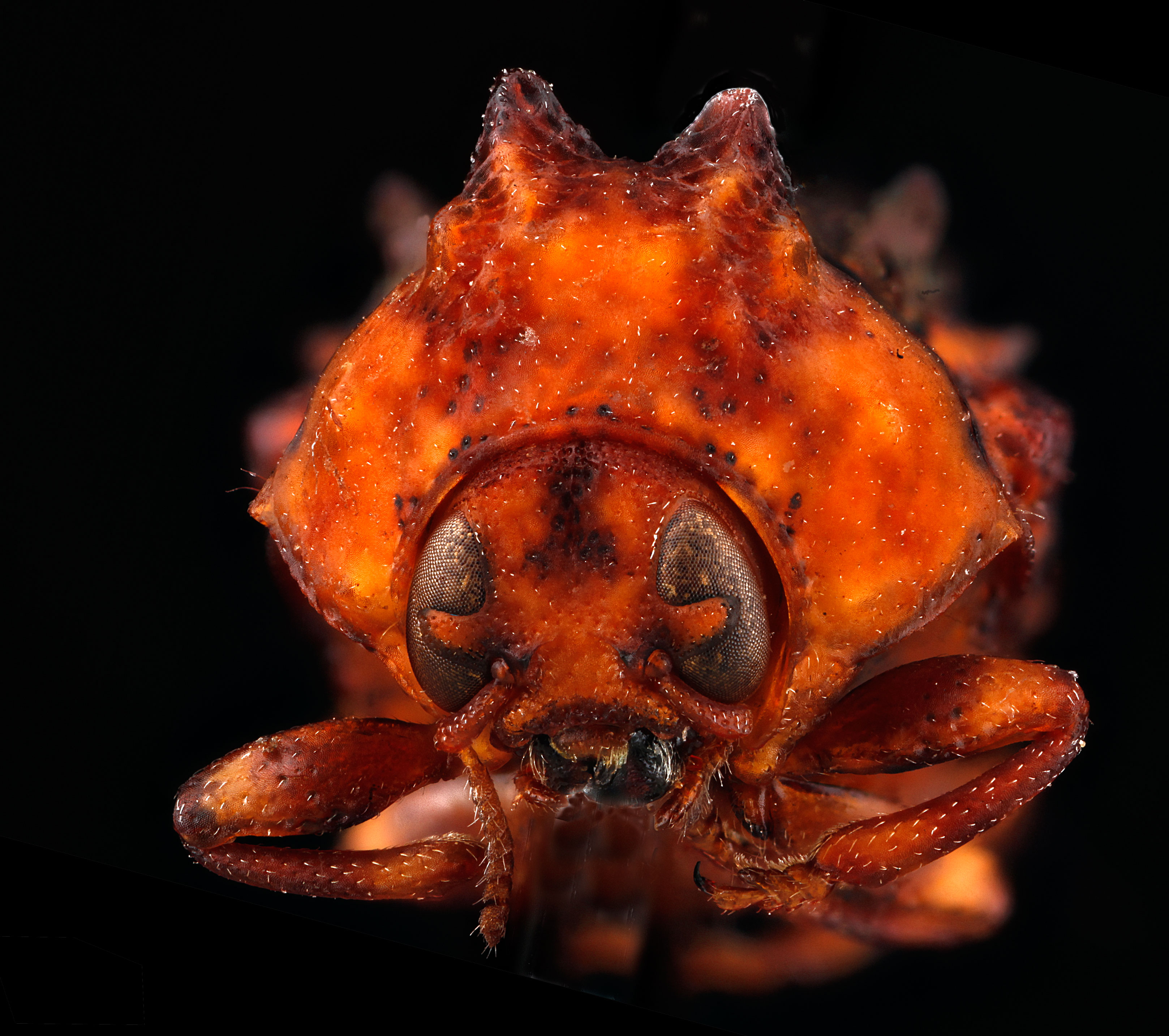
Chlamisus

Chlamisus, sometimes known as the cloaked warty leaf beetles, is a genus of warty leaf beetles in the family Chrysomelidae. There are more than 100 described species in Chlamisus.

== Species ==
As of 2026, GBIF lists the following 107 species of Chlamisus:

- Chlamisus aesopus Lacordaire, 1848
- Chlamisus angularis (Gressitt, 1942) Gressitt, 1942
- Chlamisus angulisternus (Chujo, 1940)
- Chlamisus arizonensis (Linell, 1898)
- Chlamisus bicornis (Lacordaire, 1848)
- Chlamisus bryanti Monrós, 1953
- Chlamisus capitatus (Bowditch, 1913)
- Chlamisus castaneus (Chen, 1940) Chen, 1940
- Chlamisus cheni (Gressitt, 1942) Gressitt, 1942
- Chlamisus chevrolati Fauvel, 1860
- Chlamisus chinensis (Baly, 1878) Baly, 1878
- Chlamisus chrysocephala Klug, 1824
- Chlamisus chujoi (Gressitt, 1940)
- Chlamisus cinerea (Lacordaire, 1848)
- Chlamisus clermonti (Achard, 1919) Achard, 1919
- Chlamisus corinthia (Lacordaire, 1848)
- Chlamisus corollinotatus
- Chlamisus cyanophtalma Lacordaire, 1848
- Chlamisus diminutus (Gressitt, 1942)
- Chlamisus ferregineus Gressitt, 1946
- Chlamisus ferrugineus Gressitt, 1946
- Chlamisus flavidus Karren, 1972
- Chlamisus flavomaculatus Tan & Zhou, 1995
- Chlamisus flavosignatus (Chujo, 1940)
- Chlamisus formosanus (Bates, 1866)
- Chlamisus foveolatus (Knoch, 1801)
- Chlamisus fulvitarsis (Achard, 1919) Achard, 1919
- Chlamisus geniculatus (Lacordaire, 1848)
- Chlamisus gibbicollis Gressitt & Kimoto, 1961
- Chlamisus goldenae Gressitt & Kimoto, 1961
- Chlamisus huachucae (Schaeffer, 1906)
- Chlamisus hypocrita (Lacordaire, 1848)
- Chlamisus ibomune (Chujo, 1940)
- Chlamisus japonicus (Jacoby, 1885)
- Chlamisus kermes Lacordaire, 1848
- Chlamisus labyrinthica Lacordaire, 1848
- Chlamisus lamprosomoides Lacordaire, 1848
- Chlamisus leonina Lacordaire, 1848
- Chlamisus lima (Lacordaire, 1848)
- Chlamisus lycocephalus
- Chlamisus maculiceps (Gressitt, 1942) Gressitt, 1942
- Chlamisus maculipes (Chevrolat, 1835)
- Chlamisus martialis (Gressitt, 1942) Gressitt, 1942
- Chlamisus mastocera Lacordaire, 1848
- Chlamisus melancholica (Lacordaire, 1848)
- Chlamisus metasequoiae Gressitt & Kimoto, 1961
- Chlamisus montanus (Gressitt, 1942) Gressitt, 1942
- Chlamisus monticolus (Chujo, 1940)
- Chlamisus mosaicus Tan, 1992
- Chlamisus munemizo (Chujo, 1940)
- Chlamisus nanshanchiensis Kimoto, 1969
- Chlamisus nattereri Kollar, 1824
- Chlamisus nigripes (Chujo, 1940)
- Chlamisus nigromaculatus Karren, 1972
- Chlamisus nodicollis Lacordaire, 1848
- Chlamisus onerata (Lacordaire, 1848)
- Chlamisus pallidiceps Gressitt, 1946
- Chlamisus pallidicornis (Gressitt, 1942) Gressitt, 1942
- Chlamisus palliditarsis (Chen, 1940) Chen, 1940
- Chlamisus pedata (Lacordaire, 1848)
- Chlamisus piceifrons (Gressitt, 1942) Gressitt, 1942
- Chlamisus pilifrons (Lefèvre, 1883) Lefevre, 1883
- Chlamisus pipa Lacordaire, 1848
- Chlamisus prominens Gressitt, 1946
- Chlamisus pubiceps (Chûjô, 1940) Chujo, 1940
- Chlamisus punctigera (Lacordaire, 1848)
- Chlamisus purpureocupreus Chen, 1976
- Chlamisus quadrilobatus (Schaeffer, 1926)
- Chlamisus reticulicollis (Gressitt, 1942) Gressitt, 1942
- Chlamisus rimosa Lacordaire, 1848
- Chlamisus ringens (Lacordaire, 1848)
- Chlamisus rivularis Lacordaire, 1848
- Chlamisus robustus (Chujo, 1940)
- Chlamisus rudis (Lacordaire, 1848)
- Chlamisus rufescens Gressitt, 1946
- Chlamisus ruficeps (Chen, 1940) Chen, 1940
- Chlamisus rufulus (Chen, 1940) Chen, 1940
- Chlamisus rugiceps (Chen, 1940) Chen, 1940
- Chlamisus rugosus Zhou & Tan, 1995
- Chlamisus rusticus (Gressitt, 1942) Gressitt, 1942
- Chlamisus scrobicollis (Lacordaire, 1848)
- Chlamisus sellata Klug, 1824
- Chlamisus semirufus (Chen, 1940) Chen, 1940
- Chlamisus setosus (Bowditch, 1913) Bowditch, 1913
- Chlamisus sexcarinatus (Gressitt, 1942) Gressitt, 1942
- Chlamisus shirozui M.Chujo, 1956
- Chlamisus speciosus Tan & Zhou, 1995
- Chlamisus spilotus (Baly, 1873) Baly, 1873
- Chlamisus stercoralis (Gressitt, 1942) Gressitt, 1942
- Chlamisus subferrugineus (Gressitt, 1942) Gressitt, 1942
- Chlamisus subruficeps Tan, 1992
- Chlamisus suisapanus Gressitt & Kimoto, 1961
- Chlamisus sungkangensis Kimoto, 1969
- Chlamisus superciliosus Gressitt, 1946
- Chlamisus surinamensis Jacoby, 1904
- Chlamisus texanus (Schaeffer, 1906)
- Chlamisus tuberculithorax (Gressitt, 1942) Gressitt, 1942
- Chlamisus uniformis Gressitt, 1946
- Chlamisus varipennatus
- Chlamisus velutinomaculatus Gressitt, 1946
- Chlamisus verrucosa (Lacordaire, 1848)
- Chlamisus vipera Lacordaire, 1848
- Chlamisus vulturina Lacordaire, 1848
- Chlamisus wuyiensis Zhou & Tan, 1995
- Chlamisus y-costatus (Chujo, 1940)
- Chlamisus yunnanus (Bowditch, 1913) Bowditch, 1913
- Chlamisus zhamensis Tan, 1981
