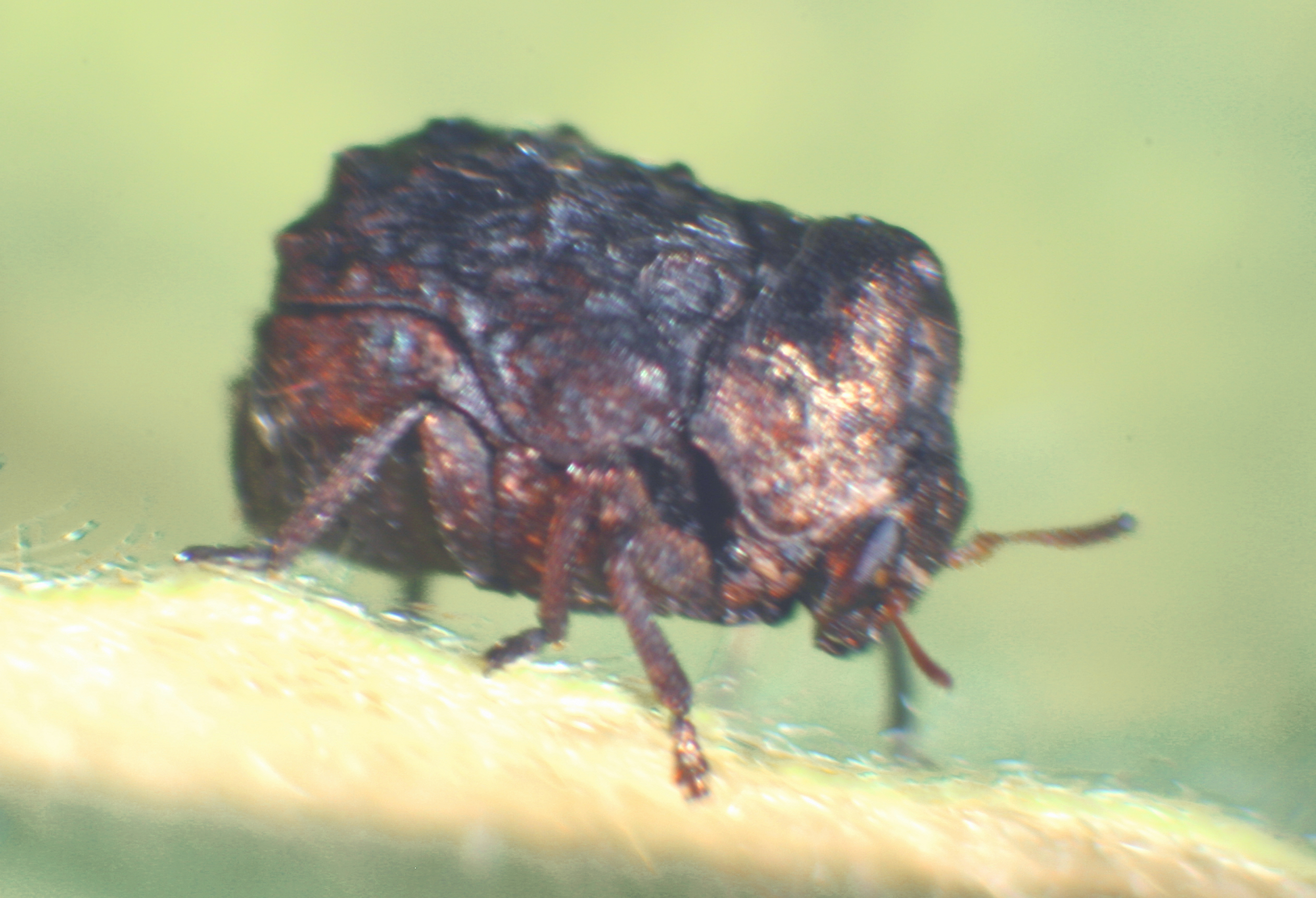
- Adult Neochlamisus bebbianae on the host plant Salix bebbiana

Scientific classification
- Kingdom: Animalia
- Phylum: Arthropoda
- Clade: Pancrustacea
- Class: Insecta
- Order: Coleoptera
- Suborder: Polyphaga
- Infraorder: Cucujiformia
- Family: Chrysomelidae
- Subfamily: Cryptocephalinae
- Tribe: Fulcidacini; Jacobson, 1924

Genera
- 11, see text

Synonyms
- Chlamisinae; Chlamisini Gressitt, 1946

= Fulcidacini =

Tribe of beetles

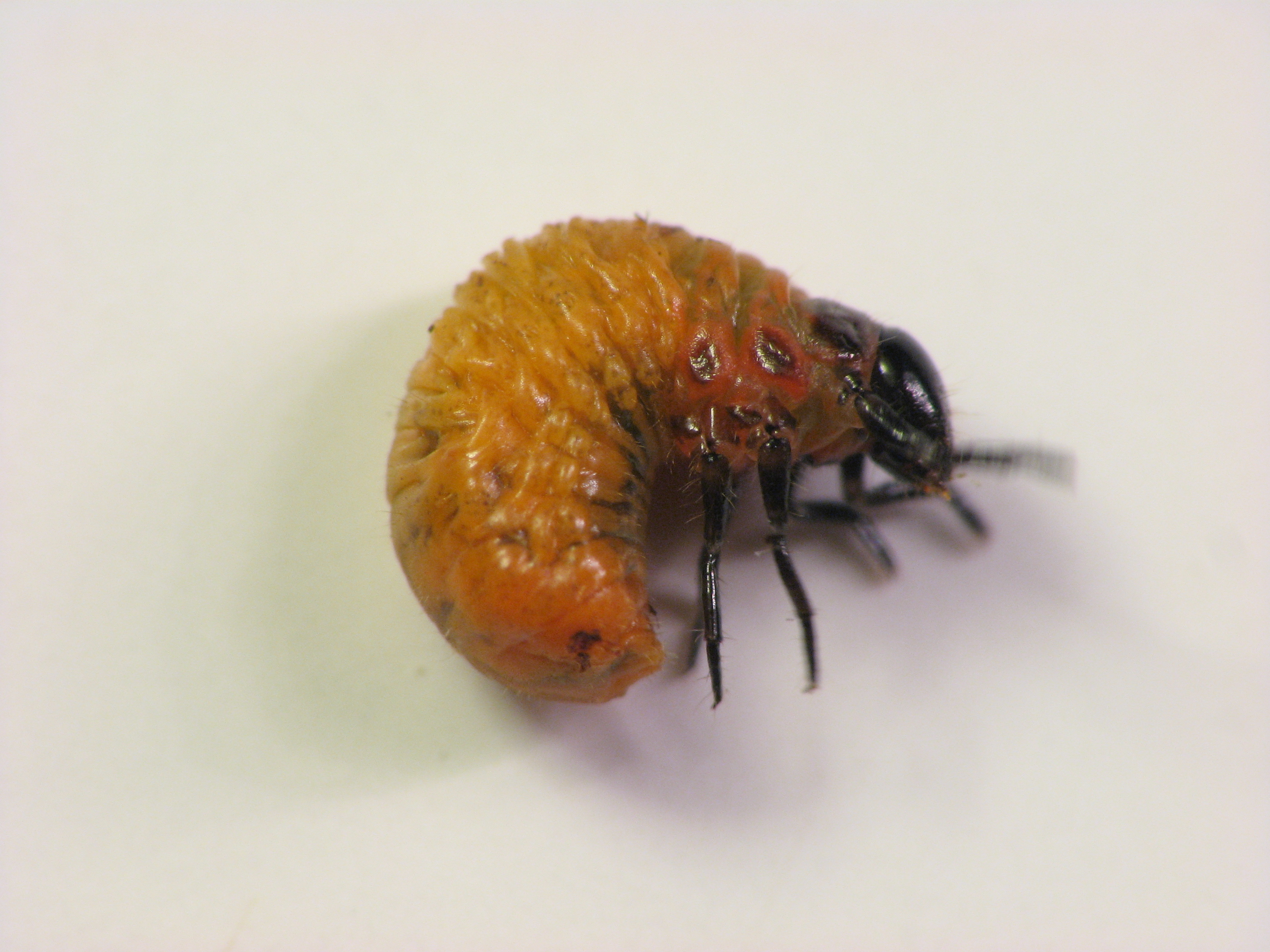
Neochlamisus sp. larva, removed from larval fecal case

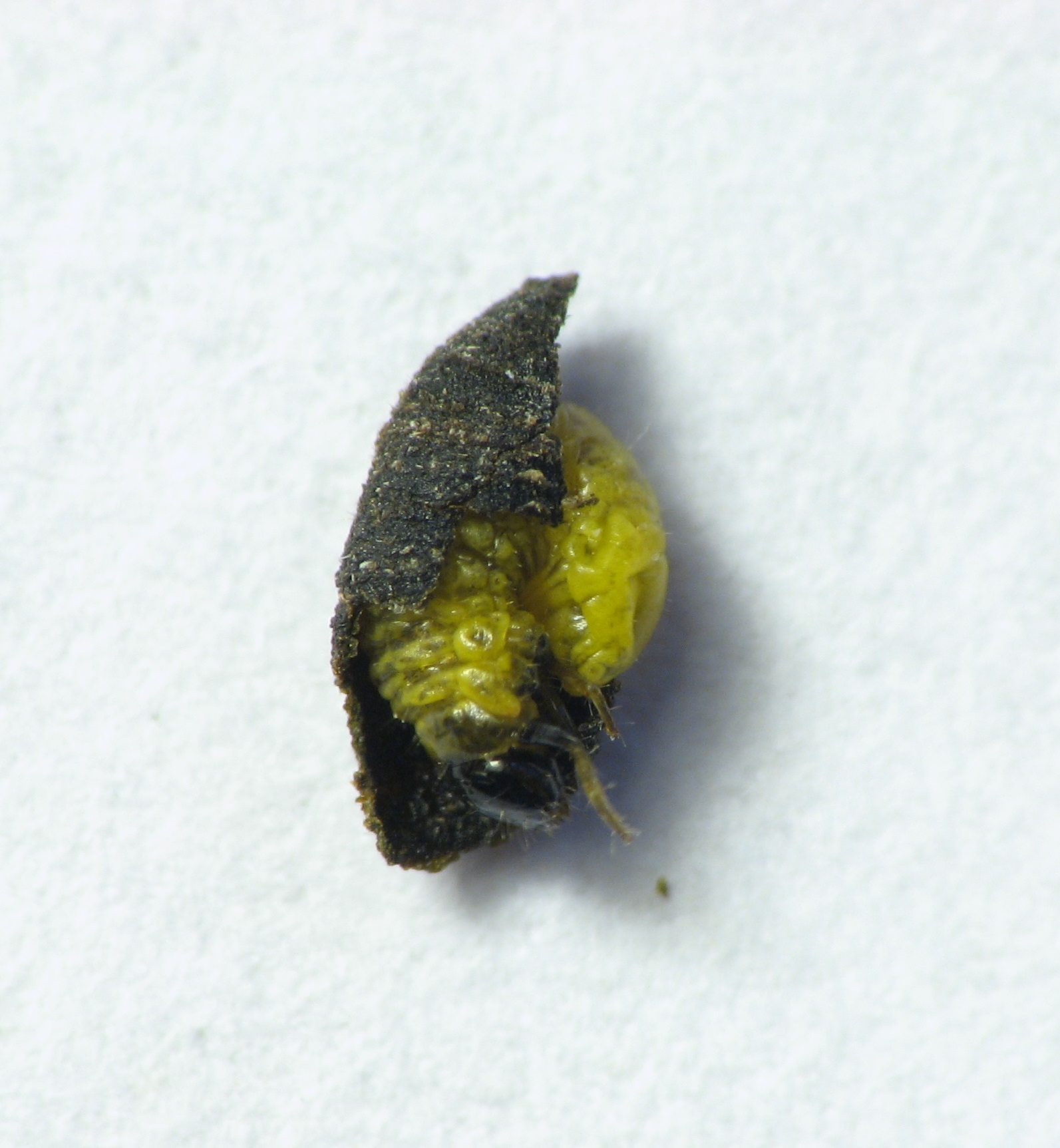
Exema sp. larva in fecal case

The Fulcidacini, sometimes known as the warty leaf beetles, are a tribe within the leaf beetle subfamily Cryptocephalinae, though historically they were often treated as a distinct subfamily, Chlamisinae. 11 genera with altogether about 400 species are currently placed here; some four-fifths of the species are found in the Neotropics, but the rest is distributed over all other continents except Antarctica.

== Genera and species ==
Genera and some selected species include:

- Chlamisus Rafinesque, 1815
  - Chlamisus amyemae Reid, 1991
  - Chlamisus arizonensis Linell, 1898
  - Chlamisus aterrimus Lea, 1904
  - Chlamisus flavidus Karren, 1972
  - Chlamisus foveolatus Knoch, 1801
  - Chlamisus huachucae Schaeffer, 1906
  - Chlamisus maculipes Chevrolat, 1835
  - Chlamisus mimosae Karren, 1989
  - Chlamisus minax Lacordaire
  - Chlamisus nigromaculatus Karren, 1972
  - Chlamisus quadrilobatus Schaeffer, 1926
  - Chlamisus texanus Schaeffer, 1906
- Diplacaspis Jacobson, 1924
  - Diplacaspis prosternalis Schaeffer, 1906
- Exema
- Melitochlamys Monrós, 1948
- Neochlamisus (c.17 species)
- Poropleura Lacordaire, 1848 (= Fulcidax Voet, 1806, an unavailable name)
  - Poropleura bacca (Kirby, 1818)
  - Poropleura coelestina Lacordaire, 1848
  - Poropleura cuprea (Klug, 1824)
  - Poropleura lisai (Uliana & Daccordi, 2022)
  - Poropleura monstrosa (Fabricius, 1798)
- Pseudochlamys Lacordaire, 1848
  - Pseudochlamys megalostomoides Lacordaire, 1849
  - Pseudochlamys semirufescens Karren, 1972
