= List of least concern plants =

- Extinct in the wild (EW): 46 species
- Critically endangered (CR): 6,445 species
- Endangered (EN): 12,707 species
- Vulnerable (VU): 10,596 species
- Near threatened (NT, LR/cd): 4,880 species
- Least concern (LC): 35,732 species
- Data deficient (DD): 6,317 species
Plant species (IUCN, 2025.2)
- 76,864 extant species have been evaluated
- 70,547 of those are fully assessed (Note: excludes data deficient evaluations.)
- 40,612 are not threatened at present
- 29,935 are threatened (Note: Threatened comprises CR, EN and VU.)
- 187 to 892 are extinct or extinct in the wild:
  - 141 extinct (EX) species (Note: Chart omits extinct (EX) species)
  - 46 extinct in the wild (EW)
  - 648 possibly extinct [CR(PE)]
  - 57 possibly extinct in the wild [CR(PEW)]

As of September 2016, the International Union for Conservation of Nature (IUCN) lists 6645 least concern plant species. 30% of all evaluated plant species are listed as least concern. The IUCN also lists 131 subspecies and 118 varieties as least concern. No subpopulations of plants have been evaluated by the IUCN.

This is a complete list of least concern plant species, subspecies and varieties evaluated by the IUCN.

== Algae ==
- Chara hydropitys
- Nitella flexilis, stonewort
- Nitella mucronata
- Nitella myriotricha
- Nitella oligospira
- Nitella pseudoflabellata
- Nitella tenuissima
- Nitella terrestris
- Ochtodes crokeri
- Pachymenia saxicola
- Pleonosporium complanatum
- Pugetia latiloba

== Bryophytes ==
There are 14 bryophyte species assessed as least concern.

=== Mosses ===
- Hymenostylium gracillimum
- Orthotrichum scanicum
- Wardia hygrometrica

=== Liverworts ===
- Cheilolejeunea cedercreutzii
- Cololejeunea azorica
- Frullania polysticta
- Herbertus borealis
- Lepidozia azorica
- Leptoscyphus azoricus
- Luteolejeunea herzogii
- Marsupella profunda
- Plagiochila fuscolutea
- Sauteria spongiosa
- Stenorrhipis rhizomatica

== Pteridophytes ==
There are 113 species, three subspecies, and one variety of pteridophyte assessed as least concern.

=== Leptosporangiate ferns ===
There are 78 species, three subspecies, and one variety in the class Polypodiopsida assessed as least concern.

==== Polypodiales ====
Species

- Acrostichum aureum, golden leather fern
- Acrostichum danaeifolium
- Acrostichum speciosum
- Adiantum capillus-veneris, maidenhair fern
- Aspidium ochthodes
- Asplenium aequibasis
- Asplenium formosum, showy spleenwort
- Athyrium medium
- Athyrium solenopteris
- Blotiella stipitata
- Bolbitis appendiculata
- Bolbitis presiliana
- Bolbitis semicordata
- Bolbitis subcrenata
- Ceratopteris cornuta
- Ceratopteris thalictroides
- Cyclosorus ciliatus
- Cyclosorus interruptus, Hottentot fern
- Didymochlaena truncatula
- Diplazium chimborazense
- Diplazium esculentum
- Diplazium filamentosum, black-scale fern
- Dryopteris corleyi, Costa Verde male-fern
- Elaphoglossum beddomei
- Elaphoglossum nilgiricum
- Elaphoglossum stelligerum
- Lellingeria rupestris
- Leptochilus decurrens
- Lindsaea kirkii
- Lorinseria areolata
- Microlepia trapeziformis
- Microsorum pteropus
- Nephrolepis exaltata
- Onoclea sensibilis
- Onoclea struthiopteris, ostrich fern
- Oreogrammitis pilifera
- Polypodium mindense
- Polypodium segregatum
- Polypodium tridens
- Pseudophegopteris dianae, brown-scale fern
- Pseudophegopteris pyrrhorachis
- Pteridium aquilinum
- Pteris barkleyae
- Pteris paleacea, lays-back fern
- Pteris usambarensis
- Pteris vittata, ladder brake
- Thelypteris palustris, marsh fern
- Thelypteris semilunata
- Thelypteris tetragona, freetip maiden fern
- Thelypteris xylodes
- Woodwardia virginica

Subspecies

- Pteris albersii subsp. mufindiensis
- Pteris albersii subsp. uaraguessensis
- Thelypteris tetragona subsp. aberrans

Varieties

- Asplenium formosum var. carolinum

==== Hymenophyllales ====
- Crepidomanes intramarginale
- Crepidomanes maximum
- Trichomanes angustatum
- Trichomanes speciosum, Killarney fern

==== Cyatheales ====
- Alsophila nilgirensis
- Cyathea humilis
- Cyathea parksiae, rough tree-fern

==== Salviniales ====
- Azolla microphylla
- Azolla nilotica
- Azolla pinnata, ferny azolla
- Marsilea aegyptiaca, Egyptian water-clover
- Marsilea apposita
- Marsilea berhautii
- Marsilea burchellii
- Marsilea coromandelina
- Marsilea crenata
- Marsilea ephippiocarpa
- Marsilea fenestrata
- Marsilea minuta, dwarf water clover
- Marsilea quadrifolia, water shamrock
- Marsilea unicornis
- Marsilea vera
- Marsilea villifolia
- Salvinia cucullata, Asian watermoss
- Salvinia natans, floating fern

==== Schizaeales ====
- Lygodium microphyllum
- Schizaea pusilla

==== Osmundales ====
- Osmunda hugeliana
- Osmunda regalis, royal fern

=== Isoetopsida ===
- Isoetes alstonii
- Isoetes bischlerae
- Isoetes bolanderi
- Isoetes boliviensis
- Isoetes cleefii
- Isoetes coromandelina
- Isoetes echinospora, spring quillwort
- Isoetes engelmannii
- Isoetes giessii
- Isoetes howellii
- Isoetes lacustris, common quillwort
- Isoetes lechleri
- Isoetes maritima
- Isoetes nuttallii
- Isoetes palmeri
- Isoetes riparia
- Isoetes toximontana
- Isoetes tuckermanii
- Isoetes welwitschii

=== Lycopodiopsida ===
Clubmosses and firmosses

- Huperzia cumingii
- Huperzia dacrydioides
- Lycopodiella appressa
- Lycopodiella inundata, marsh clubmoss
- Selaginella balansae
- Selaginella denticulata, toothed-leaved clubmoss

=== Psilotopsida ===
- Ophioglossum azoricum
- Ophioglossum lusitanicum, least adder's-tongue
- Ophioglossum nudicaule
- Ophioglossum reticulatum

=== Horsetails ===
- Equisetum arvense, field horsetail
- Equisetum fluviatile, water horsetail
- Equisetum giganteum, southern giant horsetail
- Equisetum hyemale, rough horsetail
- Equisetum palustre, marsh horsetail
- Equisetum scirpoides, delicate horsetail
- Equisetum telmateia, great horsetail

== Gymnosperms ==
There are 419 species, 34 subspecies, and 66 varieties of gymnosperm assessed as least concern.

=== Cycads ===
Species

- Bowenia serrulata, Byfield fern
- Bowenia spectabilis
- Cycas angulata
- Cycas arnhemica
- Cycas basaltica
- Cycas calcicola
- Cycas canalis
- Cycas clivicola
- Cycas condaoensis
- Cycas furfuracea
- Cycas lane-poolei
- Cycas maconochiei
- Cycas media
- Cycas orientis
- Cycas pruinosa
- Cycas revoluta, fern palm
- Cycas thouarsii, Madagascar cycad
- Cycas xipholepis
- Dioon mejiae
- Encephalartos cycadifolius, Winterberg cycad
- Encephalartos hildebrandtii, Mombasa cycad
- Encephalartos poggei, Kananga cycad
- Encephalartos tegulaneus, Kenyan giant cycad
- Encephalartos turneri, Turner's cycad
- Encephalartos villosus, poor man's cycad
- Lepidozamia hopei
- Lepidozamia peroffskyana
- Macrozamia communis
- Macrozamia concinna, Nundle cycad
- Macrozamia diplomera
- Macrozamia douglasii
- Macrozamia dyeri
- Macrozamia fearnsidei
- Macrozamia fraseri
- Macrozamia glaucophylla
- Macrozamia heteromera
- Macrozamia johnsonii
- Macrozamia lucida
- Macrozamia macdonnellii
- Macrozamia macleayi
- Macrozamia miquelii
- Macrozamia montana
- Macrozamia mountperriensis
- Macrozamia polymorpha
- Macrozamia reducta
- Macrozamia riedlei

Subspecies

- Cycas arnhemica subsp. arnhemica
- Cycas arnhemica subsp. muninga
- Cycas arnhemica subsp. natja
- Cycas clivicola subsp. clivicola
- Cycas clivicola subsp. lutea
- Cycas maconochiei subsp. lanata
- Cycas maconochiei subsp. viridis
- Cycas media subsp. banksii
- Cycas media subsp. ensata
- Cycas media subsp. media
- Encephalartos tegulaneus subsp. tegulaneus

=== Conifers ===
Species

- Abies alba, silver fir
- Abies amabilis, Pacific silver fir
- Abies balsamea, balsam fir
- Abies cephalonica, Greek fir
- Abies chensiensis, Shensi fir
- Abies concolor, white fir
- Abies delavayi, Delavay's fir
- Abies densa, Sikkim fir
- Abies durangensis, Durango fir
- Abies fargesii, Farges' fir
- Abies firma, Momi fir
- Abies forrestii, Forrest's fir
- Abies grandis, grand fir
- Abies lasiocarpa, subalpine fir
- Abies magnifica, red fir
- Abies mariesii, Marie's fir
- Abies nephrolepis, Hinggan fir
- Abies nordmanniana, Caucasian fir
- Abies pindrow, pindrow fir
- Abies procera, noble fir
- Abies religiosa, sacred fir
- Abies sachalinensis, Sakhalin fir
- Abies sibirica, Siberian fir
- Abies veitchii, Veitch's fir
- Agathis robusta, Queensland kauri pine
- Araucaria bidwillii, bunya pine
- Araucaria columnaris, Cook's pine
- Araucaria cunninghamii, hoop pine
- Callitris arenaria, Bruce cypress
- Callitris canescens, Morrison's cypress pine
- Callitris columellaris, white cypress-pine
- Callitris endlicheri, black cypress-pine
- Callitris macleayana, stringybark pine
- Callitris muelleri, Illawarra cypress-pine
- Callitris preissii, Rottnest Island pine
- Callitris pyramidalis, Swan River cypress
- Callitris rhomboidea, Port Jackson pine
- Callitris verrucosa, scrub cypress-pine
- Calocedrus decurrens, incense cedar
- Cedrus deodara, deodar cedar
- Cephalotaxus fortunei, Fortune's yew plum
- Cephalotaxus harringtonii, Harrington's plum yew
- Cephalotaxus sinensis, Chinese plum yew
- Chamaecyparis pisifera, sawara cypress
- Chamaecyparis thyoides, Atlantic white cedar
- Cunninghamia lanceolata, Chinese fir
- Cupressus arizonica, Arizona cypress
- Cupressus lusitanica, cedar of Goa
- Cupressus macnabiana, Macnab cypress
- Cupressus sempervirens, Mediterranean cypress
- Cupressus torulosa, Himalayan cypress
- Diselma archeri, Cheshunt pine
- Juniperus arizonica, Arizona juniper
- Juniperus ashei, Ashe juniper
- Juniperus californica, California juniper
- Juniperus chinensis, Chinese juniper
- Juniperus coahuilensis
- Juniperus communis, common juniper
- Juniperus convallium
- Juniperus deppeana, alligator juniper
- Juniperus drupacea, Syrian juniper
- Juniperus durangensis
- Juniperus excelsa, Greek juniper
- Juniperus flaccida, weeping juniper
- Juniperus foetidissima, stinking juniper
- Juniperus formosana, Formosan juniper
- Juniperus horizontalis, Waukegan juniper
- Juniperus indica, black juniper
- Juniperus komarovii
- Juniperus monosperma, one-seed juniper
- Juniperus monticola
- Juniperus occidentalis, western juniper
- Juniperus osteosperma, Utah juniper
- Juniperus oxycedrus, prickly juniper
- Juniperus phoenicea, Phoenician juniper
- Juniperus pinchottii, Pinchot juniper
- Juniperus procera, African pencil cedar
- Juniperus procumbens
- Juniperus przewalskii, Przewalsi juniper
- Juniperus pseudosabina
- Juniperus recurva, sacred juniper
- Juniperus rigida, needle juniper
- Juniperus sabina, Savin juniper
- Juniperus saltuaria
- Juniperus scopulorum, Rocky Mountain juniper
- Juniperus semiglobosa
- Juniperus squamata, Nepalese juniper
- Juniperus thurifera, Spanish juniper
- Juniperus virginiana, eastern redcedar
- Keteleeria davidiana
- Larix decidua, European larch
- Larix gmelinii, Dahurian larch
- Larix griffithii, Sikkim larch
- Larix kaempferi, Japanese larch
- Larix laricina, tamarack
- Larix lyallii, alpine larch
- Larix occidentalis, western larch
- Larix potaninii, Chinese larch
- Larix sibirica, Siberian larch
- Microbiota decussata, Siberian cypress
- Papuacedrus papuana
- Picea abies, Norway spruce
- Picea crassifolia, Qinghai spruce
- Picea engelmannii, Engelmann spruce
- Picea glauca, white sprue
- Picea glehnii, Sakhalin spruce
- Picea jezoensis, Yezo spruce
- Picea koraiensis, Korean spruce
- Picea mariana, black spruce
- Picea obovata, Siberian spruce
- Picea orientalis, Oriental spruce
- Picea pungens, blue spruce
- Picea rubens, red spruce
- Picea schrenkiana, Schrenk's spruce
- Picea sitchensis, Sitka spruce
- Picea smithiana, Indian spruce
- Picea spinulosa, Sikkim spruce
- Picea wilsonii, Wilson spruce
- Pinus aristata, Colorado bristlecone pine
- Pinus arizonica, Arizona pine
- Pinus armandii, Armand's pine
- Pinus attenuata, knobcone pine
- Pinus ayacahuite, Mexican white pine
- Pinus banksiana, jack pine
- Pinus bhutanica, Bhutan white pine
- Pinus brutia, Calabrian pine
- Pinus bungeana, lace-bark pine
- Pinus canariensis, canary pine
- Pinus caribaea, Caribbean pine
- Pinus cembra, Arolla pine
- Pinus cembroides, Mexican nut pine
- Pinus clausa, sand pine
- Pinus contorta, lodgepole pine
- Pinus cubensis, Cuban pine
- Pinus densata, Gaoshan pine
- Pinus densiflora, Japanese red pine
- Pinus devoniana, Michoacan pine
- Pinus echinata, shortleaf pine
- Pinus edulis, Colorado pinyon
- Pinus elliottii, slash pine
- Pinus engelmannii, Apache pine
- Pinus flexilis, limber pine
- Pinus glabra, spruce pine
- Pinus gordoniana, Douglas pine
- Pinus halepensis, Aleppo pine
- Pinus hartwegii, Hartweg's pine
- Pinus heldreichii, Heldreich's pine
- Pinus herrerae, Herrera's pine
- Pinus hwangshanensis, Huangshan pine
- Pinus jeffreyi, Jeffrey pine
- Pinus kesiya, Khasia pine
- Pinus koraiensis, Korean pine
- Pinus lambertiana, sugar pine
- Pinus lawsonii, Lawson's pine
- Pinus leiophylla, smooth-leaved pine
- Pinus longaeva, Great Basin bristlecone pine
- Pinus luchuensis, Luchu pine
- Pinus luzmariae
- Pinus massoniana, Masson's pine
- Pinus maximinoi, thin-leaf pine
- Pinus monophylla, single leaf pinyon pine
- Pinus montezumae, Montezuma pine
- Pinus mugo, Mugo pine
- Pinus nigra, Austrian pine
- Pinus oocarpa, egg-cone pine
- Pinus parviflora, Japanese white pine
- Pinus patula, jelecote pine
- Pinus pinaster, maritime pine
- Pinus pinceana, weeping pinyon pine
- Pinus pinea, stone pine
- Pinus ponderosa, ponderosa pine
- Pinus pringlei, Pringle's pine
- Pinus pseudostrobus, smooth-bark Mexican pine
- Pinus pumila, dwarf Siberian pine
- Pinus pungens, Table Mountain pine
- Pinus quadrifolia, Parry pinyon
- Pinus remota, Texas pinyon pine
- Pinus resinosa, Norway pine
- Pinus rigida, hard pine
- Pinus roxburghii, chir pine
- Pinus sabiniana, gray pine
- Pinus serotina, pond pine
- Pinus sibirica, Siberian pine
- Pinus strobiformis, southwestern white pine
- Pinus strobus, eastern white pine
- Pinus sylvestris, Scots pine
- Pinus tabuliformis
- Pinus taeda, loblolly pine
- Pinus taiwanensis, Taiwan black pine
- Pinus teocote, Aztec pine
- Pinus thunbergii, Japanese black pine
- Pinus uncinata
- Pinus virginiana, Virginia pine
- Pinus wallichiana, Himalayan white pine
- Pinus yunnanensis, Yunnan pine
- Pseudotsuga menziesii, Douglas fir
- Taxodium distichum, bald cypress
- Taxodium mucronatum, Montezuma bald cypress
- Taxus baccata, common yew
- Taxus canadensis
- Taxus cuspidata, Japanese yew
- Tetraclinis articulata, sandarac
- Thuja occidentalis, northern white cedar
- Thuja plicata, western red-cedar
- Thujopsis dolabrata, hiba arbor-vitae
- Torreya grandis, Chinese nutmeg tree
- Torreya nucifera, Japanese nutmeg tree
- Tsuga chinensis, Chinese hemlock
- Tsuga diversifolia, northern Japanese hemlock
- Tsuga dumosa, Himalayan hemlock
- Tsuga heterophylla, western hemlock
- Tsuga mertensiana, mountain hemlock
- Widdringtonia nodiflora, mountain cypress
- Xanthocyparis nootkatensis, Alaska cedar

Subspecies

- Abies chensiensis subsp. chensiensis, Qin ling leng Shan
- Abies chensiensis subsp. salouenensis, Salween fir
- Abies chensiensis subsp. yulongxueshanensis
- Abies nordmanniana subsp. nordmanniana
- Abies sibirica subsp. semenovii, Tienshan fir
- Abies sibirica subsp. sibirica
- Agathis robusta subsp. robusta, Queensland kauri
- Juniperus excelsa subsp. excelsa
- Juniperus excelsa subsp. polycarpos, Turkestan juniper
- Juniperus oxycedrus subsp. badia
- Juniperus oxycedrus subsp. macrocarpa
- Juniperus oxycedrus subsp. oxycedrus
- Juniperus rigida subsp. conferta, shore juniper
- Juniperus rigida subsp. rigida
- Picea jezoensis subsp. hondoensis, Hondo spruce
- Picea jezoensis subsp. jezoensis
- Picea schrenkiana subsp. schrenkiana
- Picea schrenkiana subsp. tianschanica, Tian Shan spruce
- Pinus nigra subsp. laricio
- Pinus nigra subsp. nigra
- Pinus nigra subsp. pallasiana
- Pinus nigra subsp. salzmannii
- Tsuga mertensiana subsp. grandicona

Varieties

- Abies balsamea var. balsamea
- Abies delavayi var. delavayi
- Abies delavayi var. motuoensis, Medoc fir
- Abies fargesii var. fargesii
- Abies fargesii var. sutchuensis
- Abies forrestii var. ferreana
- Abies forrestii var. georgei, George's fir
- Abies sachalinensis var. mayriana
- Abies sachalinensis var. sachalinensis
- Abies veitchii var. veitchii
- Araucaria cunninghamii var. cunninghamii
- Araucaria cunninghamii var. papuana
- Cephalotaxus fortunei var. fortunei, Fortune's plum yew
- Cephalotaxus harringtonii var. harringtonii
- Cephalotaxus harringtonii var. nana
- Chamaecyparis thyoides var. henryae, southern white cedar
- Cupressus lusitanica var. lusitanica
- Cupressus torulosa var. torulosa
- Juniperus ashei var. ashei
- Juniperus chinensis var. chinensis
- Juniperus chinensis var. sargentii, Sargent juniper
- Juniperus convallium var. convallium
- Juniperus deppeana var. deppeana
- Juniperus deppeana var. pachyphlaea
- Juniperus flaccida var. flaccida
- Juniperus indica var. caespitosa
- Juniperus indica var. indica
- Juniperus occidentalis var. australis, Sierra juniper
- Juniperus occidentalis var. occidentalis
- Juniperus recurva var. recurva
- Juniperus sabina var. arenaria
- Juniperus sabina var. davurica
- Juniperus sabina var. sabina
- Juniperus virginiana var. silicicola, coast juniper
- Juniperus virginiana var. virginiana
- Keteleeria davidiana var. davidiana
- Larix gmelinii var. gmelinii
- Larix gmelinii var. japonica
- Larix gmelinii var. principis-rupprechtii, Prince Rupprecht's larch
- Larix potaninii var. macrocarpa
- Larix potaninii var. potaninii
- Picea koraiensis var. koraiensis
- Pinus armandii var. armandii
- Pinus caribaea var. hondurensis
- Pinus massoniana var. massoniana
- Pinus parviflora var. parviflora
- Pinus parviflora var. pentaphylla
- Pinus patula var. longipedunculata
- Pinus patula var. patula
- Pinus tabuliformis var. mukdensis
- Pinus tabuliformis var. tabuliformis
- Pinus taiwanensis var. taiwanensis
- Pinus wallichiana var. parva
- Pinus wallichiana var. wallichiana
- Pinus yunnanensis var. pygmaea
- Pinus yunnanensis var. yunnanensis
- Taxus cuspidata var. cuspidata
- Thujopsis dolabrata var. dolabrata
- Thujopsis dolabrata var. hondae
- Torreya grandis var. grandis
- Tsuga chinensis var. chinensis
- Tsuga chinensis var. oblongisquamata

==== Podocarpaceae ====
- Acmopyle pancheri
- Afrocarpus falcatus, bastard yellowwood
- Afrocarpus gracilior, East African yellowwood
- Dacrycarpus cinctus
- Dacrycarpus compactus
- Dacrycarpus cumingii
- Dacrycarpus dacrydioides
- Dacrycarpus expansus
- Dacrycarpus imbricatus
- Dacrycarpus kinabaluensis
- Dacrycarpus vieillardii
- Dacrydium araucarioides
- Dacrydium balansae
- Dacrydium beccarii
- Dacrydium cornwallianum
- Dacrydium cupressinum
- Dacrydium elatum
- Dacrydium ericoides
- Dacrydium gibbsiae
- Dacrydium nidulum
- Dacrydium novoguineense
- Dacrydium xanthandrum
- Falcatifolium papuanum
- Falcatifolium taxoides
- Halocarpus bidwillii, bog pine
- Halocarpus biformis, pink pine
- Lagarostrobos franklinii, Huon pine
- Lepidothamnus fonkii, Chilean rimu
- Lepidothamnus intermedius, yellow silver pine
- Lepidothamnus laxifolius
- Manoao colensoi, silver pine
- Microcachrys tetragona, creeping pine
- Nageia wallichiana
- Phyllocladus aspleniifolius
- Phyllocladus hypophyllus
- Phyllocladus toatoa
- Phyllocladus trichomanoides, mountain toatoa
- Phyllocladus trichomanoides var. alpinus, synonym of Phyllocladus alpinus
- Phyllocladus trichomanoides var. trichomanoides, synonym of Phyllocladus trichomanoides
- Podocarpus acutifolius, Westland totara
- Podocarpus aracensis
- Podocarpus borneensis
- Podocarpus bracteatus
- Podocarpus brasiliensis
- Podocarpus brassii
- Podocarpus celatus
- Podocarpus coriaceus
- Podocarpus crassigemma, synonym of Podocarpus archboldii
- Podocarpus dispermus, broad-leaved brown pine
- Podocarpus drouynianus, emu berry
- Podocarpus ekmanii
- Podocarpus elatus, Illawarra plum
- Podocarpus elongatus, Breede River yellowwood
- Podocarpus glaucus
- Podocarpus gnidioides
- Podocarpus grayae
- Podocarpus guatemalensis
- Podocarpus insularis
- Podocarpus laetus
- Podocarpus latifolius, broad-leaved yellowwood
- Podocarpus lawrencei, mountain plum pine
- Podocarpus ledermannii
- Podocarpus levis
- Podocarpus lucienii
- Podocarpus macrophyllus, Buddhist pine
- Podocarpus macrophyllus var. macrophyllus
- Podocarpus magnifolius
- Podocarpus milanjianus
- Podocarpus neriifolius
- Podocarpus neriifolius var. degeneri, synonym Podocarpus degeneri
- Podocarpus nivalis, alpine totara
- Podocarpus novae-caledoniae
- Podocarpus oleifolius
- Podocarpus pilgeri
- Podocarpus pseudobracteatus
- Podocarpus roraimae
- Podocarpus rubens
- Podocarpus salicifolius
- Podocarpus smithii
- Podocarpus spinulosus
- Podocarpus steyermarkii
- Podocarpus sylvestris
- Podocarpus tepuiensis
- Podocarpus totara
- Prumnopitys ferruginea, synonym of Pectinopitys ferruginea, miro
- Prumnopitys ferruginoides, synonym of Pectinopitys ferruginoides
- Prumnopitys taxifolia, mataī
- Retrophyllum comptonii
- Retrophyllum filicifolium
- Retrophyllum vitiense
- Sundacarpus amarus, choopoola

=== Gnetopsida ===
There are 76 species in the class Gnetopsida assessed as least concern.

==== Gnetales ====
- Gnetum bosavicum
- Gnetum camporum
- Gnetum costatum
- Gnetum cuspidatum
- Gnetum formosum
- Gnetum gnemon
- Gnetum gnemonoides
- Gnetum hainanense
- Gnetum klossii
- Gnetum latifolium
- Gnetum leptostachyum
- Gnetum leyboldii
- Gnetum macrostachyum
- Gnetum microcarpum
- Gnetum montanum
- Gnetum nodiflorum
- Gnetum paniculatum
- Gnetum parvifolium
- Gnetum pendulum
- Gnetum raya
- Gnetum schwackeanum
- Gnetum tenuifolium
- Gnetum ula
- Gnetum urens, bell bird's heart
- Gnetum venosum

==== Ephedrales ====
- Ephedra alata
- Ephedra altissima
- Ephedra americana
- Ephedra antisyphilitica, clipweed
- Ephedra aphylla
- Ephedra aspera, boundary ephedra
- Ephedra boelckei
- Ephedra breana
- Ephedra californica, California ephedra
- Ephedra chilensis
- Ephedra compacta
- Ephedra coryi
- Ephedra cutleri, Cutler morning-tea
- Ephedra dahurica
- Ephedra dawuensis
- Ephedra distachya, sea grape
- Ephedra fasciculata, Arizona joint-fir
- Ephedra fedtschenkoae
- Ephedra foeminea
- Ephedra foliata, shrubby horsetail
- Ephedra fragilis, joint pine
- Ephedra frustillata
- Ephedra intermedia
- Ephedra kardangensis
- Ephedra laristanica
- Ephedra likiangensis
- Ephedra lomatolepis
- Ephedra major
- Ephedra milleri
- Ephedra minuta
- Ephedra monosperma
- Ephedra multiflora
- Ephedra nevadensis, gray ephedra
- Ephedra ochreata
- Ephedra pachyclada
- Ephedra pedunculata, vine ephedra
- Ephedra przewalskii
- Ephedra regeliana
- Ephedra rhytidosperma
- Ephedra rituensis
- Ephedra rupestris
- Ephedra sarcocarpa
- Ephedra sinica, Chinese ephedra
- Ephedra somalensis
- Ephedra strobilacea
- Ephedra torreyana, Torrey ephedra
- Ephedra transitoria
- Ephedra triandra
- Ephedra trifurca, American ephedra
- Ephedra tweediana
- Ephedra viridis, green ephedra

== Dicotyledons ==
There are 4104 species, 86 subspecies, and 44 varieties of dicotyledon assessed as least concern.

=== Apiales ===
There are 74 species and two subspecies in the order Apiales assessed as least concern.

==== Apiaceae ====
- Ammoides pusilla, cerfolium
- Angelica atropurpurea
- Angelica heterocarpa
- Angelica sylvestris
- Anginon streyi
- Apium graveolens, wild celery
- Apium inundatum, lesser marshwort
- Apium nodiflorum, fool's-water-cress
- Berula erecta, lesser water-parsnip
- Bunium bulbocastanum, great pignut
- Carum verticillatum
- Centella asiatica, centella
- Cicuta bulbifera
- Cicuta douglasii
- Cicuta maculata
- Cicuta virosa, European waterhemlock
- Daucus gracilis
- Eryngium corniculatum
- Ferula communis, giant fennel
- Heracleum cyclocarpum, cyclocarpous cow-parsnip
- Heracleum freynianum, Freyn's cow-parsnip
- Heracleum leskovii, Leskov's cow-parsnip
- Heracleum mantegazzianum, Mantegazzi's cow-parsnip
- Heracleum maximum
- Heracleum schelkovnikovii, Shelkovnikov's cow-parsnip
- Heracleum sommieri, Sommier's cow-parsnip
- Heracleum trachyloma, downy cow-parsnip
- Lilaeopsis occidentalis
- Marlothiella gummifera
- Oenanthe aquatica, fine-leaved water-dropwort
- Oenanthe divaricata
- Oenanthe fistulosa, tubular water-dropwort
- Oenanthe globulosa
- Oenanthe javanica, water dropwort
- Oenanthe sarmentosa
- Oenanthe silaifolia, narrow-leaved water-dropwort
- Oxypolis occidentalis
- Oxypolis rigidior
- Petagnia saniculifolia
- Peucedanum adae, Ada's hog's-fennel
- Rughidia cordatum
- Seseli petraeum, stone seseli
- Seseli ponticum, pontic seseli
- Sium sisaroideum
- Sium suave

==== Araliaceae ====
Species

- Aralia elata
- Aralia excelsa
- Astropanax myrianthus
- Cheirodendron bastardianum
- Cussonia zimmermannii
- Didymopanax morototoni
- Hedera helix
- Heptapleurum actinophyllum
- Heptapleurum bractescens
- Heptapleurum digitatum
- Heptapleurum hullettii
- Heptapleurum taiwanianum
- Hydrocotyle americana
- Hydrocotyle hitchcockii
- Hydrocotyle javanica
- Hydrocotyle ranunculoides
- Hydrocotyle sibthorpioides
- Hydrocotyle umbellata
- Hydrocotyle vulgaris, marsh pennywort
- Neopanax arboreus
- Neopanax colensoi
- Oreopanax andreanus
- Oreopanax ecuadorensis
- Pentapanax leschenaultii
- Plerandra crassipes
- Plerandra gabriellae
- Plerandra leptophylla
- Plerandra osyana
- Plerandra pancheri
- Plerandra plerandroides
- Plerandra reginae
- Plerandra seemanniana
- Plerandra veilloniorum
- Polyscias marchionensis
- Polyscias verrucosa
- Schefflera vitiensis
- Sciodaphyllum sprucei

Subspecies

- Plerandra osyana subsp. osyana
- Plerandra osyana subsp. toto

=== Aquifoliales ===
==== Aquifoliaceae (hollies) ====
Species

- Citronella mucronata
- Ilex cymosa
- Ilex diospyroides
- Ilex glomerata
- Ilex mucronata

==== Stemonuraceae ====
- Discophora guianensis
- Discophora montana
- Gastrolepis austrocaledonica
- Gomphandra australiana
- Gomphandra capitulata
- Gomphandra cumingiana
- Gomphandra luzoniensis
- Gomphandra lysipetala
- Gomphandra mappioides
- Gomphandra mollis
- Gomphandra montana
- Gomphandra papuana
- Gomphandra pseudoprasina
- Gomphandra quadrifida
- Gomphandra rarinervis
- Gomphandra tetrandra
- Grisollea myriantha
- Irvingbaileya australis
- Lasianthera africana
- Medusanthera gracilis
- Medusanthera laxiflora
- Medusanthera megistocarpa
- Stemonurus ammui
- Stemonurus grandifolius
- Stemonurus malaccensis
- Stemonurus monticola
- Stemonurus scorpioides
- Stemonurus secundiflorus
- Stemonurus umbellatus

=== Asterales ===
Species

- Achillea crithmifolia
- Achillea glaberrima
- Achillea millefolium, milfoil
- Achillea ptarmica, sneezewort
- Acmella paniculata, panicled spot flower
- Acmella uliginosa
- Adenostemma caffrum
- Aedesia glabra
- Aetheolaena involucrata
- Ageratina macbridei
- Ageratina sodiroi
- Anacyclus ciliatus, ciliated German pellitory
- Anisopappus pseudopinnatifidus
- Aphanactis jamesoniana
- Aphanactis ollgaardii
- Arctanthemum arcticum
- Arctotis frutescens
- Aristeguietia glutinosa
- Arnica montana
- Artemisia eriantha
- Artemisia genipi
- Artemisia umbelliformis, alpine wormwood
- Aspilia helianthoides
- Aster subulatus
- Bellis bernardii
- Bellis caerulescens
- Bellis hyrcanica, Hyrkanian daisy
- Bellium nivale
- Bidens beckii
- Bidens cernua, nodding bur-marigold
- Bidens frondosa
- Bidens hyperborea
- Bidens trichosperma
- Bidens tripartita, trifid bur-marigold
- Bidens vulgata
- Boltonia asteroides
- Caesulia axillaris, pink node flower
- Calendula maderensis
- Canadanthus modestus
- Carduus nyassanus
- Carlina gummifera, stemless atractylis
- Centipeda minima, spreading sneeze weed
- Chamaemelum nobile, Roman chamomile
- Chevreulia lycopodioides, clubmoss cudweed
- Chrysanthellum pusillum
- Cirsium brachycephalum
- Cirsium dealbatum, whitish thistle
- Cirsium imereticum, Imeretian thistle
- Cirsium latifolium
- Cirsium pugnax, armed thistle
- Cirsium rhinoceros
- Cirsium sosnowskyi, Sosnowsky's thistle
- Conyza clarenceana
- Cotula paludosa
- Cousinia brachyptera, short-winged cousinia
- Cousinia daralaghezica, daralaghesian cousinia
- Cousinia macrocephala, macrocephalous cousinia
- Crassocephalum gracile
- Crassocephalum picridifolium
- Crassothonna clavifolia, syn. Othonna clavifolia
- Cyathocline lutea
- Cyathocline purpurea
- Dendrosenecio keniensis
- Dicoma cana
- Diplostephium antisanense
- Diplostephium ericoides
- Distephanus qazmi
- Doellingeria umbellata
- Doronicum corsicum
- Dubautia plantaginea
- Eclipta angustata
- Emilia zeylanica
- Enydra fluctuans, buffalo spinach
- Epaltes divaricata
- Eremothamnus marlothianus
- Erigeron elatus
- Erigeron lonchophyllus
- Eriocephalus klinghardtensis
- Ethulia conyzoides
- Ethulia vernonioides
- Eucephalus engelmannii
- Eupatorium maculatum
- Eupatorium perfoliatum
- Eurybia radula
- Euryops walterorum
- Euthamia graminifolia
- Felicia alba
- Felicia gunillae
- Fitchia rapensis
- Fitchia speciosa, Rarotonga fitchia
- Fleischmannia obscurifolia
- Gnaphalium palustre
- Gnaphalium unionis
- Grangea maderaspatana
- Gynoxys acostae
- Gynoxys hallii
- Helianthus argophyllus
- Helianthus atrorubens
- Helianthus bolanderi
- Helianthus grosseserratus
- Helianthus maximiliani
- Helianthus silphioides
- Helichrysum paulayanum
- Hemisteptia lyrata
- Hypochaeris angustifolia
- Hypochaeris sonchoides
- Inula acaulis
- Iva xanthifolia
- Jaegeria gracilis, Galapagos jaegeria
- Jaumea carnosa
- Lactuca aurea
- Lactuca palmensis
- Lactuca pancicii
- Lasiopogon ponticulus
- Lasthenia glaberrima
- Launaea rhynchocarpa
- Launaea socotrana
- Leontopodium alpinum, edelweiss
- Leucheria suaveolens, vanilla daisy
- Liabum kingii
- Libinhania acicularis, syn. Helichrysum aciculare
- Libinhania arachnoides, syn. Helichrysum arachnoides
- Libinhania balfourii, syn. Helichrysum balfourii
- Libinhania rosulata, syn. Helichrysum rosulatum
- Libinhania sphaerocephala, syn. Helichrysum sphaerocephalum
- Litogyne gariepina
- Macraea laricifolia, needle-leafed daisy
- Microseris borealis
- Monticalia myrsinites
- Nassauvia gaudichaudii, coastal nassauvia
- Nassauvia serpens, snakeplant
- Nidorella nordenstamii
- Oclemena nemoralis
- Onopordum cinereum, ash-coloured Scotch thistle
- Oparanthus coriaceus
- Oparanthus rapensis
- Osteospermum muricatum
- Osteospermum sanctae-helenae, boneseed
- Pectis caymanensis, tea banker
- Pectis subsquarrosa, pectis
- Pectis tenuifolia, oily pectis
- Pentatrichia avasmontana
- Pentzia tomentosa
- Petasites frigidus
- Phagnalon bennettii
- Plagiocheilus solivaeformis
- Pluchea bequaertii
- Pluchea sordida
- Prenanthes abietina, fir-tree rattlesnake root
- Psephellus carthalinicus, Carthalinian psephellus
- Psephellus karabaghensis, Karabaghian psephellus
- Psephellus leucophyllus, white-leaved psephellus
- Psephellus prokhanovii, Prokhanov's psephellus
- Psephellus somcheticus, Armenian psephellus
- Psephellus vvedenskii, solnechnik
- Psilocarphus tenellus
- Pteronia spinulosa
- Pulicaria arabica
- Pulicaria diversifolia
- Pulicaria elegans
- Pulicaria inuloides
- Pulicaria laciniata
- Pulicaria lanata
- Pulicaria scabra
- Pulicaria sicula
- Pulicaria stephanocarpa
- Pulicaria vulgaris, small fleabane
- Rhaponticum scariosum, giant scabiosa
- Santolina impressa
- Santolina semidentata
- Scalesia affinis, radiate-headed scalesia
- Scorzoneroides atlantica
- Senecio aquaticus
- Senecio arborescens
- Senecio falklandicus, woolly Falkland daisy
- Senecio hydrophilus
- Senecio morotonensis
- Senecio vaginatus, smooth Falkland daisy
- Senecio wightii, swamp ragwort
- Solidago latissimifolia
- Solidago ohioensis
- Solidago patula
- Solidago riddellii
- Solidago uliginosa
- Sonchus palustris
- Sphaeranthus africanus
- Sphaeranthus amaranthoides
- Sphaeranthus chandleri
- Sphaeranthus indicus
- Sphaeranthus steetzii
- Sphaeranthus ukambensis
- Symphyotrichum boreale
- Symphyotrichum ciliatum
- Symphyotrichum lanceolatum
- Symphyotrichum praealtum
- Symphyotrichum puniceum
- Tanacetum cinerariifolium, Dalmatian pyrethrum
- Taraxacum desertorum, desert dandelion
- Verbesina latisquama
- Vernonia arborescens, fleabane
- Vernonia cockburniana
- Wedelia chinensis, Chinese wedelia
- Werneria pumila

Subspecies

- Centaurea micrantha subsp. herminii
- Lactuca virosa subsp. cornigera

Varieties

- Pectis caymanensis var. caymanensis

=== Austrobaileyales ===
==== Schisandraceae ====
- Illicium burmanicum
- Illicium floridanum
- Illicium henryi
- Illicium jiadifengpi
- Illicium lanceolatum
- Illicium majus
- Illicium merrillianum
- Illicium micranthum
- Illicium parvifolium
- Illicium petelotii
- Illicium simonsii
- Illicium stapfii
- Illicium sumatranum

==== Trimeniaceae ====
- Trimenia neocaledonica
- Trimenia nukuhivensis
- Trimenia papuana
- Trimenia weinmanniifolia
- Trimenia weinmanniifolia subsp. marquesensis, synonym of Trimenia marquesensis

=== Boraginales ===
==== Boraginaceae ====
Species

- Cystostemon socotranus
- Heliotropium balfourii
- Heliotropium curassavicum
- Heliotropium ovalifolium
- Heliotropium socotranum
- Myosotis debilis
- Myosotis laxa, tufted forget-me-not
- Myosotis secunda, creeping forget-me-not
- Myosotis soleirolii
- Myosotis welwitschii
- Omphalodes littoralis
- Pulmonaria officinalis, lungwort
- Rotula aquatica
- Tiquilia darwinii
- Tiquilia fusca
- Tiquilia galapagoa
- Tournefortia astrotricha
- Tournefortia pubescens, white-haired tournefortia
- Trichodesma laxiflorum
- Trichodesma microcalyx
- Varronia bahamensis
- Varronia brittonii
- Varronia brownei, black sage
- Varronia bullata
- Varronia lima
- Varronia polycephala

Subspecies

- Myosotis decumbens subsp. rifana
- Varronia bullata subsp. bullata
- Varronia bullata subsp. humilis

Varieties

- Cordia sebestena var. sebestena
- Tournefortia astrotricha var. astrotricha

==== Cordiaceae ====
- Cordia alliodora, manjack
- Cordia boissieri
- Cordia collococca, clammy cherry
- Cordia laevigata, clam cherry
- Cordia millenii, drum tree
- Cordia sebestena, Geiger tree
- Cordia subcordata
- Cordia sulcata, white manjack
- Varronia polycephala

==== Heliotropiaceae ====
- Heliotropium arboreum

==== Other Boraginales species ====
- Ehretia dicksonii

=== Brassicales ===
There are 45 species assessed as least concern.

==== Brassicaceae ====
- Alyssum dagestanicum, Dagestanian alyssum
- Armoracia rusticana, horseradish
- Barbarea balcana, Balkan yellow rocket
- Barbarea integrifolia
- Barbarea plantaginea
- Barbarea rupicola
- Barbarea vulgaris, herb barbaras
- Boleum asperum
- Brassica balearica
- Brassica montana
- Brassica nivalis
- Cardamine bulbosa
- Cardamine pensylvanica
- Cardamine uliginosa
- Crambe santosii
- Crambe strigosa
- Diplotaxis gomez-campoi
- Diplotaxis ibicensis
- Diplotaxis ilorcitana
- Erucastrum rostratum
- Eutrema edwardsii
- Ionopsidium acaule
- Isatis bungeana, Bunge's woad
- Lepidium cardamines
- Lepidium heterophyllum, Smith's pepperwort
- Lepidium villarsii
- Nasturtium officinale, watercress
- Neobeckia aquatica
- Rorippa amphibia, great yellow-cress
- Rorippa aurea
- Rorippa austriaca, Austrian field cress
- Rorippa curvisiliqua
- Rorippa islandica, marsh cress
- Rorippa kerneri
- Rorippa lippizensis
- Rorippa microphylla, narrow-fruited water-cress
- Rorippa sylvestris, creeping yellow cress
- Schivereckia podolica
- Sisymbrella aspera
- Sisymbrium supinum
- Subularia aquatica, awlwort

==== Capparaceae ====
- Capparis spinosa, caper
- Cleome socotrana
- Crateva religiosa
- Cynophalla flexuosa, synonym of Morisonia flexuosa
- Cynophalla hastata, synonym of Morisonia hastata
- Maerua andradae

==== Moringaceae ====
- Moringa oleifera

==== Resedaceae ====
- Forchhammeria trifoliata
- Ochradenus socotranus
- Reseda viridis

=== Buxales ===
- Buxus citrifolia

=== Callitrichales ===
- Callitriche brutia, pedunculate water-starwort
- Callitriche christensenii
- Callitriche cophocarpa
- Callitriche hermaphroditica, autumnal water-starwort
- Callitriche heterophylla, two-headed water-starwort
- Callitriche lenisulca
- Callitriche marginata
- Callitriche palustris, narrow-fruited water-starwort
- Callitriche platycarpa, various-leaved water-starwort
- Callitriche stagnalis, common water-starwort
- Callitriche terrestris, terrestrial water-starwort
- Callitriche truncata
- Hippuris lanceolata
- Hippuris tetraphylla
- Hippuris vulgaris

=== Campanulales ===
There are 25 species and four subspecies in Campanulales assessed as least concern.

==== Campanulaceae ====
Species

- Burmeistera sodiroana
- Campanula aparinoides
- Campanula balfourii
- Campanula morettiana
- Campanula serrata
- Downingia elegans
- Downingia laeta
- Favratia zoysii
- Lobelia aberdarica
- Lobelia alsinoides
- Lobelia cardinalis
- Lobelia dortmanna, water lobelia
- Lobelia heyneana
- Lobelia kalmii
- Lobelia siphilitica
- Lobelia spicata
- Lobelia zeylanica
- Musschia aurea
- Namacodon schinzianum
- Physoplexis comosa
- Siphocampylus scandens
- Sphenoclea zeylanica
- Wahlenbergia polycephala
- Wahlenbergia pulchella

Subspecies

- Wahlenbergia pulchella subsp. mbalensis
- Wahlenbergia pulchella subsp. paradoxa
- Wahlenbergia pulchella subsp. pedicellata
- Wahlenbergia pulchella subsp. pulchella

==== Goodeniaceae ====
- Scaevola floribunda
- Scaevola micrantha

=== Canellales ===
==== Canellaceae ====
- Canella winterana
- Cinnamodendron dinisii
- Cinnamodendron sampaioanum
- Cinnamosma fragrans
- Cinnamosma madagascariensis

==== Winteraceae ====
- Drimys angustifolia
- Drimys granadensis
- Drimys roraimensis
- Drimys winteri
- Pseudowintera axillaris
- Pseudowintera colorata
- Pseudowintera traversii
- Tasmannia piperita
- Zygogynum calothyrsum
- Zygogynum sylvestre

=== Caryophyllales ===
There are 928 species and two subspecies in the order Caryophyllales assessed as least concern.

==== Aizoaceae ====
- Amphibolia obscura
- Antimima argentea
- Antimima aurasensis
- Antimima buchubergensis
- Antimima modesta
- Antimima quartzitica
- Astridia hallii
- Brownanthus namibensis, syn. of Mesembryanthemum namibense
- Brownanthus pubescens
- Cephalophyllum compressum
- Cephalophyllum confusum
- Delosperma klinghardtianum
- Juttadinteria deserticola
- Juttadinteria simpsonii
- Juttadinteria suavissima
- Lithops fulviceps
- Lithops ruschiorum
- Lithops vallis-mariae
- Psammophora nissenii
- Psammophora saxicola
- Ruschia namusmontana
- Sesuvium edmondstonii

==== Amaranthaceae ====
Species

- Aerva microphylla
- Aerva revoluta
- Alternanthera filifolia
- Alternanthera sessilis, sessile joyweed
- Amaranthus anderssonii
- Amaranthus sclerantoides
- Amaranthus tuberculatus
- Centrostachys aquatica

Subspecies

- Alternanthera filifolia subsp. filifolia

==== Cactus species ====
- Acanthocereus tetragonus
- Ariocarpus fissuratus, chautle-living rock
- Ariocarpus retusus
- Ariocarpus trigonus
- Armatocereus cartwrightianus
- Armatocereus godingianus
- Armatocereus laetus
- Armatocereus matucanensis
- Armatocereus procerus
- Armatocereus rauhii
- Armatocereus riomajensis
- Arrojadoa penicillata
- Arrojadoa rhodantha
- Arthrocereus rondonianus
- Arthrocereus spinosissimus
- Astrophytum capricorne
- Astrophytum myriostigma
- Austrocactus bertinii
- Austrocylindropuntia floccosa
- Austrocylindropuntia shaferi
- Austrocylindropuntia subulata, Eve's pin
- Austrocylindropuntia verschaffeltii
- Austrocylindropuntia vestita
- Aylostera einsteinii
- Aylostera heliosa
- Aylostera steinmannii
- Aztekium ritteri
- Bergerocactus emoryi, golden-spined cereus
- Blossfeldia liliputana
- Brachycereus nesioticus, lava cactus
- Brasiliopuntia brasiliensis
- Browningia hertlingiana
- Browningia microsperma
- Browningia pilleifera
- Calymmanthium substerile
- Carnegiea gigantea, saguaro
- Castellanosia caineana
- Cephalocereus apicicephalium
- Cephalocereus columna-trajani
- Cephalocereus macrocephalus, syn. Neobuxbaumia macrocephala
- Cereus aethiops
- Cereus albicaulis
- Cereus bicolor
- Cereus fernambucensis
- Cereus hexagonus, lady of the night cactus
- Cereus hildmannianus, hedge cactus
- Cereus insularis
- Cereus jamacaru
- Cereus lamprospermus
- Cereus lanosus
- Cereus phatnospermus
- Cereus repandus, apple cactus
- Cereus spegazzinii
- Cereus stenogonus
- Cereus trigonodendron
- Cipocereus minensis
- Cipocereus pleurocarpus
- Cleistocactus baumannii
- Cleistocactus brookeae
- Cleistocactus buchtienii
- Cleistocactus candelilla
- Cleistocactus fieldianus
- Cleistocactus hyalacanthus
- Cleistocactus icosagonus
- Cleistocactus laniceps
- Cleistocactus leonensis
- Cleistocactus pachycladus
- Cleistocactus parviflorus
- Cleistocactus ritteri
- Cleistocactus samaipatanus
- Cleistocactus sepium
- Cleistocactus smaragdiflorus
- Cleistocactus strausii
- Cleistocactus tenuiserpens
- Cleistocactus tominensis
- Coleocephalocereus aureus
- Coleocephalocereus fluminensis
- Consolea macracantha
- Consolea millspaughii
- Consolea moniliformis
- Consolea nashii
- Consolea rubescens
- Copiapoa calderana
- Copiapoa cinerea
- Copiapoa coquimbana
- Copiapoa dealbata
- Copiapoa krainziana
- Copiapoa longistaminea
- Copiapoa montana
- Corryocactus brevistylus
- Corryocactus chachapoyensis
- Corryocactus melanotrichus
- Corynopuntia aggeria
- Corynopuntia clavata
- Corynopuntia emoryi
- Corynopuntia grahamii
- Corynopuntia invicta
- Corynopuntia kunzei
- Corynopuntia moelleri
- Corynopuntia parishiorum, Parish's club-cholla
- Corynopuntia pulchella, sand cholla
- Corynopuntia schottii
- Corynopuntia vilis
- Coryphantha clavata
- Coryphantha compacta
- Coryphantha cornifera, rhinoceros cactus
- Coryphantha delaetiana
- Coryphantha delicata
- Coryphantha difficilis
- Coryphantha durangensis
- Coryphantha echinoidea
- Coryphantha echinus, cory-cactus hedgehog
- Coryphantha elephantidens, elephant's tooth
- Coryphantha erecta
- Coryphantha georgii
- Coryphantha glanduligera
- Coryphantha glassii
- Coryphantha gracilis
- Coryphantha jalpanensis
- Coryphantha longicornis
- Coryphantha macromeris, nipple beehive cactus
- Coryphantha neglecta
- Coryphantha nickelsiae, Nickels' pincushion cactus
- Coryphantha octacantha
- Coryphantha ottonis
- Coryphantha pallida
- Coryphantha poselgeriana
- Coryphantha pseudoechinus
- Coryphantha pseudonickelsiae
- Coryphantha ramillosa, bunched cory cactus
- Coryphantha recurvata, recurved corycactus
- Coryphantha robustispina, Pima pineapple cactus
- Coryphantha salinensis
- Coryphantha sulcata, finger cactus
- Coryphantha tripugionacantha
- Coryphantha vogtherriana
- Coryphantha werdermannii
- Coryphantha wohlschlageri
- Cumarinia odorata
- Cumulopuntia boliviana
- Cumulopuntia chichensis
- Cumulopuntia rossiana
- Cumulopuntia sphaerica
- Cylindropuntia abyssi, Peach Springs cholla
- Cylindropuntia acanthocarpa
- Cylindropuntia alcahes
- Cylindropuntia arbuscula
- Cylindropuntia bigelovii, teddy-bear cholla
- Cylindropuntia californica, snake cholla
- Cylindropuntia calmalliana
- Cylindropuntia caribaea
- Cylindropuntia cholla
- Cylindropuntia davisii
- Cylindropuntia delgadilloana
- Cylindropuntia echinocarpa
- Cylindropuntia fulgida, jumping cholla
- Cylindropuntia ganderi
- Cylindropuntia imbricata
- Cylindropuntia kleiniae
- Cylindropuntia leptocaulis, tesajo cactus
- Cylindropuntia lindsayi
- Cylindropuntia molesta
- Cylindropuntia multigeniculata
- Cylindropuntia munzii
- Cylindropuntia prolifera
- Cylindropuntia ramosissima
- Cylindropuntia sanfelipensis
- Cylindropuntia spinosior, cane cholla
- Cylindropuntia tesajo
- Cylindropuntia thurberi
- Cylindropuntia tunicata
- Cylindropuntia versicolor
- Cylindropuntia whipplei
- Cylindropuntia wolfii
- Denmoza rhodacantha
- Discocactus catingicola
- Discocactus cephaliaciculosus
- Discocactus placentiformis
- Disocactus ackermannii
- Disocactus macranthus
- Disocactus nelsonii
- Disocactus quezaltecus
- Disocactus speciosus
- Echinocactus horizonthalonius, Turk's-head cactus
- Echinocactus polycephalus, cottontop cactus – now Homalocephala polycephala
- Echinocactus texensis, horse crippler – now Homalocephala texensis
- Echinocereus acifer
- Echinocereus adustus
- Echinocereus arizonicus, Arizona hedgehog cactus
- Echinocereus berlandieri, Berlandier's hedgehog cactus
- Echinocereus bonkerae
- Echinocereus brandegeei
- Echinocereus bristolii
- Echinocereus cinerascens
- Echinocereus coccineus, scarlet hedgehog cactus
- Echinocereus dasyacanthus, spiny hedgehog cactus
- Echinocereus engelmannii, Engelmann's hedgehog cactus
- Echinocereus enneacanthus, pitaya
- Echinocereus fasciculatus
- Echinocereus fendleri, Fendler's hedgehog cactus
- Echinocereus ferreirianus
- Echinocereus grandis, San Esteban hedgehog
- Echinocereus knippelianus
- Echinocereus laui
- Echinocereus ledingii, Leding's hedgehog cactus
- Echinocereus longisetus
- Echinocereus nicholii, Nichol's hedgehog cactus
- Echinocereus pacificus
- Echinocereus palmeri
- Echinocereus pamanesiorum
- Echinocereus papillosus, allicoche hedgehog cactus
- Echinocereus parkeri
- Echinocereus pectinatus, órgano-pequeño peine
- Echinocereus pensilis
- Echinocereus pentalophus, lady-finger hedgehog cactus
- Echinocereus polyacanthus
- Echinocereus poselgeri, dahlia apple cactus
- Echinocereus primolanatus
- Echinocereus pseudopectinatus, devil-thorn
- Echinocereus rayonesensis
- Echinocereus reichenbachii, Reichenbach's hedgehog cactus
- Echinocereus rigidissimus, Arizona rainbow cactus
- Echinocereus russanthus, rusty hedgehog cactus
- Echinocereus santaritensis
- Echinocereus scheeri
- Echinocereus scopulorum
- Echinocereus spinigemmatus
- Echinocereus stoloniferus
- Echinocereus stramineus, strawberry hedgehog cactus
- Echinocereus triglochidiatus, mound hedgehog cactus
- Echinocereus viereckii
- Echinocereus viridiflorus, green-flower hedgehog cactus
- Echinopsis arachnacantha
- Echinopsis aurea
- Echinopsis breviflora
- Echinopsis bridgesii
- Echinopsis calochlora
- Echinopsis calorubra
- Echinopsis camarguensis
- Echinopsis candicans
- Echinopsis chiloensis
- Echinopsis chrysochete
- Echinopsis cinnabarina
- Echinopsis cuzcoensis
- Echinopsis densispina
- Echinopsis deserticola
- Echinopsis ferox
- Echinopsis formosa
- Echinopsis haematacantha
- Echinopsis huascha
- Echinopsis jajoana
- Echinopsis lageniformis
- Echinopsis lateritia
- Echinopsis leucantha
- Echinopsis mamillosa
- Echinopsis marsoneri
- Echinopsis maximiliana
- Echinopsis mirabilis
- Echinopsis obrepanda
- Echinopsis oxygona
- Echinopsis pachanoi, San Pedro cactus
- Echinopsis pamparuizii
- Echinopsis pentlandii
- Echinopsis peruviana
- Echinopsis pugionacantha
- Echinopsis quadratiumbonata
- Echinopsis rhodotricha
- Echinopsis rojasii
- Echinopsis rowleyi
- Echinopsis saltensis
- Echinopsis schickendantzii
- Echinopsis schieliana
- Echinopsis spiniflora
- Echinopsis stilowiana
- Echinopsis strigosa
- Echinopsis tacaquirensis
- Echinopsis tarijensis
- Echinopsis tegeleriana
- Echinopsis thionantha
- Echinopsis tiegeliana
- Echinopsis tunariensis
- Echinopsis volliana
- Echinopsis werdermanniana
- Echinopsis yuquina
- Epiphyllum anguliger, fishbone cactus
- Epiphyllum cartagense
- Epiphyllum crenatum
- Epiphyllum hookeri, nightblooming cactus
- Epiphyllum oxypetalum, Dutchman's pipe cactus
- Epiphyllum phyllanthus, climbing cactus
- Epiphyllum pumilum
- Epiphyllum thomasianum
- Epithelantha bokei, Boke's button cactus
- Epithelantha micromeris, button cactus
- Eriosyce aurata
- Eriosyce bulbocalyx
- Eriosyce curvispina
- Eriosyce engleri
- Eriosyce eriosyzoides
- Eriosyce garaventae
- Eriosyce heinrichiana
- Eriosyce megliolii
- Eriosyce paucicostata
- Eriosyce strausiana
- Eriosyce subgibbosa
- Eriosyce villicumensis
- Eriosyce villosa
- Escobaria alversonii, cushion fox-tail cactus
- Escobaria chihuahuensis
- Escobaria dasyacantha, Big Bend foxtail cactus
- Escobaria duncanii
- Escobaria emskoetteriana, Robert's foxtail cactus
- Escobaria hesteri, Hester's cory cactus
- Escobaria minima, birdfoot cactus
- Escobaria missouriensis, Missouri foxtail cactus
- Escobaria sneedii, carpet foxtail cactus
- Escobaria tuberculosa, corncob cactus
- Escobaria vivipara, pincushion cactus
- Escontria chiotilla
- Espostoa blossfeldiorum
- Espostoa calva
- Espostoa hylaea
- Espostoa lanata, cotton ball cactus
- Espostoa melanostele
- Espostoa mirabilis
- Espostoa senilis
- Espostoa utcubambensis
- Eulychnia acida
- Eulychnia breviflora
- Eulychnia castanea
- Eulychnia iquiquensis
- Facheiroa squamosa
- Facheiroa ulei
- Ferocactus cylindraceus, California barrel cactus
- Ferocactus diguetii
- Ferocactus echidne
- Ferocactus emoryi, Emory's barrel cactus
- Ferocactus glaucescens
- Ferocactus gracilis
- Ferocactus hamatacanthus, biznaga-de-limilla
- Ferocactus johnstonianus
- Ferocactus latispinus
- Ferocactus lindsayi
- Ferocactus peninsulae
- Ferocactus pilosus
- Ferocactus viridescens, San Diego barrel cactus
- Frailea castanea
- Frailea pumila
- Frailea pygmaea
- Grusonia bradtiana
- Gymnocalycium andreae
- Gymnocalycium anisitsii
- Gymnocalycium baldianum
- Gymnocalycium bayrianum
- Gymnocalycium berchtii
- Gymnocalycium bodenbenderianum
- Gymnocalycium bruchii
- Gymnocalycium calochlorum
- Gymnocalycium capillaense
- Gymnocalycium castellanosii
- Gymnocalycium erinaceum
- Gymnocalycium eurypleurum
- Gymnocalycium gibbosum
- Gymnocalycium glaucum
- Gymnocalycium hossei
- Gymnocalycium hyptiacanthum
- Gymnocalycium kieslingii
- Gymnocalycium kroenleinii
- Gymnocalycium marsoneri
- Gymnocalycium mesopotamicum
- Gymnocalycium mihanovichii
- Gymnocalycium monvillei
- Gymnocalycium mostii
- Gymnocalycium nigriareolatum
- Gymnocalycium ochoterenae
- Gymnocalycium pflanzii
- Gymnocalycium pugionacanthum
- Gymnocalycium reductum
- Gymnocalycium rhodantherum
- Gymnocalycium ritterianum
- Gymnocalycium robustum
- Gymnocalycium saglionis
- Gymnocalycium schickendantzii
- Gymnocalycium schroederianum
- Gymnocalycium spegazzinii
- Gymnocalycium stellatum
- Gymnocalycium stenopleurum
- Gymnocalycium striglianum
- Gymnocalycium taningaense
- Gymnocalycium uebelmannianum
- Haageocereus acranthus
- Haageocereus chilensis
- Haageocereus decumbens
- Haageocereus platinospinus
- Haageocereus pseudomelanostele
- Haageocereus pseudoversicolor
- Haageocereus versicolor
- Harrisia adscendens
- Harrisia balansae
- Harrisia eriophora, fragrant prickly apple
- Harrisia gracilis
- Harrisia martinii
- Harrisia pomanensis
- Harrisia regelii
- Harrisia tetracantha
- Harrisia tortuosa
- Hatiora salicornoides (the epithet is also spelt salicornioides)
- Hylocereus costaricensis, synonym of Selenicereus costaricensis, Costa Rica nightblooming cactus
- Jasminocereus thouarsii, candelabra cactus
- Lasiocereus fulvus
- Lasiocereus rupicola
- Leocereus bahiensis
- Lepismium cruciforme
- Lepismium houlletianum
- Lepismium incachacanum
- Lepismium lorentzianum
- Lepismium lumbricoides
- Lepismium warmingianum
- Leptocereus assurgens
- Leptocereus weingartianus
- Leuchtenbergia principis
- Leuenbergeria bleo, syn. Pereskia bleo
- Leuenbergeria guamacho, syn. Pereskia guamacho
- Leuenbergeria lychnidiflora, syn. Pereskia lychnidiflora
- Maihuenia patagonica
- Maihuenia poeppigii
- Maihueniopsis conoidea
- Maihueniopsis darwinii
- Maihueniopsis glomerata
- Maihueniopsis hypogaea
- Maihueniopsis subterranea
- Mammillaria albicans
- Mammillaria albilanata
- Mammillaria barbata, greenflower nipple cactus
- Mammillaria baumii
- Mammillaria beneckei
- Mammillaria bocasana
- Mammillaria brandegeei
- Mammillaria candida (syn. Mammilloydia candida)
- Mammillaria carnea
- Mammillaria cerralboa
- Mammillaria columbiana
- Mammillaria compressa
- Mammillaria crinita
- Mammillaria decipiens
- Mammillaria densispina
- Mammillaria dioica
- Mammillaria discolor
- Mammillaria dixanthocentron
- Mammillaria elongata
- Mammillaria erythrosperma
- Mammillaria evermanniana
- Mammillaria fittkaui
- Mammillaria formosa
- Mammillaria geminispina
- Mammillaria glassii
- Mammillaria grahamii, Graham's pincushion cactus
- Mammillaria grusonii
- Mammillaria guelzowiana
- Mammillaria guerreronis
- Mammillaria haageana
- Mammillaria heyderi, little nipple cactus
- Mammillaria huitzilopochtli
- Mammillaria hutchisoniana
- Mammillaria insularis
- Mammillaria karwinskiana
- Mammillaria klissingiana
- Mammillaria kraehenbuehlii
- Mammillaria lasiacantha, lace-spine nipple cactus
- Mammillaria lenta
- Mammillaria longiflora
- Mammillaria magnimamma
- Mammillaria mainiae, Main's nipple-cactus
- Mammillaria mammillaris
- Mammillaria marksiana
- Mammillaria mazatlanensis
- Mammillaria melanocentra
- Mammillaria mercadensis
- Mammillaria moelleriana
- Mammillaria muehlenpfordtii
- Mammillaria mystax
- Mammillaria nana
- Mammillaria neopalmeri
- Mammillaria nivosa, woolly nipple cactus
- Mammillaria nunezii
- Mammillaria orcuttii
- Mammillaria petterssonii
- Mammillaria phitauiana
- Mammillaria picta
- Mammillaria pilispina
- Mammillaria polyedra
- Mammillaria polythele
- Mammillaria pondii
- Mammillaria poselgeri
- Mammillaria pottsii, Pott's nipple-cactus
- Mammillaria prolifera, West Indian nipple-cactus
- Mammillaria rekoi
- Mammillaria rhodantha
- Mammillaria saboae
- Mammillaria sartorii
- Mammillaria scrippsiana
- Mammillaria sempervivi
- Mammillaria senilis
- Mammillaria sphacelata
- Mammillaria sphaerica, pale mammillaria
- Mammillaria standleyi
- Mammillaria tetrancistra, southwestern prickly-pear
- Mammillaria thornberi, Thornber's fishhook cactus
- Mammillaria tonalensis
- Mammillaria uncinata
- Mammillaria vetula
- Mammillaria weingartiana
- Mammillaria winterae
- Mammillaria wrightii, Wright's prickly-pear
- Mammillaria zephyranthoides
- Matucana aurantiaca
- Matucana formosa
- Matucana haynei
- Melocactus bahiensis
- Melocactus concinnus
- Melocactus curvispinus
- Melocactus ernestii
- Melocactus harlowii
- Melocactus inconcinnus
- Melocactus intortus, mother-in-law's pincushion
- Melocactus levitestatus
- Melocactus macracanthos
- Melocactus mazelianus
- Melocactus neryi
- Melocactus oreas
- Melocactus paucispinus
- Melocactus peruvianus
- Melocactus smithii
- Melocactus zehntneri
- Micranthocereus purpureus
- Miqueliopuntia miquelii
- Myrtillocactus cochal
- Myrtillocactus geometrizans
- Myrtillocactus schenckii
- Neobuxbaumia mezcalaensis
- Neobuxbaumia scoparia
- Neobuxbaumia squamulosa
- Neobuxbaumia tetetzo
- Neolloydia conoidea
- Neoraimondia arequipensis
- Neoraimondia herzogiana
- Neowerdermannia chilensis
- Neowerdermannia vorwerkii
- Nopalea auberi
- Nopalea inaperta
- Opuntia ammophila
- Opuntia anacantha
- Opuntia arechavaletae
- Opuntia assumptionis
- Opuntia atrispina, border prickly-pear
- Opuntia aurantiaca, tiger-pear
- Opuntia aurea, golden prickly-pear
- Opuntia aureispina, golden-spined prickly-pear
- Opuntia austrina
- Opuntia basilaris, beavertail prickly-pear
- Opuntia boldinghii
- Opuntia bravoana
- Opuntia caracassana
- Opuntia chlorotica, dollar-joint prickly-pear
- Opuntia decumbens
- Opuntia depressa
- Opuntia elata
- Opuntia elatior
- Opuntia engelmannii, cactus-apple
- Opuntia excelsa
- Opuntia fragilis, brittle prickly-pear
- Opuntia fuliginosa
- Opuntia galapageia, Galápagos prickly pear
- Opuntia gosseliniana, violet prickly-pear
- Opuntia guatemalensis
- Opuntia huajuapensis
- Opuntia humifusa, eastern prickly-pear
- Opuntia hyptiacantha
- Opuntia lagunae
- Opuntia lasiacantha
- Opuntia lata
- Opuntia leucotricha, arborescent pricklypear
- Opuntia littoralis, coastal prickly-pear
- Opuntia macrocentra, purple prickly-pear
- Opuntia macrorhiza, twistspine pricklypear
- Opuntia megapotamica
- Opuntia microdasys
- Opuntia monacantha, common pricklypear
- Opuntia oricola, chaparral prickly-pear
- Opuntia parviclada
- Opuntia phaeacantha, New Mexico prickly-pear
- Opuntia pilifera
- Opuntia pinkavae, Bulrush Canyon prickly-pear
- Opuntia pollardii
- Opuntia polyacantha, panhandle prickly-pear
- Opuntia pottsii
- Opuntia puberula
- Opuntia pubescens
- Opuntia pusilla, cockspur pricklypear
- Opuntia pycnantha
- Opuntia quimilo
- Opuntia quitensis
- Opuntia repens, roving pricklypear
- Opuntia robusta
- Opuntia rufida, blind pricklypear
- Opuntia salmiana
- Opuntia schickendantzii
- Opuntia soederstromiana
- Opuntia stenopetala
- Opuntia streptacantha
- Opuntia stricta, erect pricklypear
- Opuntia strigil, marble-fruit prickly-pear
- Opuntia sulphurea
- Opuntia tehuacana
- Opuntia tehuantepecana
- Opuntia tomentosa, woollyjoint pricklypear
- Opuntia wilcoxii
- Oreocereus celsianus
- Oreocereus doelzianus
- Oreocereus hempelianus
- Oreocereus leucotrichus
- Oreocereus trollii
- Oroya borchersii
- Pachycereus fulviceps
- Pachycereus hollianus
- Pachycereus pecten-aboriginum
- Pachycereus pringlei
- Pachycereus schottii, senita cactus
- Pachycereus tepamo
- Pachycereus weberi
- Parodia ayopayana
- Parodia carambeiensis
- Parodia chrysacanthion
- Parodia comarapana
- Parodia commutans
- Parodia erinacea
- Parodia formosa
- Parodia gibbulosoides
- Parodia linkii
- Parodia maassii
- Parodia mammulosa
- Parodia microsperma
- Parodia ocampoi
- Parodia otaviana
- Parodia prestoensis
- Parodia ritteri
- Parodia schwebsiana
- Parodia stuemeri
- Parodia subterranea
- Parodia taratensis
- Parodia tuberculata
- Parodia turbinata
- Pediocactus nigrispinus
- Pediocactus peeblesianus, Peebles' Navajo cactus
- Pediocactus sileri, Siler's pincushion cactus
- Pediocactus simpsonii, snowball pediocactus
- Pediocactus winkleri, Winkler's pincushion cactus
- Pelecyphora aselliformis
- Pelecyphora strobiliformis
- Peniocereus greggii, desert night-blooming cereus
- Peniocereus hirschtianus
- Peniocereus johnstonii
- Peniocereus marianus
- Peniocereus serpentinus
- Peniocereus striatus, gearstem cactus
- Peniocereus viperinus
- Pereskia aculeata, Barbados gooseberry
- Pereskia diaz-romeroana
- Pereskia horrida
- Pereskia weberiana
- Pereskiopsis aquosa
- Pereskiopsis blakeana
- Pereskiopsis diguetii
- Pereskiopsis kellermanii
- Pereskiopsis porteri
- Pereskiopsis rotundifolia
- Pfeiffera ianthothele
- Pfeiffera monacantha
- Pfeiffera paranganiensis
- Pierrebraunia brauniorum
- Pilosocereus alensis
- Pilosocereus aurisetus
- Pilosocereus bohlei
- Pilosocereus brasiliensis
- Pilosocereus catingicola
- Pilosocereus chrysacanthus
- Pilosocereus collinsii
- Pilosocereus flavipulvinatus
- Pilosocereus floccosus
- Pilosocereus gaumeri
- Pilosocereus glaucochrous
- Pilosocereus gounellei
- Pilosocereus jauruensis
- Pilosocereus lanuginosus
- Pilosocereus leucocephalus
- Pilosocereus machrisii
- Pilosocereus pachycladus
- Pilosocereus pentaedrophorus
- Pilosocereus piauhyensis
- Pilosocereus polygonus, Key tree cactus
- Pilosocereus purpusii
- Pilosocereus pusillibaccatus
- Pilosocereus royenii, Royen's tree cactus – synonym of Pilosocereus polygonus
- Pilosocereus tuberculatus
- Pilosocereus vilaboensis
- Polaskia chende
- Polaskia chichipe
- Praecereus euchlorus
- Praecereus saxicola
- Pseudorhipsalis amazonica
- Pseudorhipsalis ramulosa, syn. Kimnachia ramulosa
- Pterocactus araucanus
- Pterocactus australis
- Pterocactus fischeri
- Pterocactus gonjianii
- Pterocactus hickenii
- Pterocactus megliolii
- Pterocactus reticulatus
- Pterocactus tuberosus
- Pterocactus valentinii
- Quiabentia verticillata
- Quiabentia zehntneri
- Rauhocereus riosaniensis
- Rebutia breviflora
- Rebutia canigueralii
- Rebutia cardenasiana
- Rebutia cintia
- Rebutia cylindrica
- Rebutia deminuta
- Rebutia einsteinii
- Rebutia fabrisii
- Rebutia fidana
- Rebutia fiebrigii
- Rebutia heliosa
- Rebutia mentosa
- Rebutia minuscula
- Rebutia neocumingii
- Rebutia oligacantha
- Rebutia padcayensis
- Rebutia pulchra
- Rebutia pygmaea
- Rebutia ritteri
- Rebutia steinbachii
- Rebutia steinmannii
- Rebutia tarijensis
- Rhipsalis baccifera, mistletoe cactus
- Rhipsalis burchellii
- Rhipsalis campos-portoana
- Rhipsalis cereuscula
- Rhipsalis cuneata
- Rhipsalis elliptica
- Rhipsalis floccosa
- Rhipsalis grandiflora
- Rhipsalis juengeri
- Rhipsalis lindbergiana
- Rhipsalis micrantha
- Rhipsalis neves-armondii
- Rhipsalis occidentalis
- Rhipsalis pachyptera
- Rhipsalis paradoxa
- Rhipsalis pulchra
- Rhipsalis puniceodiscus
- Rhipsalis teres
- Rhipsalis trigona
- Rhodocactus bahiensis, syn. Pereskia bahiensis
- Rhodocactus grandifolius, syn. Pereskia grandifolia; rose cactus
- Rhodocactus nemorosus, syn. Pereskia nemorosa
- Rhodocactus sacharosa, syn. Pereskia sacharosa
- Rhodocactus stenanthus, syn. Pereskia stenantha
- Samaipaticereus corroanus
- Selenicereus guatemalensis (syn. Hylocereus guatemalensis)
- Selenicereus megalanthus (syn. Hylocereus megalanthus)
- Selenicereus monacanthus (syn. Hylocereus monacanthus)
- Selenicereus ocamponis (syn. Hylocereus ocamponis)
- Selenicereus setaceus (syn. Hylocereus setaceus)
- Selenicereus spinulosus
- Selenicereus triangularis (syn. Hylocereus triangularis)
- Sclerocactus brevihamatus, Engelmann's fishhook cactus
- Sclerocactus erectocentrus, red-spine butterfly-cactus
- Sclerocactus glaucus, Colorado hookless cactus
- Sclerocactus intertextus, white fishhook cactus
- Sclerocactus johnsonii, eight-spine fishhook cactus
- Sclerocactus mariposensis, Lloyd's mariposa cactus
- Sclerocactus mesae-verdae, Mesa Verde cactus
- Sclerocactus papyracanthus, grama grass cactus
- Sclerocactus parviflorus, small-flower fishhook cactus
- Sclerocactus polyancistrus, Mohave fishhook cactus
- Sclerocactus pubispinus, Great Basin fishhook cactus
- Sclerocactus scheeri, Scheer's fish-hook cactus
- Sclerocactus spinosior, Desert Valley fishhook cactus
- Sclerocactus uncinatus, Chihuahuan fish-hook cactus
- Sclerocactus unguispinus
- Sclerocactus warnockii, Warnock's fishhook cactus
- Sclerocactus wetlandicus, Uinta Basin hookless cactus
- Sclerocactus whipplei, Whipple's fishhook cactus
- Selenicereus anthonyanus
- Selenicereus grandiflorus
- Selenicereus hamatus
- Selenicereus inermis
- Selenicereus spinulosus, vinelike moonlight cactus
- Selenicereus vagans
- Selenicereus validus
- Siccobaccatus estevesii
- Stenocactus coptonogonus
- Stenocereus aragonii
- Stenocereus dumortieri
- Stenocereus eruca
- Stenocereus fimbriatus
- Stenocereus fricii
- Stenocereus griseus
- Stenocereus gummosus
- Stenocereus kerberi
- Stenocereus montanus
- Stenocereus pruinosus
- Stenocereus queretaroensis
- Stenocereus quevedonis
- Stenocereus standleyi
- Stenocereus stellatus
- Stenocereus thurberi, organ pipe cactus
- Stenocereus treleasei
- Stephanocereus leucostele
- Stephanocereus luetzelburgii
- Stetsonia coryne
- Strophocactus testudo
- Strophocactus wittii
- Tacinga funalis
- Tacinga inamoena
- Tacinga palmadora
- Tacinga saxatilis
- Tacinga werneri
- Tephrocactus alexanderi
- Tephrocactus aoracanthus
- Tephrocactus articulatus
- Tephrocactus molinensis
- Tephrocactus nigrispinus
- Tephrocactus weberi
- Thelocactus bicolor, straw thelocactus
- Thelocactus buekii
- Thelocactus conothelos
- Thelocactus hexaedrophorus
- Thelocactus leucacanthus
- Thelocactus multicephalus
- Thelocactus rinconensis
- Thelocactus setispinus, miniature barrel cactus
- Thelocactus tulensis
- Tunilla corrugata
- Tunilla soehrensii
- Tunilla tilcarensis
- Turbinicarpus beguinii
- Turbinicarpus pseudopectinatus
- Turbinicarpus viereckii
- Weberbauerocereus albus
- Weberbauerocereus churinensis
- Weberbauerocereus cuzcoensis
- Weberbauerocereus rauhii
- Weberbauerocereus weberbaueri
- Weberbauerocereus winterianus
- Weberocereus glaber
- Weberocereus tunilla
- Yungasocereus inquisivensis, syn. Cleistocactus inquisivensis

==== Caryophyllaceae ====
- Cerastium arvense
- Cerastium szowitsii, Szowitz's chickweed
- Dianthus bicolor, bicolour pink
- Dianthus marizii
- Dianthus raddeanus, Radde's pink
- Dianthus schemachensis, Shemakhian pink
- Gypsophila capitata, capitate chalk plant
- Haya obovata
- Herniaria maritima
- Polycarpaea balfourii
- Polycarpaea caespitosa
- Polycarpaea hayoides
- Polycarpaea spicata
- Silene longicilia
- Silene vulgaris, bladder campion
- Spergularia bocconei, Boccone's sandspurry
- Spergularia marina, lesser sea-spurrey
- Spergularia media
- Spergularia tangerina
- Stellaria calycantha
- Stellaria humifusa
- Stellaria recurvata

==== Chenopodiaceae ====
- Axyris caucasica, Caucasian axyris
- Chenopodium rubrum
- Salicornia rubra
- Sarcobatus vermiculatus
- Suaeda salina

==== Didiereaceae ====
- Alluaudia procera
- Alluaudiopsis marnieriana
- Didierea madagascariensis
- Portulacaria afra
- Portulacaria carrissoana
- Portulacaria namaquensis

==== Droseraceae ====
- Drosera burmanni
- Drosera filiformis
- Drosera indica, Indian sundew
- Drosera linearis
- Drosera peltata
- Drosera rotundifolia, common sundew

==== Molluginaceae ====
Species

- Corrigiola litoralis, strapwort
- Corrigiola telephiifolia
- Mollugo flavescens
- Suessenguthiella caespitosa

Subspecies

- Mollugo flavescens subsp. gracillima

==== Nepenthaceae ====
- Nepenthes alata
- Nepenthes alba
- Nepenthes ampullaria
- Nepenthes armin
- Nepenthes eustachya
- Nepenthes gracilis
- Nepenthes gymnamphora
- Nepenthes lamii
- Nepenthes leonardoi
- Nepenthes mantalingajanensis
- Nepenthes maxima
- Nepenthes mirabilis
- Nepenthes monticola
- Nepenthes muluensis
- Nepenthes neoguineensis
- Nepenthes nigra
- Nepenthes papuana
- Nepenthes pectinata
- Nepenthes philippinensis
- Nepenthes rafflesiana
- Nepenthes reinwardtiana
- Nepenthes rowaniae
- Nepenthes stenophylla
- Nepenthes tenax
- Nepenthes tentaculata
- Nepenthes tobaica
- Nepenthes treubiana
- Nepenthes vieillardii

==== Nyctaginaceae ====
- Ceodes taitensis
- Ceodes umbellifera
- Commicarpus heimerlii
- Commicarpus simonyi
- Guapira myrtiflora
- Pisonia floribunda, Galapagos pisonia

==== Polygonaceae ====
- Coccoloba diversifolia
- Coccoloba uvifera
- Koenigia islandica
- Persicaria amphibia, amphibious bistort
- Persicaria arifolia
- Persicaria attenuata, smart weed
- Persicaria barbata
- Persicaria dichotoma
- Persicaria glabrum
- Persicaria hydropiper, water-pepper
- Persicaria hydropiperoides
- Persicaria lapathifolia
- Persicaria maculosa
- Persicaria punctata
- Persicaria robustior
- Persicaria sagittata
- Persicaria salicifolia
- Persicaria senegalensis
- Persicaria strigosa
- Polygonum argyrocoleon
- Polygonum plebeium
- Polygonum pubescens
- Polygonum romanum
- Rumex britannica
- Rumex hydrolapathum, water dock
- Rumex occidentalis
- Rumex palustris, marsh dock
- Rumex tolimensis

==== Portulacaceae ====
- Montia chamissoi
- Montia fontana, blinks
- Montia parvifolia
- Portulaca howellii, Galapagos purslane
- Talinum portulacifolium

==== Other Caryophyllales species ====
- Asteropeia amblyocarpa
- Asteropeia multiflora
- Asteropeia rhopaloides

=== Celastrales ===
There are 22 species, one subspecies, and one variety in the order Celastrales assessed as least concern.

==== Celastraceae ====
Species

- Bhesa paniculata
- Bhesa robusta
- Catha edulis, khat
- Crossopetalum caymanense
- Crossopetalum parvifolium
- Elaeodendron aquifolium
- Elaeodendron croceum
- Elaeodendron cunninghamii
- Elaeodendron fruticosum
- Elaeodendron glaucum
- Elaeodendron humbertii
- Elaeodendron matabelicum
- Elaeodendron schweinfurthianum
- Elaeodendron viburnifolium
- Elaeodendron vitiense
- Euonymus carnosus
- Euonymus cochinchinensis
- Euonymus europaeus
- Euonymus frigidus
- Euonymus grandiflorus
- Euonymus indicus
- Euonymus koopmannii
- Euonymus latifolius
- Euonymus laxiflorus
- Euonymus myrianthus
- Euonymus sanguineus
- Euonymus verrucosus
- Gyminda latifolia
- Lophopetalum javanicum
- Lophopetalum pallidum
- Lophopetalum wightianum
- Maytenus umbellata
- Microtropis platyphylla
- Microtropis sumatrana
- Microtropis valida
- Parnassia fimbriata
- Parnassia glauca
- Parnassia kotzebuei
- Parnassia palustris, grass-of-Parnassus
- Schaefferia frutescens
- Siphonodon celastrineus

Subspecies

- Euonymus latifolius subsp. cauconis

Varieties

- Maytenus mossambicensis var. gurueensis

==== Other Celastrales species ====
- Azima sarmentosa
- Dichapetalum barbosae
- Tapura tchoutoi

=== Cornales ===
Species

- Alangium griffithi, synonym of Alangium griffithii
- Alangium javanicum
- Alangium nobile
- Cornus amomum
- Cornus sericea
- Mastixia arborea
- Melanophylla alnifolia
- Melanophylla crenata

Varieties

- Mastixia trichotoma var. maingayi

=== Crossosomatales ===
- Dalrympelea nitida

=== Cucurbitales ===
- Anisophyllea beccariana
- Anisophyllea corneri
- Anisophyllea disticha
- Anisophyllea griffithii
- Begonia socotrana
- Cionosicys pomiformis, duppy gourd
- Cucumella clavipetiolata
- Cucurbita foetidissima
- Octomeles sumatrana
- Tetrameles nudiflora

=== Dilleniales ===
- Curatella americana
- Dillenia reticulata
- Hibbertia baudouinii
- Hibbertia lanceolata
- Hibbertia pancheri
- Hibbertia patula
- Hibbertia podocarpifolia
- Hibbertia pulchella
- Hibbertia trachyphylla
- Hibbertia wagapii
- Paeonia officinalis, common peony
- Tetracera billardierei

=== Dipsacales ===
- Lonicera caerulea
- Lonicera oblongifolia
- Valeriana alypifolia
- Valeriana aretioides
- Valeriana dioica
- Valeriana tuberosa, tuberous valerian
- Valeriana uliginosa
- Viburnum tinus
- Zabelia corymbosa

=== Ericales ===
==== Actinidiaceae ====
- Saurauia aequatoriensis
- Saurauia crassisepala
- Saurauia herthae
- Saurauia pentapetala
- Saurauia pseudostrigillosa
- Saurauia pustulata
- Saurauia scabrida

==== Clethraceae ====
- Clethra arborea

==== Cyrillaceae ====
- Cyrilla racemiflora

==== Ebenaceae ====
- Diospyros adenophora
- Diospyros apiculata
- Diospyros areolata
- Diospyros argentea
- Diospyros artanthifolia
- Diospyros australis
- Diospyros bibracteata
- Diospyros buxifolia
- Diospyros curranii
- Diospyros decandra
- Diospyros dichrophylla
- Diospyros diepenhorstii
- Diospyros ekodul
- Diospyros eriantha
- Diospyros fasciculosa
- Diospyros foxworthyi
- Diospyros frutescens
- Diospyros glabra
- Diospyros humilis
- Diospyros ismailii
- Diospyros latisepala
- Diospyros lotus, date-plum
- Diospyros lycioides
- Diospyros macrophylla
- Diospyros mespiliformis
- Diospyros montana
- Diospyros nigra
- Diospyros nutans
- Diospyros oleifera
- Diospyros penangiana
- Diospyros pendula
- Diospyros pentamera
- Diospyros ridleyi
- Diospyros rufa
- Diospyros scortechinii
- Diospyros singaporensis
- Diospyros transitoria
- Diospyros trengganuensis
- Diospyros tristis
- Diospyros whyteana
- Diospyros yomomo

==== Ericaceae ====
Species

- Andromeda polifolia
- Arbutus unedo
- Chamaedaphne calyculata
- Craibiodendron stellatum
- Erica cinerea, bell heather
- Erica rossii
- Gaultheria hispidula
- Gaylussacia bigeloviana
- Kalmia microphylla
- Kalmia polifolia
- Ledum palustre
- Rhododendron arboreum
- Rhododendron ferrugineum, alpine rose
- Rhododendron hirsutum, hairy alpenrose
- Rhododendron wrayi
- Vaccinium macrocarpon
- Vaccinium oxycoccos
- Vaccinium vitis-idaea, lingonberry

Varieties

- Agarista mexicana var. pinetorum
- Comarostaphylis discolor var. discolor

==== Lecythidaceae ====
- Asteranthos brasiliensis
- Barringtonia acutangula
- Barringtonia asiatica
- Barringtonia conoidea
- Barringtonia macrostachya
- Barringtonia reticulata
- Couratari guianensis
- Couroupita guianensis, cannonball tree
- Eschweilera integrifolia
- Eschweilera pittieri
- Lecythis ollaria

==== Pentaphylacaceae ====
- Cleyera japonica

==== Polemoniaceae ====
- Cantua buxifolia

==== Primulaceae ====
Species

- Aegiceras corniculatum
- Anagallis serpens
- Androsace cylindrica
- Androsace pyrenaica
- Ardisia costaricensis
- Ardisia escallonioides
- Ardisia pulverulenta, blossomberry grape
- Ardisia rigidifolia
- Ardisia standleyana
- Cyclamen purpurascens
- Hottonia palustris
- Lysimachia ciliata
- Lysimachia dubia
- Lysimachia hybrida
- Lysimachia maritima
- Lysimachia nummularia, creeping-jenny
- Lysimachia punctata
- Lysimachia terrestris
- Lysimachia thyrsiflora, tufted loosestrife
- Lysimachia vulgaris, yellow loosestrife
- Myrsine collina
- Myrsine fasciculata
- Myrsine niauensis
- Myrsine nukuhivensis
- Myrsine rapensis
- Primula auriculata
- Primula carniolica
- Primula cuneifolia
- Primula egaliksensis, Greenland primrose
- Primula glaucescens
- Primula incana
- Primula mistassinica
- Primula spectabilis
- Primula stricta
- Rapanea allenii
- Samolus porosus
- Samolus valerandi, brookweed
- Trientalis borealis

Varieties

- Myrsine grantii var. grantii
- Myrsine ovalis var. wilderi

==== Sapotaceae ====
Species

- Aulandra longifolia, synonym of Palaquium longifolium
- Chromolucuma baehniana
- Chromolucuma rubriflora
- Chrysophyllum argenteum
- Chrysophyllum cainito
- Chrysophyllum manaosense
- Chrysophyllum oliviforme
- Chrysophyllum paranaense
- Chrysophyllum pomiferum
- Chrysophyllum scalare
- Chrysophyllum venezuelanense, synonym of Cornuella venezuelanensis
- Diploknema sebifera
- Donella lanceolata
- Ecclinusa bullata
- Ecclinusa ulei
- Isonandra lanceolata
- Madhuca burckiana
- Madhuca malaccensis
- Madhuca mindanaensis
- Manilkara bidentata
- Manilkara jaimiqui
- Manilkara zapota
- Micropholis cayennensis
- Micropholis sanctae-rosae
- Mimusops coriacea
- Palaquium beccarianum
- Palaquium calophyllum
- Palaquium cochleariifolium
- Palaquium dasyphyllum
- Palaquium decurrens
- Palaquium ridleyi
- Palaquium rivulare
- Palaquium sericeum
- Payena maingayi
- Pichonia balansana
- Pouteria cayennensis
- Pouteria franciscana
- Pouteria melanopoda
- Pouteria orinocoensis
- Pouteria sagotiana
- Pouteria sapota
- Pouteria scrobiculata
- Pouteria tenuisepala
- Pouteria trigonosperma
- Pouteria virescens
- Pradosia grisebachii
- Pradosia verticillata
- Sideroxylon salicifolium
- Vitellariopsis dispar

Subspecies

- Pouteria reticulata subsp. surinamensis
- Sarcaulus brasiliensis subsp. gracilis

==== Sarraceniaceae ====
Species

- Darlingtonia californica, California pitcher plant
- Sarracenia flava
- Sarracenia minor, hooded pitcherplant
- Sarracenia psittacina

Subspecies

- Sarracenia purpurea subsp. purpurea
- Sarracenia purpurea subsp. venosa

==== Styracaceae ====
- Alniphyllum eberhardtii

==== Symplocaceae ====
- Symplocos anomala
- Symplocos buxifolia
- Symplocos celastrifolia
- Symplocos cerasifolia
- Symplocos deflexa
- Symplocos laeteviridis
- Symplocos ophirensis
- Symplocos pendula
- Symplocos zizyphoides

==== Theaceae ====
- Camellia anlungensis
- Camellia brevistyla
- Camellia caudata
- Camellia confusa
- Camellia cordifolia
- Camellia costei
- Camellia crassicolumna
- Camellia cuspidata
- Camellia edithae
- Camellia euryoides
- Camellia fluviatilis
- Camellia forrestii
- Camellia fraterna
- Camellia furfuracea
- Camellia gymnogyna
- Camellia japonica
- Camellia kissii, Nepal camellia
- Camellia lanceolata
- Camellia lawii
- Camellia lutchuensis
- Camellia mairei
- Camellia oleifera
- Camellia pitardii
- Camellia polyodonta
- Camellia rhytidocarpa
- Camellia rosthorniana
- Camellia salicifolia
- Camellia saluenensis
- Camellia sasanqua
- Camellia semiserrata
- Camellia synaptica
- Camellia taliensis
- Camellia tsaii
- Camellia tsingpienensis
- Camellia yunnanensis
- Eurya rapensis
- Gordonia lasianthus, loblolly bay
- Stewartia malacodendron, silky camellia
- Stewartia ovata, mountain camellia

==== Other Ericales species ====
- Rhaptopetalum beguei
- Ternstroemia wallichiana

=== Fabales ===
Species

- Abarema cochliocarpos
- Abarema commutata
- Abarema curvicarpa
- Abrus schimperi
- Acacia amazonica
- Acacia aneura, mulga
- Acacia auriculiformis, ear-leaf acacia
- Acacia basedowii, Basedow's wattle
- Acacia bussei
- Acacia caesia
- Acacia chiapensis
- Acacia crassiuscula
- Acacia dempsteri
- Acacia ehrenbergiana, salam
- Acacia eremophila
- Acacia excelsa, bunkerman
- Acacia furcatispina
- Acacia gilliesii
- Acacia glaucocarpa
- Acacia hecatophylla, long pod
- Acacia hilliana, Hill's tabletop wattle
- Acacia hydaspica
- Acacia jennerae, coonavittra wattle
- Acacia koa, koa
- Acacia leucospira
- Acacia maidenii
- Acacia montana, mallee wattle
- Acacia pendula, weeping myall
- Acacia permixta, hairy acacia
- Acacia petraea, lancewood
- Acacia piauhiensis
- Acacia pluricapitata
- Acacia pycnantha
- Acacia richii
- Acacia riparia
- Acacia semirigida, Stony Ridge wattle
- Acacia sericata
- Acacia torrei
- Acacia visco
- Adenanthera pavonina
- Adenocarpus viscosus
- Adenodolichos kaessneri
- Adenolobus pechuelii
- Adesmia aegiceras
- Adesmia microphylla
- Adesmia muricata
- Adesmia papposa
- Adesmia pungens
- Adesmia trifoliolata
- Adesmia trijuga
- Aeschynomene aspera, sola pith plant
- Aeschynomene brasiliana, Brazilian jointtvetch
- Aeschynomene brevipes
- Aeschynomene gracilis, Puerto Rico jointvetch
- Aeschynomene indica, Indian jointvetch
- Aeschynomene kerstingii
- Aeschynomene marginata
- Aeschynomene multicaulis
- Aeschynomene racemosa
- Aeschynomene tambacoundensis
- Albizia adianthifolia, flat-crown albizia
- Albizia amara
- Albizia bernieri
- Albizia decandra
- Albizia glabripetala
- Albizia pistaciifolia
- Albizia tulearensis
- Alexa wachenheimii
- Alysicarpus bupleurifolius
- Alysicarpus naikianus
- Amorpha californica, California indigobush
- Anadenanthera peregrina
- Anarthrophyllum rigidum
- Andira fraxinifolia
- Andira inermis
- Angylocalyx boutiqueanus
- Anthonotha ferruginea
- Aotus subglauca, wild wallflower
- Apuleia leiocarpa
- Arachis cardenasii
- Archidendron bubalinum
- Archidendron ellipticum
- Archidendron jiringa
- Argyrolobium collinum
- Argyrolobium sericosemium
- Argyrolobium vaginiferum
- Aspalathus bracteata
- Aspalathus cinerascens
- Aspalathus microphylla
- Aspalathus salicifolia
- Aspalathus serpens
- Aspalathus tenuissima
- Aspalathus triquetra
- Aspalathus ulicina
- Astragalus acaulis
- Astragalus albispinus
- Astragalus ammodendron
- Astragalus arenarius, arenarious milk-vetch
- Astragalus aucheri
- Astragalus balfourianus
- Astragalus bourgaeanus
- Astragalus calycosus, King's milkvetch
- Astragalus cephalotes
- Astragalus cobrensis, copper mine milkvetch
- Astragalus coltonii, Colton's milkvetch
- Astragalus commixtus
- Astragalus confusus
- Astragalus cottamii, Cottam's milkvetch
- Astragalus crassicarpus, groundplum milkvetch
- Astragalus crenatus
- Astragalus crotalariae, salton milkvetch
- Astragalus denudatus
- Astragalus didymocarpus, dwarf white milkvetch
- Astragalus ensiformis, pagumpa milkvetch
- Astragalus ervoides
- Astragalus flexuosus, flexible milkvetch
- Astragalus floccosus
- Astragalus froedinii
- Astragalus geminiflorus
- Astragalus geyeri, Geyer's milkvetch
- Astragalus kabristanicus, Kabristanian milk vetch
- Astragalus kahiricus
- Astragalus kolymensis
- Astragalus koslovii
- Astragalus lentiginosus, freckled milkvetch
- Astragalus leontinus
- Astragalus miser, timber milkvetch
- Astragalus mollissimus, woolly locoweed
- Astragalus molybdenus, Leadville milkvetch
- Astragalus mongholicus
- Astragalus myriacanthus
- Astragalus nuttallianus, smallflowered milkvetch
- Astragalus oophorus, egg milkvetch
- Astragalus pachypus, thick-pod milkvetch
- Astragalus pehuenches
- Astragalus piutensis, Sevier milkvetch
- Astragalus polycladus
- Astragalus pubentissimus, green river milkvetch
- Astragalus sesameus
- Astragalus sogdianus
- Astragalus sparsiflorus, Front Range milkvetch
- Astragalus stevenianus
- Astragalus submaculatus
- Astragalus terminalis, railhead milkvetch
- Astragalus tribuloides
- Astragalus urgutinus
- Astragalus whitneyi, balloonpod milkvetch
- Astragalus williamsii, Williams' milkvetch
- Astragalus wolgensis
- Badiera propinqua
- Baphia buettneri
- Baphia eriocalyx
- Baphia nitida, camwood
- Baptisia sphaerocarpa, round wild indigo
- Bauhinia acuminata
- Bauhinia beguinotii
- Bauhinia cunninghamii, bean tree
- Bauhinia cupreonitens
- Bauhinia excelsa
- Bauhinia finlaysoniana
- Bauhinia forficata, orchid tree
- Bauhinia glauca
- Bauhinia harmsiana
- Bauhinia hymenaeifolia
- Bauhinia kockiana
- Bauhinia ornata
- Bauhinia picta
- Bauhinia pottsii
- Bauhinia purpurea, phanera purpurea
- Bauhinia rufa
- Bauhinia seleriana
- Bauhinia stipularis
- Bauhinia variegata, phanera variegata
- Bauhinia wallichii
- Behaimia cubensis
- Bergeronia sericea
- Berlinia coriacea
- Berlinia grandiflora
- Biancaea sappan
- Bobgunnia fistuloides
- Bocoa prouacensis
- Bossiaea pulchella
- Brachystegia cynometroides
- Brachystegia laurentii
- Brachystegia puberula
- Brandzeia filicifolia
- Brenierea insignis
- Brongniartia lupinoides
- Brongniartia mortonii
- Bussea massaiensis
- Caesalpinia hildebrandtii
- Caesalpinia laxiflora
- Caesalpinia merxmuelleriana
- Cajanus scarabaeoides
- Calliandra hirsuta
- Calliandra laxa
- Calliandra macrocalyx
- Calophaca wolgarica
- Camoensia brevicalyx
- Campylotropis trigonoclada
- Canavalia hirsutissima
- Canavalia macrobotrys
- Canavalia sericea, silky jackbean
- Caragana franchetiana
- Caragana opulens
- Caragana zahlbruckneri, pea shrub
- Cassia fistula
- Centrosema arenarium
- Centrosema macrocarpum
- Ceratonia siliqua, carob
- Cercis canadensis
- Cercis chinensis, Chinese redbud
- Cercis racemosa
- Chaetocalyx scandens
- Chamaecrista absus, tropical sensitive pea
- Chamaecrista apoucouita
- Chamaecrista ciliolata
- Chamaecrista cotinifolia
- Chamaecrista cytisoides
- Chamaecrista desvauxii
- Chamaecrista ensiformis
- Chamaecrista fenarolii
- Chamaecrista glandulosa
- Chamaecrista jaegeri
- Chamaecrista lineata
- Chamaecrista newtonii
- Chamaecrista nictitans, partridge-pea
- Chamaecrista pedicellaris
- Chamaecrista pratensis
- Chamaecrista rigidifolia
- Chamaecrista robynsiana
- Chamaecrista rufa
- Chamaecrista setosa
- Chamaecrista trachycarpa
- Chamaecrista viscosa
- Chloroleucon mangense
- Christia vespertilionis
- Cicer echinospermum
- Cicer oxyodon
- Clathrotropis glaucophylla
- Clitoria glaberrima
- Clitoria hanceana
- Clitoria kaessneri
- Clitoria polystachya
- Clitoria sagotii
- Cojoba rufescens
- Colvillea racemosa, Colville's glory
- Copaifera langsdorffii
- Coronilla valentina, Mediterranean crown vetch
- Craibia grandiflora
- Crotalaria albida
- Crotalaria assamica
- Crotalaria bamendae
- Crotalaria bemba
- Crotalaria capuronii
- Crotalaria chrysochlora
- Crotalaria cobalticola
- Crotalaria cunninghamii, birdflower rattlepod
- Crotalaria distantiflora
- Crotalaria doidgeae
- Crotalaria emarginata
- Crotalaria eremaea, bluebush pea
- Crotalaria fysonii
- Crotalaria griseofusca
- Crotalaria heidmannii
- Crotalaria kipandensis
- Crotalaria laburnoides
- Crotalaria mahafalensis
- Crotalaria melanocarpa
- Crotalaria mendesii
- Crotalaria micans
- Crotalaria microthamnus
- Crotalaria mildbraedii
- Crotalaria montana
- Crotalaria mortonii
- Crotalaria morumbensis
- Crotalaria nitens
- Crotalaria nuda
- Crotalaria paniculata
- Crotalaria pumila, low rattlebox
- Crotalaria quinquefolia
- Crotalaria rotundifolia, prostrate rattlebox
- Crotalaria rufocaulis
- Crotalaria scabrella
- Crotalaria somalensis
- Crotalaria strigulosa
- Crotalaria teretifolia
- Crotalaria uncinella
- Cullen americanum
- Cullen badocanum
- Cynometra commersoniana
- Cynometra hankei
- Cynometra insularis
- Cynometra iripa
- Cynometra marginata
- Cytisus cantabricus
- Cytisus jankae
- Cytisus striatus
- Dalbergia arbutifolia
- Dalbergia assamica
- Dalbergia calycina
- Dalbergia cana
- Dalbergia ecastaphyllum
- Dalbergia elegans
- Dalbergia frutescens
- Dalbergia hancei
- Dalbergia hupeana
- Dalbergia junghuhnii
- Dalbergia louisii
- Dalbergia miscolobium
- Dalbergia monetaria
- Dalbergia oligophylla
- Dalbergia ovata
- Dalbergia parviflora
- Dalbergia peltieri
- Dalbergia reniformis
- Dalbergia rimosa
- Dalbergia sissoo
- Dalbergia trichocarpa
- Dalea ayavacensis
- Dalea bicolor, silver prairie-clover
- Dalea compacta, compact prairie-clover
- Dalea elegans
- Dalea formosa, feather-plume dalea
- Dalea lasiathera, purple prairie-clover
- Dalea melantha
- Dalea obovata, pussyfoot
- Dalea obovatifolia
- Dalea ornata, Blue Mountain prairie-clover
- Dalea scandens
- Daviesia croniniana
- Daviesia gracilis
- Daviesia nudiflora
- Daviesia physodes, prickly bitter pea
- Daviesia squarrosa
- Decorsea dinteri
- Deguelia scandens
- Delonix boiviniana
- Delonix brachycarpa
- Delonix elata, white gul mohur
- Delonix floribunda
- Delonix regia, flame tree
- Derris acuminata
- Derris koolgibberah, poison rope
- Derris maingayana
- Desmanthus pumilus
- Desmodium adscendens
- Desmodium amethystinum
- Desmodium barbatum
- Desmodium elegans
- Desmodium glutinosum, large tick-trefoil
- Desmodium grahamii, Graham's tick-trefoil
- Desmodium intortum
- Desmodium lindheimeri, Lindheimer's tick-trefoil
- Desmodium metallicum
- Desmodium microphyllum
- Desmodium nuttallii
- Desmodium salicifolium
- Desmodium vargasianum
- Detarium microcarpum, sweet dattock
- Dialium guineense
- Dichrostachys arborescens
- Dichrostachys cinerea, sicklebush
- Dichrostachys spicata, Chinese lantern
- Dillwynia juniperina, prickly parrot pea
- Dioclea fimbriata
- Dioclea guianensis
- Dioclea sericea
- Diphysa carthagenensis
- Diphysa occidentalis
- Diplotropis triloba
- Disynstemon paullinioides
- Dolichos elatus
- Dolichos schweinfurthii
- Dolichos trinervatus
- Droogmansia pteropus
- Dumasia villosa
- Dunbaria fusca
- Ebenopsis ebano, ebony blackbead
- Echinospartum boissieri
- Enterolobium cyclocarpum
- Enterolobium schomburgkii, synonym of Robrichia schomburgkii
- Eriosema crinitum, sand pea
- Eriosema englerianum, blue bush
- Eriosema harmsiana
- Eriosema longicalyx
- Eriosema raynaliorum
- Erythrina burana
- Erythrina madagascariensis
- Erythrina senegalensis
- Erythrina variegata, Indian coral tree
- Erythrophleum suaveolens
- Etaballia dubia
- Eurypetalum tessmannii
- Eysenhardtia polystachya, kidneywood
- Flemingia involucrata
- Fordia albiflora
- Gagnebina commersoniana
- Galactia glaucescens
- Galactia tenuiflora
- Gastrolobium brevipes
- Gastrolobium spinosum, prickly poison
- Geissaspis cristata
- Geissaspis tenella
- Genista fasselata
- Genista ferox
- Genista maderensis
- Genista pseudopilosa
- Genista sagittalis
- Genista tenera, Madeira broom
- Genista tridentata
- Geoffroea decorticans
- Gilletiodendron mildbraedii
- Gleditsia microphylla
- Gliricidia sepium
- Glycine canescens, silky glycine
- Glycine latifolia
- Glycyrrhiza lepidota
- Gompholobium glabratum, dainty wedge pea
- Gompholobium obcordatum
- Gompholobium polyzygum
- Gompholobium subulatum
- Gompholobium viscidulum
- Guibourtia ehie, black hyedua
- Gymnocladus chinensis
- Haematoxylum campechianum
- Harpalyce arborescens
- Hedysarum alpinum
- Hedysarum falconeri
- Hedysarum fruticosum, shrubby sweetvetch
- Hedysarum polybotrys
- Hippocrepis comosa, horseshoe-vetch
- Hippocrepis monticola
- Hippocrepis valentina
- Hovea ramulosa
- Hybosema ehrenbergii
- Hymenaea courbaril
- Hymenaea oblongifolia
- Hymenaea parvifolia
- Indigastrum guerranum
- Indigofera angustata
- Indigofera asperifolia
- Indigofera baumiana
- Indigofera bojeri
- Indigofera brevidens, desert indigo
- Indigofera breviviscosa
- Indigofera bungeana
- Indigofera caudata
- Indigofera charlierana
- Indigofera compressa
- Indigofera conjugata
- Indigofera daleoides
- Indigofera depauperata
- Indigofera elliotii
- Indigofera exilis, slender indigo
- Indigofera filicaulis
- Indigofera filifolia
- Indigofera filiformis
- Indigofera galegoides
- Indigofera hochstetteri
- Indigofera hofmanniana
- Indigofera intricata
- Indigofera ionii
- Indigofera kerstingii
- Indigofera leucoclada
- Indigofera linifolia
- Indigofera marmorata
- Indigofera melanadenia
- Indigofera miniata, coastal indigo
- Indigofera monophylla
- Indigofera nephrocarpoides
- Indigofera oblongifolia
- Indigofera paracapitata
- Indigofera polysphaera
- Indigofera procumbens
- Indigofera roseo-caerulea
- Indigofera schliebenii
- Indigofera sessiliflora
- Indigofera taborensis
- Indigofera trita
- Indigofera venusta
- Inga auristellae
- Inga brachystachys
- Inga densiflora
- Inga jinicuil
- Inga laurina
- Inga lomatophylla
- Inga macrophylla
- Inga marginata
- Inga megaphylla
- Inga micheliana
- Inga multinervis
- Inga polita
- Inga psittacorum
- Inga punctata
- Inga sapindoides
- Inga stipularis
- Inga striata
- Inocarpus fagifer
- Isoberlinia doka
- Isotropis cuneifolia, granny bonnets
- Jacksonia cupulifera
- Jacksonia furcellata, grey stinkwood
- Keyserlingia mollis
- Kingiodendron platycarpum
- Koompassia malaccensis
- Kotschya recurvifolia
- Labichea rupestris
- Lackeya multiflora, Boykin's clusterpea
- Lathyrus cirrhosus, cirrhose vetch
- Lathyrus grandiflorus, everlasting-pea
- Lathyrus heterophyllus, Norfolk everlasting-pea
- Lathyrus hirsutus, caley pea
- Lathyrus multiceps
- Lathyrus pallescens
- Lathyrus palustris, marsh pea
- Lathyrus rotundifolius, round-leaf vetchling
- Lathyrus sphaericus
- Lebeckia dinteri
- Leobordea adpressa
- Leobordea anthyllopsis
- Leobordea mirabilis
- Leonardoxa africana
- Leptoderris brachyptera
- Leptoderris glabrata
- Lespedeza cuneata, Chinese bush-clover
- Lespedeza floribunda
- Lespedeza hirta, hairy bushclover
- Libidibia coriaria
- Libidibia glabrata
- Liparia latifolia
- Lonchocarpus castilloi
- Lonchocarpus caudatus
- Lonchocarpus guatemalensis
- Lonchocarpus minimiflorus
- Lonchocarpus rugosus
- Lotononis burchellii
- Lotononis carnosa
- Lotononis involucrata
- Lotononis pachycarpa
- Lotus aboriginus, thicket trefoil
- Lotus arabicus
- Lotus eriosolen
- Lotus maroccanus
- Lotus ononopsis
- Lotus palustris
- Lotus schimperi
- Lotus tetragonolobus, winged pea
- Lupinus argenteus, silver-stem lupine
- Lupinus barkeri
- Lupinus bogotensis
- Lupinus breweri, Brewer's lupine
- Lupinus diffusus, Oak Ridge lupine
- Lupinus grayi, sierra lupine
- Lupinus hispanicus
- Lupinus kingii, King's lupine
- Lupinus microcarpus, chick lupine
- Lupinus nootkatensis, Nootka lupine
- Lupinus obtusilobus, blunt-lobe lupine
- Lupinus pubescens
- Lupinus texensis, Texas bluebonnet
- Lupinus variicolor, Lindley's varied lupine
- Lysiloma acapulcense
- Lysiloma sabicu, horseflesh
- Maackia amurensis, Amur maackia
- Machaerium amplum
- Machaerium brasiliense
- Machaerium cirrhiferum
- Machaerium ferox
- Machaerium madeirense
- Machaerium mutisii
- Machaerium pilosum
- Machaerium scleroxylon
- Macrolobium acaciifolium
- Macrolobium gracile
- Macrolobium huberianum
- Macrolobium limbatum
- Macrolobium pendulum
- Macrolobium suaveolens
- Macroptilium bracteatum
- Macrosamanea consanguinea
- Macrosamanea pubiramea
- Macrotyloma geocarpum
- Malpighia cubensis, lady hair
- Maniltoa floribunda
- Maniltoa minor
- Marina orcuttii, Sonoran desert marina
- Marina parryi, Parry's marina
- Mecopus nidulans
- Medicago astroites
- Medicago bondevii
- Medicago carstiensis
- Medicago platycarpa
- Medicago prostrata
- Medicago secundiflora
- Medicago tenoreana
- Melilotus italicus, Italian melilot
- Melolobium microphyllum
- Microcharis microcharoides
- Millettia acutiflora
- Millettia bequaertii
- Millettia borneensis
- Millettia brachycarpa
- Millettia glaucescens
- Millettia hylobia
- Millettia macroura
- Millettia nitida
- Millettia psilopetala
- Millettia pulchra
- Millettia richardiana
- Millettia zechiana
- Mimosa adenantheroides
- Mimosa albida
- Mimosa albolanata
- Mimosa balansae
- Mimosa bimucronata
- Mimosa brachycarpa
- Mimosa busseana
- Mimosa claussenii
- Mimosa cruenta
- Mimosa dolens
- Mimosa foliolosa
- Mimosa furfuracea
- Mimosa gracilis
- Mimosa itatiaiensis
- Mimosa modesta
- Mimosa nuda
- Mimosa paraguariae
- Mimosa pilulifera
- Mimosa pudica, sensitive plant
- Mimosa revoluta
- Mimosa savokaea
- Mimosa wherryana, Wherry's mimosa
- Mimosa xanthocentra
- Monopteryx angustifolia
- Mucuna bracteata
- Mucuna canaliculata
- Mucuna imbricata
- Mucuna paniculata
- Mucuna revoluta
- Mundulea obovata
- Mundulea stenophylla
- Mundulea viridis
- Neochevalierodendron stephanii
- Neonotonia wightii, perennial soybean
- Neptunia oleracea, water mimosa
- Neptunia plena, dead and awake
- Onobrychis kachetica, Kakhetian sainfoin
- Onobrychis stenorhiza
- Onobrychis viciifolia, sainfoin
- Ononis antennata
- Ononis euphrasiifolia
- Ononis pinnata
- Ononis tournefortii
- Ormosia fastigiata
- Ormosia flava
- Ormosia macrodisca
- Ormosia nobilis
- Ormosia panamensis
- Otholobium fruticans
- Otholobium stachyerum
- Oxyrhynchus volubilis, twining bluehood
- Oxytropis ampullata
- Oxytropis cachemiriana
- Oxytropis falcata
- Oxytropis floribunda
- Oxytropis lambertii, purple locoweed
- Oxytropis lanata
- Paracalyx balfourii
- Paraderris cuneifolia
- Paraderris oblongifolia
- Parkia balslevii
- Parkia bicolor
- Parkia biglobosa
- Parkia speciosa
- Parkia timoriana
- Parkia ulei
- Parochetus communis, blue oxalis
- Pediomelum aromaticum, aromatic Indian breadroot
- Periandra heterophylla
- Periandra mediterranea, Brazilian licorice
- Petalostylis labicheoides, butterfly bush
- Phanera khasiana
- Phaseolus polystachios, thicket bean
- Phaseolus xanthotrichus
- Philenoptera laxiflora
- Phyllodium elegans
- Phyllodium pulchellum
- Physostigma cylindrospermum
- Piliostigma malabaricum
- Piscidia grandifolia
- Pithecellobium diversifolium
- Pithecellobium dulce
- Platymiscium dimorphandrum
- Platypodium elegans
- Podalyria myrtillifolia
- Podolobium ilicifolium, prickly shaggy pea
- Poiretia latifolia
- Polygala calcarea, chalk milkwort
- Polygala galapageia, Galapagos milkwort
- Pomaria jamesii, James' caesalpinia
- Pongamia pinnata
- Pongamiopsis pervilleana
- Prosopis kuntzei
- Prosopis laevigata
- Pseudovigna argentea
- Psoralea esculenta, syn. of Pediomelum esculentum, breadroot
- Psorothamnus thompsoniae, Thompson's dalea
- Pterocarpus brenanii
- Pterocarpus lucens
- Pterocarpus officinalis
- Pterocarpus santalinoides
- Pueraria alopecuroides
- Pultenaea euchila, orange pultenaea
- Pultenaea procumbens, heathy bush-pea
- Pultenaea setulosa, Boorman's bush-pea
- Pultenaea vestita, feather bush-pea
- Rhynchosia argentea
- Rhynchosia capensis
- Rhynchosia diversifolia
- Rhynchosia emarginata
- Rhynchosia falconeri
- Rhynchosia galpinii
- Rhynchosia himalensis
- Rhynchosia minima
- Rhynchosia nelsonii
- Rhynchosia pentheri
- Rhynchosia pyramidalis
- Rhynchosia senna
- Rhynchosia totta
- Rhynchotropis marginata
- Robinia hispida, bristly locust
- Robinia neomexicana, New Mexico locust
- Robinia pseudoacacia, black locust
- Samanea saman
- Samanea tubulosa
- Saraca indica
- Schefflerodendron usambarense
- Schotia afra, Karoo boer-bean
- Senna alata
- Senna artemisioides, burnt-leaved acacia
- Senna baccarinii
- Senna bicapsularis, Christmas bush
- Senna ferraria, iron cassia
- Senna foetidissima
- Senna glutinosa, green acacia
- Senna macranthera
- Senna multijuga
- Senna occidentalis
- Senna oxyphylla
- Senna pendula
- Senna rigida
- Senna skinneri
- Senna socotrana
- Senna spectabilis
- Senna tonduzii
- Senna truncata
- Senna viminea
- Sesbania bispinosa
- Sesbania brevipedunculata
- Sesbania cannabina, canicha
- Sesbania drummondii, Drummond's sesbania
- Sesbania javanica
- Sesbania macowaniana
- Sesbania madagascariensis
- Sesbania pachycarpa
- Sesbania sericea
- Sesbania somalensis
- Sesbania transvaalensis
- Sindora siamensis
- Smithia blanda
- Smithia hirsuta
- Smithia sensitiva
- Sophora flavescens
- Sophora nuttalliana, silky sophora
- Spatholobus gyrocarpus
- Spatholobus parviflorus
- Spatholobus pottingeri
- Sphaerolobium linophyllum
- Sphaerophysa salsula, alkali swainsonpea
- Strongylodon craveniae
- Strongylodon madagascariensis
- Stryphnodendron porcatum
- Stylosanthes bracteata
- Swainsona laxa, yellow darling pea
- Swartzia amplifolia
- Swartzia bombycina
- Swartzia brachyrachis
- Swartzia dolichopoda
- Swartzia guatemalensis
- Swartzia macrosema
- Swartzia macrostachya
- Swartzia panacoco
- Swartzia picta
- Swartzia remiger
- Swartzia simplex
- Swartzia tomentifera
- Sweetia fruticosa
- Syrmatium tomentosum, Heermann's trefoil
- Tachigali paniculata
- Tadehagi rodgeri
- Tamarindus indica, tamarind
- Templetonia aculeata, spiny mallee pea
- Tephrosia aequilata
- Tephrosia aurantiaca
- Tephrosia brachyodon
- Tephrosia cephalantha
- Tephrosia chimanimaniana
- Tephrosia coccinea
- Tephrosia cordatistipula
- Tephrosia dura
- Tephrosia eriocarpa
- Tephrosia heterophylla
- Tephrosia huillensis
- Tephrosia marginella
- Tephrosia odorata
- Tephrosia onobrychoides, multi-bloom hoary-pea
- Tephrosia paradoxa
- Tephrosia tinctoria
- Tephrosia villosa
- Tessmannia africana
- Tetragonolobus maritimus
- Tetrapterocarpon geayi
- Thermopsis montana, montane golden-banner
- Trifolium africanum, Erasmus clover
- Trifolium alpinum, alpine clover
- Trifolium amabile, Aztec clover
- Trifolium angustifolium, white clover
- Trifolium bejariense, Bejar clover
- Trifolium canescens, graying clover
- Trifolium caucasicum, Caucasian clover
- Trifolium ciliolatum, foothill clover
- Trifolium clusii
- Trifolium gymnocarpon, hollyleaf clover
- Trifolium incarnatum, crimson clover
- Trifolium masaiense
- Trifolium obscurum
- Trifolium parryi, Parry's clover
- Trifolium patulum
- Trifolium pratense, red clover
- Trifolium riograndense, Rio Grande clover
- Trifolium scabrum, rough clover
- Trifolium schimperi
- Trifolium subterraneum, subterranean clover
- Trifolium wigginsii
- Trigonella cylindracea
- Trigonella fimbriata
- Trigonella grandiflora
- Tristellateia africana
- Ulex densus
- Ulex europaeus, common gorse
- Uraria picta
- Vaccinium dunalianum
- Vachellia acuifera
- Vachellia amythethophylla
- Vachellia astringens
- Vachellia bellula
- Vachellia farnesiana
- Vachellia oerfota
- Vachellia seyal
- Vicia amoena, Cheder ebs
- Vicia cretica
- Vicia leucophaea, Mogollon vetch
- Vicia lomensis
- Vicia minutiflora, pygmy-flower vetch
- Vicia oroboides
- Vicia orobus, upright vetch
- Vicia pisiformis, pale-flower vetch
- Vicia sativa, common vetch
- Vicia tenuifolia, bramble vetch
- Vigna dalzelliana
- Vigna microsperma
- Viguieranthus pervillei
- Wiborgia fusca
- Wiborgia tetraptera
- Xanthophyllum pulchrum
- Zapoteca formosa
- Zollernia glabra
- Zollernia paraensis
- Zornia brevipes
- Zornia pardina
- Zygia ampla, jarendeua de sapo
- Zygia cognata
- Zygia englesingii
- Zygocarpum caeruleum

Subspecies

- Acacia hebeclada subsp. chobiensis
- Mundulea sericea subsp. madagascariensis
- Trifolium masaiense subsp. masaiense
- Trifolium masaiense subsp. morotoense

Varieties

- Albizia niopoides var. colombiana
- Anadenanthera colubrina var. cebil, curupay
- Cassia afrofistula var. patentipila
- Macrotyloma uniflorum var. verrucosum
- Peltophorum dasyrachis var. tonkinensis
- Polygala galapageia var. galapageia
- Serianthes melanesica var. melanesica

=== Fagales ===
==== Betulaceae ====
Species

- Alnus acuminata, alder
- Alnus alnobetula, green alder
- Alnus cordata, Italian alder
- Alnus cremastogyne
- Alnus ferdinandi-coburgii
- Alnus formosana
- Alnus glutinosa, black alder
- Alnus hirsuta, Manchurian alder
- Alnus incana, grey alder
- Alnus japonica, Japanese alder
- Alnus jorullensis, Mount Jorullo alder
- Alnus mandshurica
- Alnus matsumurae
- Alnus nepalensis, Nepal black cedar
- Alnus nitida
- Alnus oblongifolia, Arizona alder
- Alnus pendula
- Alnus rhombifolia, white alder
- Alnus rubra, red alder
- Alnus serrulata, hazel alder
- Alnus subcordata
- Alnus trabeculosa
- Betula alleghaniensis, yellow birch
- Betula alnoides, Indian birch
- Betula ashburneri
- Betula calcicola
- Betula chinensis, China birch
- Betula cordifolia, mountain white birch
- Betula corylifolia
- Betula costata
- Betula cylindrostachya
- Betula dahurica, Asian black birch
- Betula delavayi
- Betula ermanii, stone birch
- Betula fruticosa, Japanese bog birch
- Betula glandulosa, resin birch
- Betula gmelinii
- Betula grossa, Japanese cherry birch
- Betula humilis, shrubby birch
- Betula lenta, sweet birch
- Betula luminifera
- Betula maximowicziana, monarch birch
- Betula michauxii, Newfoundland dwarf birch
- Betula microphylla
- Betula nana, Arctic dwarf birch
- Betula nigra
- Betula occidentalis, western birch
- Betula papyrifera, paper birch
- Betula pendula, weeping birch
- Betula populifolia, wire birch
- Betula potaninii
- Betula pubescens, downy birch
- Betula pumila
- Betula raddeana, Radde's birch
- Betula schmidtii
- Betula utilis
- Carpinus betulus, common hornbeam
- Carpinus caroliniana, American hornbeam
- Carpinus chuniana
- Carpinus cordata, Sawa hornbeam
- Carpinus fangiana
- Carpinus fargesiana
- Carpinus firmifolia
- Carpinus henryana
- Carpinus kawakamii
- Carpinus londoniana
- Carpinus monbeigiana
- Carpinus orientalis, Oriental hornbeam
- Carpinus polyneura
- Carpinus pubescens
- Carpinus rankanensis
- Carpinus shensiensis
- Carpinus tropicalis
- Carpinus tsaiana
- Carpinus tschonoskii, Asian hornbeam
- Carpinus turczaninowii, Turczaninow's hornbeam
- Carpinus viminea
- Corylus americana, American hazel
- Corylus avellana, hazel
- Corylus chinensis
- Corylus colurna, Turkish hazel
- Corylus cornuta, beaked hazel
- Corylus fargesii
- Corylus ferox
- Corylus heterophylla
- Corylus sieboldiana
- Corylus yunnanensis, Yunnan hazel
- Ostrya carpinifolia, European hop-hornbeam
- Ostrya chinensis
- Ostrya japonica
- Ostrya knowltonii, Knowlton's hop-hornbeam
- Ostrya virginiana, eastern hop hornbeam
- Ostryopsis davidiana

Subspecies

- Alnus glutinosa subsp. betuloides
- Betula pendula subsp. pendula, European silver birch
- Carpinus orientalis subsp. orientalis
- Ostrya virginiana subsp. guatemalensis
- Ostrya virginiana subsp. virginiana, American hop-hornbeam

Varieties

- Betula dahurica var. dahurica

==== Casuarinaceae ====
- Casuarina equisetifolia

==== Fagaceae ====
Species

- Castanea crenata
- Castanea mollissima
- Castanea pumila
- Castanea sativa
- Castanopsis acuminatissima
- Castanopsis argyrophylla
- Castanopsis armata
- Castanopsis borneensis
- Castanopsis brevispinula
- Castanopsis carlesii
- Castanopsis ceratacantha
- Castanopsis chinensis
- Castanopsis chunii
- Castanopsis clarkei
- Castanopsis clemensii
- Castanopsis costata
- Castanopsis cuspidata
- Castanopsis delavayi
- Castanopsis densinervia
- Castanopsis diversifolia
- Castanopsis echinocarpa
- Castanopsis eyrei
- Castanopsis faberi
- Castanopsis fargesii
- Castanopsis ferox
- Castanopsis fissa
- Castanopsis fordii
- Castanopsis formosana
- Castanopsis fulva
- Castanopsis hupehensis
- Castanopsis hypophoenicea
- Castanopsis indica
- Castanopsis javanica
- Castanopsis jucunda
- Castanopsis lamontii
- Castanopsis lanceifolia
- Castanopsis megacarpa
- Castanopsis motleyana
- Castanopsis orthacantha
- Castanopsis oviformis
- Castanopsis paucispina
- Castanopsis pierrei
- Castanopsis platyacantha
- Castanopsis purpurella
- Castanopsis sclerophylla
- Castanopsis sieboldii
- Castanopsis tibetana
- Castanopsis tribuloides
- Chrysolepis chrysophylla
- Fagus crenata
- Fagus engleriana
- Fagus grandifolia
- Fagus japonica
- Fagus orientalis
- Fagus sylvatica
- Lithocarpus amygdalifolius
- Lithocarpus bancanus
- Lithocarpus bennettii
- Lithocarpus blumeanus
- Lithocarpus brassii
- Lithocarpus brevicaudatus
- Lithocarpus brochidodromus
- Lithocarpus bullatus
- Lithocarpus calophyllus
- Lithocarpus cantleyanus
- Lithocarpus caudatifolius
- Lithocarpus celebicus
- Lithocarpus confinis
- Lithocarpus conocarpus
- Lithocarpus coopertus
- Lithocarpus corneus
- Lithocarpus craibianus
- Lithocarpus daphnoideus
- Lithocarpus dasystachyus
- Lithocarpus dealbatus
- Lithocarpus edulis
- Lithocarpus elegans
- Lithocarpus encleisacarpus
- Lithocarpus ewyckii
- Lithocarpus fenestratus
- Lithocarpus garrettianus
- Lithocarpus glaber
- Lithocarpus gracilis
- Lithocarpus hancei
- Lithocarpus harlandii
- Lithocarpus henryi
- Lithocarpus hypoglaucus
- Lithocarpus imperialis
- Lithocarpus iteaphyllus
- Lithocarpus javensis
- Lithocarpus kawakamii
- Lithocarpus konishii
- Lithocarpus lauterbachii
- Lithocarpus lepidocarpus
- Lithocarpus leptogyne
- Lithocarpus lindleyanus
- Lithocarpus litseifolius
- Lithocarpus luteus
- Lithocarpus magneinii
- Lithocarpus megacarpus
- Lithocarpus meijeri
- Lithocarpus muluensis
- Lithocarpus nieuwenhuisii
- Lithocarpus pachyphyllus
- Lithocarpus paniculatus
- Lithocarpus philippinensis
- Lithocarpus polystachyus
- Lithocarpus rosthornii
- Lithocarpus rufovillosus
- Lithocarpus sericobalanos
- Lithocarpus skanianus
- Lithocarpus solerianus
- Lithocarpus sulitii
- Lithocarpus sundaicus
- Lithocarpus taitoensis
- Lithocarpus thomsonii
- Lithocarpus truncatus
- Lithocarpus turbinatus
- Lithocarpus uraianus
- Lithocarpus urceolaris
- Lithocarpus uvariifolius
- Lithocarpus variolosus
- Lithocarpus vestitus
- Lithocarpus xylocarpus
- Notholithocarpus densiflorus
- Quercus acatenangensis
- Quercus acrodonta
- Quercus acuta
- Quercus acutissima
- Quercus affinis
- Quercus agrifolia, coast live oak
- Quercus alba, white oak
- Quercus albocinta
- Quercus aliena
- Quercus alnifolia, golden oak
- Quercus annulata
- Quercus aquifolioides
- Quercus argentata
- Quercus aristata, encino manzano
- Quercus arizonica, Arizona white oak
- Quercus augustinei
- Quercus aucheri
- Quercus augustinei
- Quercus auricoma
- Quercus baloot
- Quercus baronii
- Quercus berberidifolia, California scrub oak
- Quercus bicolor, swamp white oak
- Quercus blakei
- Quercus brandisiana
- Quercus brantii, Brant oak
- Quercus buckleyi, Buckley oak
- Quercus bumelioides
- Quercus calophylla
- Quercus canbyi
- Quercus castanea
- Quercus cerris, turkey oak
- Quercus championii
- Quercus chapmanii, Chapman oak
- Quercus chihuahuensis
- Quercus chrysolepis, canyon oak
- Quercus chungii
- Quercus ciliaris
- Quercus coccifera, Kermes oak
- Quercus cocciferoides
- Quercus coccinea, scarlet oak
- Quercus confertifolia
- Quercus congesta
- Quercus convallata
- Quercus conzattii
- Quercus cornelius-mulleri, Muller oak
- Quercus corrugata
- Quercus crassifolia, leather leaf Mexican oak
- Quercus crassipes
- Quercus delavayi
- Quercus dentata
- Quercus depressa
- Quercus depressipes
- Quercus deserticola
- Quercus dolicholepis
- Quercus douglasii, blue oak
- Quercus durata, leather oak
- Quercus eduardi
- Quercus ellipsoidalis, Hill's oak
- Quercus elliptica
- Quercus emoryi, Emory oak
- Quercus engleriana
- Quercus fabrei
- Quercus faginea, Portuguese oak
- Quercus falcata, southern red oak
- Quercus floribunda
- Quercus frainetto, Hungarian oak
- Quercus franchetii
- Quercus frutex
- Quercus fulva
- Quercus fusiformis
- Quercus gambelii, Gambel oak
- Quercus gambleana
- Quercus garryana, Oregon white oak
- Quercus gemelliflora
- Quercus geminata, sand live oak
- Quercus germana
- Quercus gilliana
- Quercus gilva
- Quercus glabrescens
- Quercus glauca
- Quercus glaucescens, encino blanco
- Quercus glaucoides
- Quercus gravesii, Chisos red oak
- Quercus greggii
- Quercus griffithii
- Quercus grisea
- Quercus guyavifolia
- Quercus helferiana
- Quercus hemisphaerica, Darlington oak
- Quercus humboldtii
- Quercus hypoleucoides, silverleaf oak
- Quercus hypoxantha
- Quercus ichnusae
- Quercus ilex, holm oak
- Quercus ilicifolia, bear oak
- Quercus imbricaria, shingle oak
- Quercus incana, bluejack oak
- Quercus infectoria
- Quercus inopina, sandhill oak
- Quercus intricata
- Quercus invaginata
- Quercus ithaburensis
- Quercus john-tuckeri
- Quercus jonesii, palo manzano
- Quercus kelloggii, California black oak
- Quercus kerrii
- Quercus laceyi, lacey oak
- Quercus laeta
- Quercus laevis, turkey oak
- Quercus lanata
- Quercus lancifolia
- Quercus laurifolia, swamp laurel oak
- Quercus laurina
- Quercus libani
- Quercus liebmannii
- Quercus lineata
- Quercus longinux
- Quercus longispica
- Quercus lusitanica
- Quercus lyrata, overcup oak
- Quercus macranthera
- Quercus macrocalyx
- Quercus macrocarpa, bur oak
- Quercus magnoliifolia
- Quercus margarettae, sand post oak
- Quercus marilandica, blackjack oak
- Quercus martinezii
- Quercus mexicana
- Quercus michauxii, swamp chestnut oak
- Quercus microphylla
- Quercus minima, dwarf live oak
- Quercus miyagii
- Quercus mohriana, Mohr oak
- Quercus mongolica, Mongolian oak
- Quercus monimotricha
- Quercus montana, chestnut oak
- Quercus morii
- Quercus muehlenbergii, chinkapin oak
- Quercus myrsinifolia
- Quercus myrtifolia, myrtle oak
- Quercus nigra, water oak
- Quercus oblongifolia, Mexican blue oak
- Quercus obtusata
- Quercus oxyodon
- Quercus pachyloma
- Quercus pagoda, cherrybark oak
- Quercus palustris, pin oak
- Quercus pannosa
- Quercus peduncularis
- Quercus petraea, sessile oak
- Quercus phellos, willow oak
- Quercus phillyreoides
- Quercus planipocula
- Quercus poilanei
- Quercus polymorpha, net-leaf white oak
- Quercus potosina
- Quercus praeco
- Quercus pringlei
- Quercus prinoides, dwarf chinquapin oak
- Quercus pubescens, downy oak
- Quercus pumila, runner oak
- Quercus pungens, sandpaper oak
- Quercus pyrenaica, Pyrenean oak
- Quercus rehderiana
- Quercus repanda
- Quercus resinosa
- Quercus rex
- Quercus robur, English oak
- Quercus rotundifolia, holm oak
- Quercus rubra, northern red oak
- Quercus rugosa
- Quercus salicifolia
- Quercus salicina
- Quercus sapotifolia
- Quercus schottkyana
- Quercus scytophylla
- Quercus sebifera
- Quercus segoviensis
- Quercus semecarpifolia
- Quercus semiserrata
- Quercus senescens
- Quercus serrata
- Quercus sessilifolia
- Quercus setulosa
- Quercus shumardii, Shumard oak
- Quercus sideroxyla
- Quercus similis, swamp post oak
- Quercus sinuata, bastard oak
  - Quercus sinuata var. breviloba, Bigelow oak
  - Quercus sinuata var. sinuata, Durand oak
- Quercus sororia
- Quercus spinosa
- Quercus stellata, post oak
- Quercus stenophylloides
- Quercus stewardiana
- Quercus striatula
- Quercus suber, cork oak
- Quercus subspathulata
- Quercus tarahumara
- Quercus texana, nuttall oak
- Quercus trojana, Macedonian oak
- Quercus tuberculata
- Quercus turbinella, Sonoran scrub oak
- Quercus urbani
- Quercus uxoris
- Quercus vacciniifolia, huckleberry oak
- Quercus variabilis
- Quercus vaseyana, Vasey oak
- Quercus velutina, black oak
- Quercus viminea
- Quercus virginiana, southern live oak
- Quercus vulcanica
- Quercus wislizeni
- Quercus wutaishanica
- Quercus xalapensis

==== Juglandaceae ====
- Alfaroa costaricensis
- Alfaroa williamsii
- Carya aquatica
- Carya cordiformis
- Carya floridana
- Carya glabra
- Carya illinoinensis
- Carya laciniosa
- Carya myristiciformis
- Carya ovata
- Carya pallida
- Carya texana
- Carya tomentosa
- Engelhardia rigida
- Engelhardia roxburghiana
- Engelhardia serrata
- Engelhardia spicata
- Juglans hindsii
- Juglans major
- Juglans microcarpa
- Juglans mollis
- Juglans nigra
- Juglans regia
- Oreomunnea mexicana
- Pterocarya rhoifolia
- Pterocarya stenoptera

==== Myricaceae ====
- Myrica cacuminis
- Myrica californica
- Myrica caroliniensis
- Myrica cerifera
- Myrica chevalieri
- Myrica faya
- Myrica gale
- Myrica inodora
- Myrica integra
- Myrica javanica
- Myrica lindeniana
- Myrica parvifolia
- Myrica pensylvanica
- Myrica picardae
- Myrica pilulifera
- Myrica pringlei
- Myrica pubescens
- Myrica punctata
- Myrica salicifolia
- Myrica serrata
- Myrica shaferi
- Myrica spathulata

==== Nothofagaceae ====
- Nothofagus alpina
- Nothofagus antarctica
- Nothofagus balansae
- Nothofagus betuloides
- Nothofagus brassii
- Nothofagus carrii
- Nothofagus cliffortioides
- Nothofagus dombeyi
- Nothofagus flaviramea
- Nothofagus fusca
- Nothofagus grandis
- Nothofagus menziesii
- Nothofagus nitida
- Nothofagus obliqua
- Nothofagus perryi
- Nothofagus pullei
- Nothofagus pumilio
- Nothofagus resinosa
- Nothofagus rubra
- Nothofagus solandri
- Nothofagus starkenborghiorum
- Nothofagus truncata

=== Garryales ===
- Aucuba chinensis
- Aucuba chlorascens
- Aucuba himalaica
- Aucuba obcordata
- Garrya elliptica
- Garrya fadyenii
- Garrya flavescens
- Garrya fremontii
- Garrya glaberrima
- Garrya laurifolia
- Garrya longifolia
- Garrya ovata
- Garrya veatchii
- Garrya wrightii

=== Gentianales ===
==== Apocynaceae ====
Species

- Acokanthera rotundata
- Alstonia angustifolia
- Alstonia boonei
- Alstonia costata
- Alstonia macrophylla
- Alstonia pneumatophora
- Alstonia scholaris, blackboard tree
- Alstonia spatulata
- Aspidosperma darienense
- Aspidosperma pyricollum
- Calotropis procera
- Carissa macrocarpa
- Cerbera manghas
- Cerbera odollam
- Dyera costulata
- Holarrhena floribunda
- Holarrhena pubescens, bitter oleander
- Kopsia dasyrachis
- Nerium oleander, oleander
- Ochrosia oppositifolia
- Pachypodium geayi
- Petchia madagascariensis
- Pleiocarpa mutica
- Pleiocarpa pycnantha
- Plumeria rubra
- Rauvolfia media
- Rauvolfia verticillata
- Rhigospira quadrangularis
- Schizozygia coffaeoides
- Stemmadenia tomentosa
- Tabernaemontana africana
- Tabernaemontana alba
- Tabernaemontana amygdalifolia
- Tabernaemontana angulata
- Tabernaemontana arborea
- Tabernaemontana attenuata
- Tabernaemontana aurantiaca
- Tabernaemontana bovina
- Tabernaemontana brachyantha
- Tabernaemontana bufalina
- Tabernaemontana calcarea
- Tabernaemontana coffeoides
- Tabernaemontana corymbosa
- Tabernaemontana divaricata
- Tabernaemontana elegans
- Tabernaemontana panamensis
- Tabernaemontana polyneura
- Tabernaemontana thurstonii
- Tabernaemontana ventricosa
- Tabernanthe iboga
- Vallesia glabra, pearlberry
- Voacanga thouarsii
- Wrightia arborea
- Wrightia laevis
- Wrightia natalensis

Subspecies

- Adenium obesum subsp. sokotranum, desert rose
- Wrightia pubescens subsp. lanitii

Varieties

- Vallesia glabra var. pubescens

==== Asclepiadaceae ====
- Asclepias exaltata
- Asclepias incarnata
- Australluma peschii
- Baynesia lophophora
- Brachystelma schinzii
- Brachystelma schultzei
- Ceropegia decidua
- Ceropegia dinteri
- Cryptolepis arbuscula
- Cryptolepis intricata
- Cynanchum acutum
- Hoodia juttae
- Hoodia ruschii
- Hoodia triebneri
- Huernia hallii
- Huernia plowesii
- Kanahia laniflora
- Larryleachia tirasmontana
- Lavrania haagnerae
- Marsdenia obscura
- Matelea rivularis
- Oxystelma esculentum
- Sarcostemma angustissimum, Galapagos sarcostemma
- Secamone socotrana
- Stapelia pearsonii
- Tridentea pachyrrhiza
- Vincetoxicum linifolium

==== Gentianaceae ====
- Anthocleista madagascariensis
- Bartonia paniculata
- Centaurium candelabrum
- Centaurium erythraea, common centaury
- Centaurium pulchellum, lesser centaury
- Exacum affine
- Exacum arabicum
- Gentiana acaulis, stemless gentian
- Gentiana douglasiana
- Gentiana ligustica
- Gentiana punctata, spotted gentian
- Gentiana purpurea, purple gentian
- Gentiana rubricaulis
- Gentiana sceptrum
- Gentianella cernua
- Gentianella foliosa
- Gentianella limoselloides
- Gentianella rupicola
- Gentianella splendens
- Gentianopsis crinita
- Gentianopsis detonsa
- Gentianopsis virgata
- Halenia longicaulis
- Halenia pulchella
- Hoppea dichotoma
- Hoppea fastigiata
- Lomatogonium rotatum
- Sebaea microphylla
- Sebaea pentandra
- Swertia iberica
- Swertia longifolia

==== Loganiaceae ====
- Geniostoma astylum
- Geniostoma confertiflorum
- Geniostoma rapense
- Geniostoma uninervium
- Neuburgia collina
- Strychnos mellodora

==== Rubiaceae ====
Species

- Aulacocalyx caudata
- Aulacocalyx jasminiflora
- Aulacocalyx laxiflora
- Aulacocalyx talbotii
- Baloghia bureavii
- Breonia chinensis
- Breonia decaryana
- Breonia fragifera
- Breonia perrieri
- Catesbaea parviflora
- Cephalanthus occidentalis
- Chassalia bojeri
- Chassalia catatii
- Chassalia princei
- Chiococca alba
- Cinchona antioquiae
- Cinchona barbacoensis
- Cinchona macrocalyx
- Cinchona micrantha
- Cinchona pitayensis
- Coprosma nephelephila
- Coprosma orohenensis
- Coprosma reticulata
- Dentella repens
- Dirichletia obovata
- Ernodea littoralis
- Exostema acuminatum
- Exostema caribaeum
- Exostema nitens
- Exostema purpureum
- Gaertnera arenaria
- Gaertnera macrobotrys
- Gaertnera macrostipula
- Gaertnera madagascariensis
- Gaertnera obovata
- Gaertnera phanerophlebia
- Gaertnera phyllosepala
- Gaertnera phyllostachya
- Gaillonia puberula
- Gaillonia tinctoria
- Galium ascendens
- Galium asprellum
- Galium debile, slender marsh-bedstraw
- Galium labradoricum
- Galium palustre
- Galium tinctorium
- Galium trifidum
- Galium triflorum
- Galium uliginosum, fen bedstraw
- Gardenia gummifera
- Gardenia hutchinsoniana
- Genipa americana
- Guettarda krugii, frogwood
- Guettarda scabra
- Hymenodictyon berivotrense
- Hymenodictyon decaryi
- Hymenodictyon louhavate
- Hymenodictyon occidentale
- Hymenodictyon perrieri
- Hymenodictyon septentrionale
- Ixora chinensis
- Ixora moorensis
- Ixora oligantha
- Ixora setchellii
- Ixora stokesii
- Oldenlandia balfourii
- Oldenlandia bicornuta
- Oldenlandia capensis
- Oldenlandia diffusa, snake-needle grass
- Oldenlandia pulvinata
- Pentagonia macrophylla
- Pentodon pentandrus
- Placopoda virgata
- Prismatomeris beccariana
- Prismatomeris filamentosa
- Prismatomeris glabra
- Prismatomeris griffithii
- Prismatomeris tetrandra
- Psychotria chalconeura
- Psychotria glabrata
- Psychotria ligustrifolia, smooth wild coffee
- Psychotria raivavaensis
- Psychotria urbaniana
- Rachicallis americana
- Randia aculeata
- Razafimandimbisonia humblotii
- Razafimandimbisonia minor
- Razafimandimbisonia sambiranensis
- Scyphiphora hydrophylacea
- Spermacoce tetraquetra, pineland false buttonweed
- Stenostomum coriaceum, peg wood
- Stenostomum lucidum
- Stenostomum myrtifolium
- Strumpfia maritima
- Tamridaea capsulifera

Subspecies

- Canthium glaucum subsp. frangula
- Canthium glaucum subsp. glaucum

=== Geraniales ===
Species

- Erodium foetidum, rock stork's-bill
- Hydrocera triflora, marsh henna
- Impatiens balansae
- Impatiens baronii
- Impatiens capensis
- Impatiens hydrogetonoides
- Impatiens leedalii
- Impatiens meruensis
- Impatiens noli-tangere
- Oxalis ausensis
- Oxalis disticha
- Oxalis dregei
- Oxalis luederitzii
- Oxalis schaeferi
- Sarcotheca glauca
- Sarcotheca glomerula
- Sarcotheca macrophylla
- Sarcotheca rubrinervis

Subspecies

- Impatiens hydrogetonoides subsp. hydrogetonoides

=== Haloragales ===
==== Haloragaceae ====
- Myriophyllum alterniflorum, alternate water-milfoil
- Myriophyllum farwellii
- Myriophyllum heterophyllum
- Myriophyllum hippuroides
- Myriophyllum humile
- Myriophyllum indicum
- Myriophyllum oliganthum
- Myriophyllum pinnatum
- Myriophyllum quitense
- Myriophyllum sibiricum
- Myriophyllum spicatum, spiked water-milfoil
- Myriophyllum tenellum
- Myriophyllum tuberculatum
- Myriophyllum ussuriense
- Myriophyllum verticillatum, whorled leaf water milfoil
- Proserpinaca intermedia
- Proserpinaca palustris
- Proserpinaca pectinata

=== Icacinales ===
==== Icacinaceae ====
- Alsodeiopsis schumannii
- Cassinopsis ilicifolia
- Cassinopsis madagascariensis
- Cassinopsis tinifolia
- Leretia cordata
- Mappia montana
- Mappia pittosporoides
- Mappia racemosa
- Merrilliodendron megacarpum
- Ryticaryum longifolium
- Ryticaryum macrocarpum
- Ryticaryum novoguineense
- Ryticaryum oleraceum
- Ryticaryum oxycarpum
- Vadensea tenuifolia
- Vadensea vogelii

==== Oncothecaceae ====
- Oncotheca humboldtiana

=== Lamiales ===
==== Acanthaceae ====
Species

- Acanthopale laxiflora
- Acanthopale macrocarpa
- Acanthus ebracteatus, acanthus
- Acanthus ilicifolius, holy mangrove
- Acanthus montanus
- Acanthus volubilis
- Anisotes diversifolius
- Anisotes dumosus
- Anisotes macrophyllus
- Anisotes parvifolius
- Asystasia laticapsula
- Asystasia macrophylla
- Asystasia moorei
- Asystasia richardsiae
- Barleria aculeata
- Barleria angustiloba
- Barleria boranensis
- Barleria diplotricha
- Barleria granarii
- Barleria hirtifructa
- Barleria holstii
- Barleria inclusa
- Barleria kitchingii
- Barleria masaiensis
- Barleria neurophylla
- Barleria nyasensis
- Barleria paolioides
- Barleria polhillii
- Barleria robertsoniae
- Barleria venenata
- Barleria volkensii
- Blepharis inopinata
- Blepharis itigiensis
- Blepharis longifolia
- Blepharis panduriformis
- Blepharis trispina
- Brachystephanus holstii
- Brillantaisia lamium
- Brillantaisia owariensis
- Brillantaisia soyauxii
- Crossandra infundibuliformis
- Crossandra leucodonta
- Crossandra pungens
- Crossandra stenandrium
- Crossandra tridentata
- Crossandrella dusenii
- Dicliptera albicaulis
- Dicliptera brevispicata
- Dicliptera effusa
- Dicliptera elliotii
- Dicliptera vollesenii
- Dischistocalyx hirsutus
- Duosperma grandiflorum
- Duosperma kilimandscharicum
- Duosperma longicalyx
- Duosperma tanzaniense
- Dyschoriste keniensis
- Dyschoriste tanzaniensis
- Dyschoriste thunbergiiflora
- Ecbolium amplexicaule
- Ecbolium madagascariense
- Elytraria minor
- Hygrophila abyssinica
- Hygrophila auriculata
- Hygrophila balsamica
- Hygrophila difformis
- Hygrophila gracillima
- Hygrophila heinei
- Hygrophila pinnatifida, miramar weed
- Hygrophila polysperma, dwarf hygrophila
- Hygrophila quadrivalvis
- Hygrophila salicifolia
- Hygrophila schulli
- Hygrophila senegalensis
- Hygrophila uliginosa
- Hypoestes aristata
- Hypoestes pubescens
- Isoglossa ixodes
- Isoglossa lactea
- Isoglossa laxa
- Isoglossa multinervis
- Isoglossa paucinervis
- Isoglossa substrobilina
- Justicia acutifolia
- Justicia afromontana
- Justicia americana
- Justicia brevipedunculata
- Justicia bridsoniana
- Justicia inaequifolia
- Justicia interrupta
- Justicia laxa
- Justicia leikipiensis
- Justicia lorata
- Justicia microthyrsa
- Justicia oblongifolia
- Justicia pseudorungia
- Justicia quinqueangularis
- Justicia rigida
- Justicia tricostata
- Justicia udzungwaensis
- Lankesteria alba
- Megalochlamys tanzaniensis
- Mendoncia cowanii
- Mendoncia flagellaris
- Mendoncia vinciflora
- Mimulopsis kilimandscharica
- Mimulopsis marronia
- Monechma serotinum
- Neuracanthus keniensis
- Neuracanthus tephrophyllus
- Phaulopsis angolana
- Phaulopsis gediensis
- Phaulopsis imbricata
- Phaulopsis micrantha
- Pseuderanthemum hookerianum
- Rhinacanthus scoparius
- Rhinacanthus virens
- Ruellia currorii
- Ruellia dioscoridis
- Ruellia insignis
- Ruellia primuloides
- Sanchezia parviflora
- Sanchezia sericea
- Sclerochiton vogelii
- Spathacanthus hahnianus
- Stenandrium guineense
- Thomandersia hensii
- Thomandersia laurifolia

Subspecies

- Barleria polhillii subsp. nidus-avis
- Barleria polhillii subsp. polhillii
- Barleria polhillii subsp. turkanae
- Duosperma longicalyx subsp. longicalyx
- Dyschoriste keniensis subsp. keniensis
- Isoglossa lactea subsp. lactea
- Isoglossa lactea subsp. saccata
- Isoglossa substrobilina subsp. substrobilina
- Neuracanthus tephrophyllus subsp. conifer
- Neuracanthus tephrophyllus subsp. tephrophyllus

==== Avicenniaceae ====
- Avicennia alba
- Avicennia germinans, black mangrove
- Avicennia marina, gray mangrove
- Avicennia officinalis
- Avicennia schaueriana

==== Bignoniaceae ====
Species

- Crescentia cujete
- Deplanchea bancana
- Dolichandrone spathacea
- Jacaranda caerulea
- Jacaranda caroba
- Jacaranda caucana
- Jacaranda copaia
- Jacaranda micrantha
- Jacaranda obtusifolia
- Jacaranda rufa
- Markhamia stipulata
- Phyllarthron bojerianum
- Phyllarthron multiflorum
- Tabebuia heterophylla
- Tabebuia impetiginosa
- Tabebuia pallida
- Tecoma stans

Subspecies

- Radermachera pinnata subsp. acuminata

==== Gesneriaceae ====
- Besleria comosa
- Columnea tenensis
- Cyrtandra anthropophagorum
- Gesneria exserta
- Haberlea rhodopensis
- Ornithoboea barbanthera
- Ornithoboea pseudoflexuosa
- Paraboea divaricata
- Paraboea gracillima
- Paraboea incudicarpa
- Paraboea subplana
- Primulina drakei
- Primulina gemella
- Primulina halongensis
- Primulina hiepii
- Ramonda myconi, Pyrenean-violet
- Ramonda serbica
- Ridleyandra flammea
- Streptocarpus caulescens
- Streptocarpus hirsutissimus
- Streptocarpus kirkii
- Streptocarpus pallidiflorus
- Streptocarpus saxorum

==== Lamiaceae ====
Species

- Aegiphila cordifolia
- Aegiphila sordida
- Ajuga oocephala
- Callicarpa maingayi
- Clinopodium capitellatum
- Clinopodium fasciculatum
- Gmelina arborea
- Lavandula angustifolia, lavender
- Lavandula latifolia, spike lavender
- Lavandula nimmoi
- Leucas kishenensis
- Leucas spiculifera
- Leucas usagarensis
- Leucas virgata
- Lycopus americanus
- Lycopus asper
- Lycopus europaeus, gypsywort
- Lycopus rubellus
- Lycopus uniflorus
- Lycopus virginicus
- Mentha aquatica, water mint
- Mentha arvensis
- Mentha insularis
- Mentha longifolia, horse mint
- Mentha pulegium, pennyroyal
- Mentha requienii, Corsican mint
- Mentha spicata, spearmint
- Mentha suaveolens, round-leaved mint
- Micromeria remota
- Oxera pulchella
- Perilla frutescens
- Physostegia ledinghamii
- Physostegia parviflora
- Platostoma madagascariense
- Plectranthus gibbosus
- Plectranthus socotranus
- Plectranthus vinaceus
- Pogostemon salicifolius
- Pogostemon stellatus
- Pogostemon wightii
- Premna protrusa
- Premna puberula
- Premna serratifolia
- Premna tahitensis
- Prunella vulgaris, self-heal
- Salvia canescens, hoary salvia
- Salvia maximowicziana
- Salvia officinalis, sage
- Salvia quitensis
- Scutellaria galericulata
- Scutellaria lateriflora
- Sideritis glacialis
- Sideritis hyssopifolia, rock tea
- Sideritis leucantha
- Stachys fominii, Fomin's woundwort
- Stachys lyallii
- Stachys palustris, marsh woundwort
- Stachys reptans
- Stachys talyschensis, Talyshian woundwort
- Tetradenia goudotii
- Tetradenia nervosa
- Teucrium balfourii
- Teucrium betonicum
- Teucrium eriocephalum
- Teucrium socotranum
- Thymus baeticus, Spanish lemon thyme
- Thymus mastichina, Spanish marjoram
- Thymus vulgaris, common thyme
- Vitex longisepala
- Volkameria aculeata, prickly myrtle

Subspecies

- Oxera pulchella subsp. pulchella
- Salvia officinalis subsp. lavandulifolia, Spanish sage

==== Lentibulariaceae ====
- Pinguicula corsica
- Pinguicula macroceras
- Pinguicula reichenbachiana
- Pinguicula villosa
- Utricularia aurea
- Utricularia australis, bladderwort
- Utricularia bifida, bifid bladderwort
- Utricularia cornuta
- Utricularia foveolata
- Utricularia geminiscapa
- Utricularia geoffrayi
- Utricularia gibba
- Utricularia graminifolia
- Utricularia intermedia
- Utricularia jamesoniana
- Utricularia juncea
- Utricularia lazulina
- Utricularia microcalyx
- Utricularia minor, lesser bladderwort
- Utricularia ochroleuca
- Utricularia purpurea
- Utricularia pusilla
- Utricularia radiata
- Utricularia resupinata
- Utricularia reticulata
- Utricularia rigida
- Utricularia sandersonii
- Utricularia smithiana
- Utricularia striatula
- Utricularia subulata
- Utricularia vulgaris, greater bladderwort

==== Linderniaceae ====
- Chamaegigas intrepidus
- Lindernia anagallis
- Lindernia antipoda
- Lindernia bolusii
- Lindernia ciliata, hairy slitwort
- Lindernia crustacea
- Lindernia diffusa
- Lindernia dubia
- Lindernia estaminodiosa
- Lindernia hyssopoides
- Lindernia micrantha
- Lindernia mollis
- Lindernia molluginoides
- Lindernia monroi
- Lindernia nummulariifolia, false pimpernel
- Lindernia oppositifolia
- Lindernia parviflora
- Lindernia procumbens
- Lindernia pusilla, tiny slitwort
- Lindernia ruellioides, duckbill pimpernel
- Lindernia tenuifolia
- Lindernia viatica
- Lindernia viscosa
- Lindernia wilmsii
- Torenia bicolor

==== Oleaceae ====
- Chionanthus callophylloides
- Chionanthus cordulatus
- Chionanthus leopoldii
- Chionanthus pluriflorus
- Chionanthus polygamus
- Chionanthus pubescens
- Chionanthus ramiflorus
- Chionanthus sabahensis
- Forestiera segregata
- Fraxinus profunda
- Ligustrum sinense
- Nyctanthes arbor-tristis
- Schrebera alata
- Schrebera trichoclada
- Syringa reticulata
- Tetrapilus brachiatus

==== Pedaliaceae ====
- Sesamothamnus leistneranus

==== Scrophulariaceae ====
- Adenosma indianum
- Bacopa floribunda
- Bacopa hamiltoniana
- Bacopa monnieri, water hyssop
- Bacopa rotundifolia
- Buddleja asiatica
- Buddleja coriacea
- Buddleja domingensis
- Calceolaria aquatica
- Calceolaria fothergillii, lady's slipper
- Calceolaria hyssopifolia
- Calceolaria rosmarinifolia
- Calceolaria sericea
- Castilleja minor
- Castilleja nubigena
- Centranthera indica
- Centranthera tranquebarica
- Chelone glabra
- Curanga amara
- Diclis tenuissima
- Dopatrium junceum, rushlike dopatrium
- Dopatrium longidens
- Dopatrium nudicaule
- Dopatrium senegalense
- Euphrasia genargentea
- Euphrasia hudsoniana
- Glossostigma diandrum
- Gratiola aurea
- Gratiola ebracteata
- Gratiola linifolia
- Gratiola neglecta
- Gratiola officinalis
- Ilysanthes rotundifolia, baby's tears
- Limnophila aromatica
- Limnophila balsamea
- Limnophila chinensis
- Limnophila connata
- Limnophila erecta
- Limnophila geoffrayi
- Limnophila glabra
- Limnophila heterophylla
- Limnophila indica, Indian marshweed
- Limnophila laotica
- Limnophila laxa
- Limnophila micrantha
- Limnophila polystachya
- Limnophila repens
- Limnophila rugosa
- Limnophila sessiliflora
- Limnophila villifera
- Limosella acaulis
- Limosella aquatica, water mudwort
- Limosella inflata
- Limosella macrantha
- Limosella vesiculosa
- Linaria algarviana
- Linaria zangezura, Zangezurian toad-flax
- Lindenbergia indica
- Lindenbergia sokotrana
- Microcarpaea minima, chickweed sparrow
- Mimulus alatus
- Mimulus alsinoides
- Mimulus dentatus
- Mimulus floribundus
- Mimulus glabratus
- Mimulus gracilis
- Mimulus guttatus
- Mimulus lewisii
- Mimulus moschatus
- Mimulus orbicularis
- Mimulus ringens
- Mimulus tilingii
- Myoporum rapense
- Nemesia karasbergensis
- Nemesia violiflora
- Pedicularis groenlandica
- Pedicularis labradorica
- Pedicularis lanceolata
- Pedicularis palustris
- Pedicularis parviflora
- Pedicularis sudetica
- Scrophularia umbrosa
- Selago lepida
- Selago nachtigalii
- Sibthorpia peregrina
- Veronica americana
- Veronica anagallis-aquatica, blue water-speedwell
- Veronica anagalloides
- Veronica beccabunga, brooklime
- Veronica catenata, pink water-speedwell
- Veronica nevadensis
- Veronica peregrina
- Veronica repens
- Veronica scutellata, marsh speedwell
- Veronica serpyllifolia
- Xylocalyx aculeolatus
- Xylocalyx asper

==== Verbenaceae ====
- Coelocarpum socotranum
- Lantana peduncularis, Galapagos lantana
- Phyla lanceolata
- Phyla nodiflora, turkey tangle frogfruit
- Priva socotrana
- Volkameria aculeata, prickly myrtle

==== Other Lamiales species ====
- Byblis aquatica
- Byblis filifolia
- Byblis liniflora
- Byblis rorida
- Nuxia capitata
- Nuxia involucrata
- Nuxia oppositifolia
- Nuxia pachyphylla

=== Laurales ===
==== Atherospermataceae ====
- Atherosperma moschatum
- Daphnandra apatela
- Daphnandra micrantha
- Daphnandra repandula
- Daphnandra tenuipes
- Doryphora aromatica
- Doryphora sassafras
- Dryadodaphne crassa
- Dryadodaphne novoguineensis
- Dryadodaphne trachyphloia
- Laurelia novae-zelandiae
- Laureliopsis philippiana
- Nemuaron vieillardii

==== Hernandiaceae ====
- Gyrocarpus americanus
- Gyrocarpus angustifolius
- Gyrocarpus jatrophifolius
- Hernandia cordigera
- Hernandia didymantha
- Hernandia guianensis
- Hernandia moerenhoutiana
- Hernandia nymphaeifolia
- Hernandia olivacea
- Hernandia stenura
- Sparattanthelium botocudorum

==== Lauraceae ====
- Actinodaphne ambigua
- Actinodaphne angustifolia
- Actinodaphne borneensis
- Actinodaphne cupularis
- Actinodaphne cuspidata, synonym of Actinodaphne notabilis
- Actinodaphne diversifolia
- Actinodaphne elegans
- Actinodaphne forrestii
- Actinodaphne glabra
- Actinodaphne glomerata
- Actinodaphne henryi
- Actinodaphne hypoleucophylla
- Actinodaphne koshepangii
- Actinodaphne lecomtei
- Actinodaphne macrophylla
- Actinodaphne madraspatana
- Actinodaphne malaccensis
- Actinodaphne montana
- Actinodaphne multiflora
- Actinodaphne mushaensis
- Actinodaphne myriantha
- Actinodaphne nitida
- Actinodaphne obovata
- Actinodaphne omeiensis
- Actinodaphne pilosa
- Actinodaphne procera
- Actinodaphne pruinosa
- Actinodaphne sesquipedalis
- Actinodaphne setchuenensis
- Actinodaphne sikkimensis
- Actinodaphne trichocarpa
- Actinodaphne wightiana
- Aiouea acarodomatifera
- Aiouea amoena
- Aiouea costaricensis
- Aiouea dubia
- Aiouea effusa
- Aiouea glaziovii
- Aiouea grandifolia
- Aiouea grisebachii
- Aiouea guianensis
- Aiouea hammeliana
- Aiouea hartmanii
- Aiouea laevis
- Aiouea maguireana
- Aiouea maya
- Aiouea montana
- Aiouea myristicoides
- Aiouea napoensis
- Aiouea neurophylla
- Aiouea pachypoda
- Aiouea padiformis
- Aiouea piauhyensis
- Aiouea pittieri
- Aiouea saligna
- Aiouea sellowiana
- Aiouea tomentella
- Aiouea tonduzii
- Aiouea trinervis
- Aiouea vexatrix
- Alseodaphne archboldiana
- Alseodaphne bancana
- Alseodaphne borneensis
- Alseodaphne elongata
- Alseodaphne foxiana
- Alseodaphne insignis
- Alseodaphne intermedia
- Alseodaphne nigrescens
- Alseodaphne oblanceolata
- Alseodaphne peduncularis
- Alseodaphne perakensis
- Alseodaphne rubrolignea
- Alseodaphne semecarpifolia
- Alseodaphnopsis andersonii
- Andea infrafoveolata
- Andea micans
- Andea multinervis
- Andea sericea
- Andea smithiana
- Andea velutina
- Aniba affinis
- Aniba burchellii
- Aniba canelilla
- Aniba cinnamomiflora
- Aniba citrifolia
- Aniba coto
- Aniba cylindriflora
- Aniba desertorum
- Aniba ferruginea
- Aniba firmula
- Aniba guianensis
- Aniba heringeri
- Aniba hostmanniana
- Aniba hypoglauca
- Aniba intermedia
- Aniba kappleri
- Aniba megaphylla
- Aniba muca
- Aniba panurensis
- Aniba parviflora
- Aniba puchury-minor
- Aniba riparia
- Aniba robusta
- Aniba taubertiana
- Aniba terminalis
- Aniba vaupesiana
- Aniba venezuelana
- Aniba viridis
- Aniba williamsii
- Apollonias barbujana, synonym of Persea barbujana
- Beilschmiedia acutifolia
- Beilschmiedia alloiophylla
- Beilschmiedia appendiculata
- Beilschmiedia bancroftii
- Beilschmiedia bhutanica
- Beilschmiedia brunnea
- Beilschmiedia caloneura
- Beilschmiedia collina
- Beilschmiedia costaricensis
- Beilschmiedia elliptica
- Beilschmiedia emarginata
- Beilschmiedia erythrophloia
- Beilschmiedia fordii
- Beilschmiedia fulva
- Beilschmiedia gaboonensis
- Beilschmiedia gemmiflora
- Beilschmiedia glabra
- Beilschmiedia glauca
- Beilschmiedia hartonoana
- Beilschmiedia hondurensis
- Beilschmiedia insignis
- Beilschmiedia intermedia
- Beilschmiedia kunstleri
- Beilschmiedia kweichowensis
- Beilschmiedia kweo
- Beilschmiedia laevis
- Beilschmiedia latifolia
- Beilschmiedia lucidula
- Beilschmiedia madagascariensis
- Beilschmiedia madang
- Beilschmiedia maingayi
- Beilschmiedia mannii
- Beilschmiedia mexicana
- Beilschmiedia micrantha
- Beilschmiedia minutiflora
- Beilschmiedia obscura
- Beilschmiedia obtusifolia
- Beilschmiedia oligandra
- Beilschmiedia oligantha
- Beilschmiedia pahangensis
- Beilschmiedia palembanica
- Beilschmiedia pendula
- Beilschmiedia peninsularis
- Beilschmiedia pergamentacea
- Beilschmiedia pierreana
- Beilschmiedia recurva
- Beilschmiedia riparia
- Beilschmiedia robusta
- Beilschmiedia roxburghiana
- Beilschmiedia rwandensis
- Beilschmiedia tarairi
- Beilschmiedia taubertiana
- Beilschmiedia tawa
- Beilschmiedia tawaensis
- Beilschmiedia tooram
- Beilschmiedia tovarensis
- Beilschmiedia troupinii
- Beilschmiedia tsangii
- Beilschmiedia ugandensis
- Beilschmiedia variabilis
- Beilschmiedia velutina
- Beilschmiedia volckii
- Beilschmiedia wangii
- Beilschmiedia xizangensis
- Beilschmiedia yunnanensis
- Beilschmiedia zenkeri
- Caryodaphnopsis fosteri
- Caryodaphnopsis inaequalis
- Caryodaphnopsis tomentosa
- Caryodaphnopsis tonkinensis
- Chlorocardium venenosum
- Cinnamomum altissimum
- Cinnamomum appelianum
- Cinnamomum archboldianum
- Cinnamomum aureofulvum
- Cinnamomum austrosinense
- Cinnamomum baileyanum
- Cinnamomum bejolghota
- Cinnamomum bodinieri, synonym of Camphora bodinieri
- Cinnamomum bokorense
- Cinnamomum burmanni
- Cinnamomum camphora, synonym of Camphora officinarum
- Cinnamomum caryophyllus
- Cinnamomum celebicum
- Cinnamomum clemensii
- Cinnamomum crassinervium
- Cinnamomum curvifolium
- Cinnamomum cuspidatum
- Cinnamomum daphnoides
- Cinnamomum doederleinii
- Cinnamomum dubium
- Cinnamomum eugenoliferum
- Cinnamomum foveolatum
- Cinnamomum glanduliferum, synonym of Camphora glandulifera
- Cinnamomum glaucescens, synonym of Camphora glaucescens
- Cinnamomum iners
- Cinnamomum japonicum
- Cinnamomum javanicum
- Cinnamomum jensenianum
- Cinnamomum kerrii
- Cinnamomum laubatii
- Cinnamomum ledermannii
- Cinnamomum liangii
- Cinnamomum macrophyllum
- Cinnamomum malabatrum
- Cinnamomum mercadoi
- Cinnamomum micranthum
- Cinnamomum mollissimum
- Cinnamomum oliveri
- Cinnamomum pachyphyllum
- Cinnamomum parthenoxylon, synonym of Camphora parthenoxylon
- Cinnamomum pedatinervium
- Cinnamomum pendulum
- Cinnamomum pingbienense
- Cinnamomum podagricum
- Cinnamomum politum
- Cinnamomum polyadelphum
- Cinnamomum pseudopedunculatum
- Cinnamomum racemosum
- Cinnamomum rhynchophyllum
- Cinnamomum rigidissimum
- Cinnamomum saxatile
- Cinnamomum scalarinervium
- Cinnamomum scortechinii
- Cinnamomum septentrionale, synonym of Camphora septentrionalis
- Cinnamomum sintoc
- Cinnamomum solomonense
- Cinnamomum subavenium
- Cinnamomum tamala
- Cinnamomum tazia
- Cinnamomum tenuifolium
- Cinnamomum tenuipile
- Cinnamomum tonkinense
- Cinnamomum tsangii
- Cinnamomum vimineum
- Cinnamomum virens
- Cinnamomum wilsonii
- Cinnamomum yabunikkei
- Cryptocarya alba
- Cryptocarya ampla
- Cryptocarya amygdalina
- Cryptocarya angulata
- Cryptocarya aschersoniana
- Cryptocarya aureosericea
- Cryptocarya bamagana
- Cryptocarya beddomei
- Cryptocarya bellendenkerana
- Cryptocarya bhutanica
- Cryptocarya bidwillii
- Cryptocarya brassii
- Cryptocarya cagayanensis
- Cryptocarya calcicola
- Cryptocarya chinensis
- Cryptocarya chingii
- Cryptocarya clarksoniana
- Cryptocarya claudiana
- Cryptocarya cocosoides
- Cryptocarya concinna
- Cryptocarya corrugata
- Cryptocarya costata
- Cryptocarya crassifolia
- Cryptocarya cunninghamii
- Cryptocarya densiflora
- Cryptocarya depressa
- Cryptocarya diversifolia
- Cryptocarya endiandrifolia
- Cryptocarya enervis
- Cryptocarya erythroxylon
- Cryptocarya exfoliata
- Cryptocarya ferrea
- Cryptocarya foveolata
- Cryptocarya fusca
- Cryptocarya glaucescens
- Cryptocarya grandis
- Cryptocarya griffithiana
- Cryptocarya guianensis
- Cryptocarya hainanensis
- Cryptocarya hornei
- Cryptocarya hypospodia
- Cryptocarya idenburgensis
- Cryptocarya impressa
- Cryptocarya invasiorum
- Cryptocarya kamahar
- Cryptocarya kurzii
- Cryptocarya laevigata
- Cryptocarya latifolia
- Cryptocarya leucophylla
- Cryptocarya liebertiana
- Cryptocarya litoralis
- Cryptocarya lividula
- Cryptocarya macdonaldii
- Cryptocarya mackinnoniana
- Cryptocarya maclurei
- Cryptocarya mandioccana
- Cryptocarya meisneriana
- Cryptocarya melanocarpa
- Cryptocarya metcalfiana
- Cryptocarya micrantha
- Cryptocarya microneura
- Cryptocarya minutifolia
- Cryptocarya moschata
- Cryptocarya multinervis
- Cryptocarya multipaniculata
- Cryptocarya murrayi
- Cryptocarya nitens
- Cryptocarya oblata
- Cryptocarya obliqua
- Cryptocarya obovata
- Cryptocarya occidentalis
- Cryptocarya onoprienkoana
- Cryptocarya pleurosperma
- Cryptocarya pulchrinervia
- Cryptocarya putida
- Cryptocarya rhodosperma
- Cryptocarya riedeliana
- Cryptocarya rigida
- Cryptocarya rugulosa
- Cryptocarya saccharata
- Cryptocarya saligna
- Cryptocarya sclerophylla
- Cryptocarya smaragdina
- Cryptocarya strictifolia
- Cryptocarya sublanuginosa
- Cryptocarya subvelutina
- Cryptocarya teysmanniana
- Cryptocarya transvaalensis
- Cryptocarya triplinervis
- Cryptocarya tsangii
- Cryptocarya vulgaris
- Cryptocarya weinlandii
- Cryptocarya wightiana
- Cryptocarya woodii
- Damburneya ambigens
- Damburneya coriacea
- Damburneya cufodontisii
- Damburneya gentlei
- Damburneya longicaudata
- Damburneya martinicensis
- Damburneya nitida
- Damburneya patens
- Damburneya purpurea
- Damburneya salicifolia
- Damburneya salicina
- Damburneya umbrosa
- Dehaasia brachybotrys
- Dehaasia caesia
- Dehaasia cairocan
- Dehaasia candolleana
- Dehaasia corynantha
- Dehaasia cuneata
- Dehaasia firma
- Dehaasia incrassata
- Dehaasia kurzii
- Dehaasia lancifolia
- Dehaasia longipetiolata
- Dehaasia paradoxa
- Dehaasia pauciflora
- Dehaasia polyneura
- Dehaasia sumatrana
- Dehaasia tomentosa
- Dehaasia turfosa
- Dodecadenia grandiflora
- Endiandra acuminata
- Endiandra aggregata
- Endiandra beccariana
- Endiandra bessaphila
- Endiandra brassii
- Endiandra clemensii
- Endiandra collinsii
- Endiandra compressa
- Endiandra cowleyana
- Endiandra crassiflora
- Endiandra dichrophylla
- Endiandra dielsiana
- Endiandra discolor
- Endiandra elaeocarpa
- Endiandra elongata
- Endiandra firma
- Endiandra forbesii
- Endiandra fulva
- Endiandra gillespiei
- Endiandra glauca
- Endiandra grandifolia
- Endiandra hypotephra
- Endiandra immersa
- Endiandra impressicosta
- Endiandra insignis
- Endiandra kingiana
- Endiandra leptodendron
- Endiandra longipedicellata
- Endiandra luteola
- Endiandra macrophylla
- Endiandra maingayi
- Endiandra monothyra
- Endiandra montana
- Endiandra monticola
- Endiandra muelleri
- Endiandra papuana
- Endiandra pubens
- Endiandra reticulata
- Endiandra rubescens
- Endiandra sankeyana
- Endiandra sideroxylon
- Endiandra sieberi
- Endiandra virens
- Endiandra wolfei
- Endiandra xanthocarpa
- Endlicheria acuminata
- Endlicheria anomala
- Endlicheria arenosa
- Endlicheria arunciflora
- Endlicheria bracteata
- Endlicheria bracteolata
- Endlicheria browniana
- Endlicheria canescens
- Endlicheria chalisea
- Endlicheria colombiana
- Endlicheria dictifarinosa
- Endlicheria directonervia
- Endlicheria duotincta
- Endlicheria dysodantha
- Endlicheria formosa
- Endlicheria glomerata
- Endlicheria gracilis
- Endlicheria griseosericea
- Endlicheria klugii
- Endlicheria lorastemon
- Endlicheria macrophylla
- Endlicheria melinonii
- Endlicheria metallica
- Endlicheria mishuyacensis
- Endlicheria multiflora
- Endlicheria oreocola
- Endlicheria paniculata
- Endlicheria punctulata
- Endlicheria pyriformis
- Endlicheria reflectens
- Endlicheria robusta
- Endlicheria rubriflora
- Endlicheria ruforamula
- Endlicheria sericea
- Endlicheria sprucei
- Endlicheria szyszylowiczii
- Endlicheria tessmannii
- Endlicheria tschudyana
- Endlicheria verticillata
- Endlicheria williamsii
- Endlicheria xerampela
- Hypodaphnis zenkeri
- Iteadaphne caudata
- Kubitzkia macrantha
- Laurus azorica
- Laurus nobilis
- Licaria applanata
- Licaria armeniaca
- Licaria aurea
- Licaria bahiana
- Licaria brasiliensis
- Licaria campechiana
- Licaria cannella
- Licaria capitata
- Licaria chinanteca
- Licaria chrysophylla
- Licaria clarensis
- Licaria colombiana
- Licaria crassifolia
- Licaria debilis
- Licaria excelsa
- Licaria guianensis
- Licaria macrophylla
- Licaria martiniana
- Licaria misantlae
- Licaria pachycarpa
- Licaria parvifolia
- Licaria peckii
- Licaria polyphylla
- Licaria pucheri
- Licaria rodriguesii
- Licaria rufotomentosa
- Licaria subbullata
- Licaria triandra
- Licaria vernicosa
- Lindera aggregata
- Lindera akoensis
- Lindera angustifolia
- Lindera assamica
- Lindera benzoin
- Lindera caesia
- Lindera chienii
- Lindera chunii
- Lindera communis
- Lindera erythrocarpa
- Lindera floribunda
- Lindera foveolata
- Lindera fragrans
- Lindera glauca
- Lindera kariensis
- Lindera kwangtungensis
- Lindera latifolia
- Lindera limprichtii
- Lindera lucida
- Lindera megaphylla
- Lindera meissneri
- Lindera metcalfiana
- Lindera nacusua
- Lindera neesiana
- Lindera obtusiloba
- Lindera polyantha
- Lindera prattii
- Lindera pulcherrima
- Lindera racemosa
- Lindera reflexa
- Lindera reticulosa, synonym of Litsea cubeba var. cubeba
- Lindera rubronervia
- Lindera sericea
- Lindera spicata
- Lindera supracostata
- Lindera thomsonii
- Lindera tonkinensis
- Litsea accedens
- Litsea acuminata
- Litsea akoensis
- Litsea angulata
- Litsea artocarpifolia
- Litsea balansae
- Litsea baviensis
- Litsea bindoniana
- Litsea brachystachya
- Litsea breviumbellata
- Litsea calicaris
- Litsea castanea
- Litsea caulocarpa
- Litsea chewii
- Litsea connorsii
- Litsea cordata
- Litsea coreana
- Litsea costalis
- Litsea crassifolia
- Litsea cubeba
- Litsea diversifolia
- Litsea domarensis
- Litsea elliptica
- Litsea elongata
- Litsea erectinervia
- Litsea fawcettiana
- Litsea ferruginea
- Litsea fulva
- Litsea garciae
- Litsea glabrata
- Litsea glaucescens
- Litsea globularia
- Litsea glutinosa
- Litsea gongshanensis
- Litsea gracilipes
- Litsea grandifolia
- Litsea grandis
- Litsea greenmaniana
- Litsea guppyi
- Litsea hayatae
- Litsea hirsutissima
- Litsea hookeri
- Litsea hupehana
- Litsea hypophaea
- Litsea ichangensis
- Litsea insignis
- Litsea irianensis
- Litsea jaswirii
- Litsea johorensis
- Litsea kingii
- Litsea kobuskiana
- Litsea laeta
- Litsea lanceolata
- Litsea lancifolia
- Litsea lancilimba
- Litsea leefeana
- Litsea longistaminata
- Litsea luzonica
- Litsea machilifolia
- Litsea magnifolia
- Litsea maingayi
- Litsea mappacea
- Litsea martabanica
- Litsea mellifera
- Litsea mollis
- Litsea monopetala
- Litsea morrisonensis
- Litsea moupinensis
- Litsea myristicifolia
- Litsea noronhae
- Litsea palmatinervia
- Litsea pedunculata
- Litsea pickeringii
- Litsea pierrei
- Litsea populifolia
- Litsea pseudoelongata
- Litsea pungens
- Litsea quercoides
- Litsea resinosa
- Litsea reticulata
- Litsea robusta
- Litsea rotundifolia
- Litsea rubescens
- Litsea rubicunda
- Litsea salicifolia
- Litsea semecarpifolia
- Litsea sericea
- Litsea sessiliflora
- Litsea spathacea
- Litsea subcoriacea
- Litsea suberosa
- Litsea subumbelliflora
- Litsea timoriana
- Litsea tomentosa
- Litsea triflora
- Litsea tsinlingensis
- Litsea umbellata
- Litsea variabilis
- Litsea veitchiana
- Litsea verticillata
- Litsea vitiana
- Litsea wilsonii
- Litsea wrayi, synonym of Litsea accedens var. accedens
- Litsea yunnanensis
- Machilus balansae
- Machilus bonii
- Machilus boninensis
- Machilus breviflora
- Machilus calcicola
- Machilus cavaleriei
- Machilus chekiangensis
- Machilus chinensis
- Machilus cicatricosus
- Machilus clarkeanus
- Machilus decursinervis
- Machilus duthiei
- Machilus glaucescens
- Machilus grijsii
- Machilus kobu
- Machilus kurzii
- Machilus kwangtungensis
- Machilus leptophylla
- Machilus litseifolia
- Machilus montana
- Machilus obovatifolia
- Machilus odoratissimus
- Machilus oreophila
- Machilus pauhoi
- Machilus philippinensis
- Machilus phoenicis
- Machilus rehderi
- Machilus robusta
- Machilus salicina
- Machilus shweliensis
- Machilus thunbergii
- Machilus velutinus
- Machilus versicolora
- Machilus viridis
- Machilus yunnanensis
- Machilus zuihoensis
- Mespilodaphne cymbarum
- Mespilodaphne quixos
- Mezilaurus introrsa
- Mezilaurus lindaviana
- Mezilaurus sprucei
- Mezilaurus synandra
- Mezilaurus triunca
- Nectandra acuminata
- Nectandra acutifolia
- Nectandra amazonum
- Nectandra angusta
- Nectandra angustifolia
- Nectandra canescens
- Nectandra cissiflora
- Nectandra crassiloba
- Nectandra cuneatocordata
- Nectandra cuspidata
- Nectandra debilis
- Nectandra discolor
- Nectandra gardneri
- Nectandra globosa
- Nectandra gracilis
- Nectandra guadaripo
- Nectandra hihua
- Nectandra lanceolata
- Nectandra latissima
- Nectandra laurel
- Nectandra leucantha
- Nectandra lineata
- Nectandra lineatifolia
- Nectandra maguireana
- Nectandra matthewsii
- Nectandra maynensis
- Nectandra megapotamica
- Nectandra membranacea
- Nectandra minima, synonym of Damburneya minima
- Nectandra nitidula
- Nectandra obtusata
- Nectandra olida
- Nectandra oppositifolia
- Nectandra paucinervia
- Nectandra pearcei
- Nectandra pichurim
- Nectandra psammophila
- Nectandra puberula
- Nectandra pulverulenta
- Nectandra reticulata
- Nectandra riparia
- Nectandra sanguinea
- Nectandra turbacensis
- Nectandra viburnoides
- Nectandra warmingii
- Neocinnamomum caudatum
- Neocinnamomum delavayi
- Neocinnamomum fargesii
- Neocinnamomum lecomtei
- Neocinnamomum mekongense
- Neolitsea acuminatissima
- Neolitsea alongensis
- Neolitsea aurata
- Neolitsea australiensis
- Neolitsea brassii
- Neolitsea brevipes
- Neolitsea buisanensis
- Neolitsea cambodiana
- Neolitsea cassia
- Neolitsea cassiifolia
- Neolitsea chui
- Neolitsea confertifolia
- Neolitsea cuipala
- Neolitsea dealbata
- Neolitsea elaeocarpa
- Neolitsea ellipsoidea
- Neolitsea foliosa
- Neolitsea homilantha
- Neolitsea javanica
- Neolitsea konishii
- Neolitsea latifolia
- Neolitsea levinei
- Neolitsea longipedicellata
- Neolitsea pallens
- Neolitsea parvigemma
- Neolitsea phanerophlebia
- Neolitsea polycarpa
- Neolitsea pulchella
- Neolitsea sericea
- Neolitsea sutchuanensis
- Neolitsea variabillima
- Neolitsea velutina
- Neolitsea villosa
- Neolitsea wushanica
- Neolitsea zeylanica
- Nothaphoebe havilandii
- Nothaphoebe heterophylla
- Nothaphoebe kingiana
- Nothaphoebe konishii
- Nothaphoebe panduriformis
- Nothaphoebe umbelliflora
- Ocotea aciphylla
- Ocotea acutangula
- Ocotea acutifolia
- Ocotea adela
- Ocotea adenotrachelium
- Ocotea alata
- Ocotea albopunctulata
- Ocotea amazonica
- Ocotea argentea
- Ocotea argyrophylla
- Ocotea atirrensis
- Ocotea atrata
- Ocotea aurantiodora
- Ocotea auriculata
- Ocotea austinii
- Ocotea beekmanii
- Ocotea benthamiana
- Ocotea bernoulliana
- Ocotea bissei
- Ocotea bofo
- Ocotea boissieriana
- Ocotea botrantha
- Ocotea bourgeauviana
- Ocotea brachybotrya
- Ocotea brenesii
- Ocotea camphoromoea
- Ocotea canaliculata
- Ocotea carabobensis
- Ocotea ceanothifolia
- Ocotea celastroides
- Ocotea chiapensis
- Ocotea cinerea
- Ocotea cissiflora
- Ocotea corymbosa
- Ocotea cowaniana
- Ocotea cujumary
- Ocotea cuneata
- Ocotea cuneifolia
- Ocotea cymosa
- Ocotea debilis
- Ocotea deflexa
- Ocotea delicata
- Ocotea dendrodaphne
- Ocotea densiflora
- Ocotea dentata
- Ocotea diffusa
- Ocotea diospyrifolia
- Ocotea discrepens
- Ocotea dispersa
- Ocotea divaricata
- Ocotea duidensis
- Ocotea effusa
- Ocotea ekmanii
- Ocotea elliptica
- Ocotea endresiana
- Ocotea erectifolia
- Ocotea esmeraldana
- Ocotea fasciculata
- Ocotea floribunda
- Ocotea foeniculacea
- Ocotea foetens
- Ocotea frondosa
- Ocotea gabonensis
- Ocotea gardneri
- Ocotea glauca
- Ocotea glaucosericea
- Ocotea glaziovii
- Ocotea glomerata
- Ocotea gomezii
- Ocotea gracilis
- Ocotea grayi
- Ocotea guatemalensis
- Ocotea guianensis
- Ocotea hartshorniana
- Ocotea heterochroma
- Ocotea heydeana
- Ocotea indecora
- Ocotea insignis
- Ocotea insularis
- Ocotea javitensis
- Ocotea jorge-escobarii
- Ocotea julianii
- Ocotea karsteniana
- Ocotea laetevirens
- Ocotea lanata
- Ocotea lancifolia
- Ocotea langsdorffii
- Ocotea laticostata
- Ocotea lenitae
- Ocotea leptobotra
- Ocotea leucoxylon
- Ocotea liesneri
- Ocotea lobbii
- Ocotea longifolia
- Ocotea macrophylla
- Ocotea macropoda
- Ocotea magnilimba
- Ocotea mandioccana
- Ocotea matogrossensis
- Ocotea meziana
- Ocotea microbotrys
- Ocotea microneura
- Ocotea minarum
- Ocotea minor
- Ocotea mollifolia
- Ocotea montana
- Ocotea myriantha
- Ocotea neblinae
- Ocotea nectandrifolia
- Ocotea neesiana
- Ocotea nigra
- Ocotea nigrescens
- Ocotea nilssonii
- Ocotea nitida
- Ocotea notata
- Ocotea nunesiana
- Ocotea nutans
- Ocotea obliqua
- Ocotea oblonga
- Ocotea obovata
- Ocotea olivacea
- Ocotea oppositifolia
- Ocotea ovalifolia
- Ocotea pacifica
- Ocotea paranapiacabensis
- Ocotea pauciflora
- Ocotea pentagona
- Ocotea percoriacea
- Ocotea percurrens
- Ocotea platyphylla
- Ocotea polyantha
- Ocotea pomaderroides
- Ocotea praetermissa
- Ocotea prolifera
- Ocotea pseudopalmana
- Ocotea puberula
- Ocotea pulchella
- Ocotea pulchra
- Ocotea pullifolia
- Ocotea purpurea
- Ocotea reticularis
- Ocotea revoluta
- Ocotea rhodophylla
- Ocotea rubriflora
- Ocotea rubrinervis
- Ocotea rufa
- Ocotea sanariapensis
- Ocotea sauroderma
- Ocotea scabrella
- Ocotea schomburgkiana
- Ocotea sinuata
- Ocotea splendens
- Ocotea stenoneura
- Ocotea subrutilans
- Ocotea subterminalis
- Ocotea tampicensis
- Ocotea teleiandra
- Ocotea tenella
- Ocotea tenera
- Ocotea tenuiflora
- Ocotea tessmannii
- Ocotea tillettsiana
- Ocotea tomentella
- Ocotea tubulosa
- Ocotea urbaniana
- Ocotea valerioana
- Ocotea valerioides
- Ocotea velutina
- Ocotea venosa
- Ocotea venulosa
- Ocotea veraguensis
- Ocotea villosa
- Ocotea whitei
- Ocotea wrightii
- Ocotea wurdackiana
- Ocotea xanthocalyx
- Ocotea yutajensis
- Paraia bracteata
- Parasassafras confertiflora
- Persea alba
- Persea americana, avocado
- Persea areolatocostae
- Persea aurata
- Persea bernardii
- Persea bootanica
- Persea caerulea
- Persea caesia
- Persea cuneata
- Persea fastigiata
- Persea fulva
- Persea gamblei
- Persea grandiflora
- Persea haenkeana
- Persea hexanthera
- Persea hypoleuca
- Persea indica
- Persea krugii
- Persea liebmannii
- Persea lingue
- Persea major
- Persea mutisii
- Persea nivea
- Persea perseiphylla
- Persea peruviana
- Persea povedae
- Persea pseudofasciculata
- Persea pyrifolia, synonym of Persea willdenovii
- Persea rigens
- Persea rufotomentosa
- Persea ruizii
- Persea sphaerocarpa
- Persea splendens
- Persea subcordata
- Persea venosa
- Persea vesticula
- Phoebe attenuata
- Phoebe calcarea
- Phoebe cathia
- Phoebe cavaleriei
- Phoebe formosana
- Phoebe grandis
- Phoebe hunanensis
- Phoebe laevis
- Phoebe lanceolata
- Phoebe legendrei
- Phoebe lucida
- Phoebe neurantha
- Phoebe neuranthoides
- Phoebe pallida
- Phoebe paniculata
- Phoebe sheareri
- Phoebe sterculioides
- Phoebe tavoyana
- Phoebe wightii
- Pleurothyrium bifidum
- Pleurothyrium cinereum
- Pleurothyrium costanense
- Pleurothyrium crassitepalum
- Pleurothyrium cuneifolium
- Pleurothyrium glabritepalum
- Pleurothyrium grandiflorum
- Pleurothyrium insigne
- Pleurothyrium intermedium
- Pleurothyrium marginale
- Pleurothyrium panurense
- Pleurothyrium parviflorum
- Pleurothyrium poeppigii
- Pleurothyrium trianae
- Pleurothyrium vasquezii
- Potameia confluens
- Potameia thouarsii
- Potoxylon melagangai
- Rhodostemonodaphne crenaticupula
- Rhodostemonodaphne elephantopus
- Rhodostemonodaphne grandis
- Rhodostemonodaphne juruensis
- Rhodostemonodaphne kunthiana
- Rhodostemonodaphne laxa
- Rhodostemonodaphne licanioides
- Rhodostemonodaphne macrocalyx
- Rhodostemonodaphne mirecolorata
- Rhodostemonodaphne morii
- Rhodostemonodaphne penduliflora
- Rhodostemonodaphne peneia
- Rhodostemonodaphne praeclara
- Rhodostemonodaphne revolutifolia
- Rhodostemonodaphne rufovirgata
- Rhodostemonodaphne saulensis
- Rhodostemonodaphne scandens
- Rhodostemonodaphne steyermarkiana
- Sassafras albidum
- Sassafras tzumu
- Sextonia rubra
- Systemonodaphne geminiflora
- Umbellularia californica
- Urbanodendron verrucosum

==== Monimiaceae ====
Species

- Decarydendron ranomafanensis
- Ephippiandra madagascariensis
- Ephippiandra masoalensis
- Ephippiandra perrieri
- Hedycarya arborea
- Hedycarya dorstenioides
- Hedycarya loxocarya
- Kibara coriacea
- Kibaropsis caledonica
- Levieria acuminata
- Levieria montana
- Levieria squarrosa
- Macropeplus ligustrinus
- Macrotorus utriculatus
- Matthaea sancta
- Mollinedia boliviensis
- Mollinedia butleriana
- Mollinedia clavigera
- Mollinedia costaricensis
- Mollinedia elegans
- Mollinedia engleriana
- Mollinedia killipii
- Mollinedia lanceolata
- Mollinedia longifolia
- Mollinedia oligantha
- Mollinedia ovata
- Mollinedia pachysandra
- Mollinedia repanda
- Mollinedia schottiana
- Mollinedia tomentosa
- Mollinedia triflora
- Mollinedia uleana
- Mollinedia viridiflora
- Mollinedia widgrenii
- Peumus boldus
- Steganthera hirsuta
- Steganthera laxiflora
- Steganthera macooraia
- Steganthera salomonensis
- Tambourissa castri-delphini
- Tambourissa hildebrandtii
- Tambourissa humbertii
- Tambourissa purpurea
- Tambourissa religiosa
- Tambourissa thouvenotii
- Tambourissa trichophylla
- Wilkiea macrophylla
- Xymalos monospora

==== Siparunaceae ====
- Glossocalyx longicuspis
- Siparuna aspera
- Siparuna calantha
- Siparuna cervicornis
- Siparuna conica
- Siparuna cristata
- Siparuna croatii
- Siparuna cuspidata
- Siparuna cymosa
- Siparuna decipiens
- Siparuna echinata
- Siparuna gentryana
- Siparuna gesnerioides
- Siparuna gigantotepala
- Siparuna glycycarpa
- Siparuna grandiflora
- Siparuna guajalitensis
- Siparuna guianensis
- Siparuna harlingii
- Siparuna krukovii
- Siparuna laurifolia
- Siparuna lepidota
- Siparuna macrotepala
- Siparuna mutisii
- Siparuna obstipa
- Siparuna pachyantha
- Siparuna pauciflora
- Siparuna petiolaris
- Siparuna pilosolepidota
- Siparuna poeppigii
- Siparuna schimpffii
- Siparuna sessiliflora
- Siparuna stellulata
- Siparuna subinodora
- Siparuna thecaphora
- Siparuna tomentosa

=== Magnoliales ===
==== Annonaceae ====
Species

- Alphonsea boniana
- Alphonsea elliptica
- Alphonsea javanica
- Alphonsea kinabaluensis
- Alphonsea lutea
- Alphonsea maingayi
- Alphonsea mollis
- Alphonsea siamensis
- Ambavia gerrardii
- Anaxagorea acuminata
- Anaxagorea allenii
- Anaxagorea angustifolia
- Anaxagorea brachycarpa
- Anaxagorea brevipes
- Anaxagorea crassipetala
- Anaxagorea dolichocarpa
- Anaxagorea guatemalensis
- Anaxagorea javanica
- Anaxagorea luzonensis
- Anaxagorea manausensis
- Anaxagorea petiolata
- Anaxagorea phaeocarpa
- Anaxagorea prinoides
- Anaxagorea rufa
- Anaxagorea silvatica
- Annickia affinis
- Annickia ambigua
- Annickia chlorantha
- Annickia letestui
- Annickia pilosa
- Annickia polycarpa
- Annona acuminata
- Annona acutiflora
- Annona amazonica
- Annona ambotay
- Annona andicola
- Annona atabapensis
- Annona aurantiaca
- Annona bahiensis
- Annona bullata
- Annona cacans
- Annona centrantha
- Annona cherimola
- Annona cherimolioides
- Annona cordifolia
- Annona corniflora
- Annona crassiflora
- Annona cuspidata
- Annona danforthii
- Annona deminuta
- Annona densicoma
- Annona dioica
- Annona dolabripetala
- Annona dolichopetala
- Annona dolichophylla
- Annona duckei
- Annona echinata
- Annona edulis
- Annona elliptica
- Annona emarginata
- Annona excellens
- Annona exsucca
- Annona fendleri
- Annona foetida
- Annona glabra
- Annona haematantha
- Annona hayesii
- Annona helosioides
- Annona herzogii
- Annona holosericea
- Annona hypoglauca
- Annona insignis
- Annona jahnii
- Annona jucunda
- Annona leptopetala
- Annona liebmanniana
- Annona macroprophyllata
- Annona marítima
- Annona montana
- Annona monticola
- Annona mucosa
- Annona muricata
- Annona neglecta
- Annona neoinsignis
- Annona neosalicifolia
- Annona neosericea
- Annona neoulei
- Annona nitida
- Annona nutans
- Annona oxapampae
- Annona paludosa
- Annona papilionella
- Annona pittieri
- Annona purpurea
- Annona quinduensis
- Annona rensoniana
- Annona reticulata
- Annona rosei
- Annona rugulosa
- Annona salzmannii
- Annona senegalensis
- Annona sericea
- Annona spinescens
- Annona squamosa
- Annona sylvatica
- Annona symphyocarpa
- Annona tenuiflora
- Annona tomentosa
- Annona vepretorum
- Annona williamsii
- Anonidium floribundum
- Anonidium mannii
- Artabotrys brachypetalus
- Artabotrys modestus
- Artabotrys monteiroae
- Asimina obovata
- Asimina parviflora
- Asimina triloba
- Bocagea longepedunculata
- Bocageopsis canescens
- Bocageopsis mattogrossensis
- Bocageopsis multiflora
- Bocageopsis pleiosperma
- Brieya fasciculata
- Cananga brandisiana
- Cananga odorata
- Cardiopetalum calophyllum
- Cardiopetalum surinamense
- Cleistochlamys kirkii
- Cleistopholis glauca
- Cleistopholis patens
- Cleistopholis staudtii
- Cremastosperma brevipes
- Cremastosperma cauliflorum
- Cremastosperma confusum
- Cremastosperma gracilipes
- Cremastosperma leiophyllum
- Cremastosperma megalophyllum
- Cremastosperma microcarpum
- Cremastosperma monospermum
- Cremastosperma oblongum
- Cremastosperma pedunculatum
- Cyathocalyx sumatranus
- Cyathocalyx zeylanicus
- Cyathostemma vietnamense
- Cymbopetalum aequale
- Cymbopetalum baillonii
- Cymbopetalum brasiliense
- Cymbopetalum coriaceum
- Cymbopetalum costaricense
- Cymbopetalum lanugipetalum
- Cymbopetalum longipes
- Cymbopetalum loretoyacuense
- Cymbopetalum mayanum
- Cymbopetalum oppositiflorum
- Cymbopetalum penduliflorum
- Cymbopetalum rugulosum
- Cymbopetalum stenophyllum
- Cymbopetalum torulosum
- Dasymaschalon clusiflorum
- Dasymaschalon dasymaschalum
- Dasymaschalon glaucum
- Dasymaschalon rostratum
- Desmopsis bibracteata
- Desmopsis brachypoda
- Desmopsis columbiensis
- Desmopsis confusa
- Desmopsis costaricensis
- Desmopsis maxonii
- Desmopsis microcarpa
- Desmopsis narinensis
- Desmopsis nigrescens
- Desmopsis panamensis
- Desmopsis schippii
- Desmopsis stenopetala
- Desmopsis verrucipes
- Diclinanona calycina
- Diclinanona tessmannii
- Dielsiothamnus divaricatus
- Disepalum anomalum
- Disepalum coronatum
- Disepalum petelotii
- Disepalum plagioneurum
- Disepalum pulchrum
- Drepananthus biovulatus
- Drepananthus cauliflorus
- Drepananthus deltoideus
- Drepananthus filiformis
- Drepananthus havilandii
- Drepananthus kingii
- Drepananthus lucidus
- Drepananthus magnificus
- Drepananthus obtusifolius
- Drepananthus pahangensis
- Drepananthus petiolatus
- Drepananthus prunifer
- Drepananthus ramuliflorus
- Drepananthus vitiensis
- Duguetia antioquensis
- Duguetia argentea
- Duguetia asterotricha
- Duguetia barteri
- Duguetia cadaverica
- Duguetia calycina
- Duguetia cauliflora
- Duguetia chrysocarpa
- Duguetia confinis
- Duguetia confusa
- Duguetia dimorphopetala
- Duguetia echinophora
- Duguetia eximia
- Duguetia flagellaris
- Duguetia furfuracea
- Duguetia gardneriana
- Duguetia hadrantha
- Duguetia inconspicua
- Duguetia lanceolata
- Duguetia latifolia
- Duguetia lepidota
- Duguetia longicuspis
- Duguetia lucida
- Duguetia macrophylla
- Duguetia manausensis
- Duguetia marcgraviana
- Duguetia megalocarpa
- Duguetia moricandiana
- Duguetia neglecta
- Duguetia odorata
- Duguetia panamensis
- Duguetia paraensis
- Duguetia pauciflora
- Duguetia pycnastera
- Duguetia quitarensis
- Duguetia riedeliana
- Duguetia rigida
- Duguetia riparia
- Duguetia salicifolia
- Duguetia sessilis
- Duguetia spixiana
- Duguetia staudtii
- Duguetia stelechantha
- Duguetia stenantha
- Duguetia surinamensis
- Duguetia trunciflora
- Duguetia uniflora
- Duguetia vallicola
- Duguetia yeshidan
- Ephedranthus amazonicus
- Ephedranthus dimerus
- Ephedranthus guianensis
- Ephedranthus parviflorus
- Ephedranthus pisocarpus
- Fenerivia emarginata
- Fenerivia ghesquiereana
- Froesiodendron amazonicum
- Fusaea decurrens, synonym of Fusaea longifolia
- Fusaea longifolia
- Fusaea peruviana
- Goniothalamus angustifolius
- Goniothalamus australis
- Goniothalamus brevicuspis
- Goniothalamus bygravei
- Goniothalamus calcareus
- Goniothalamus cauliflorus
- Goniothalamus chinensis
- Goniothalamus coriaceus
- Goniothalamus curtisii
- Goniothalamus elmeri
- Goniothalamus fulvus
- Goniothalamus giganteus
- Goniothalamus grandiflorus
- Goniothalamus howii
- Goniothalamus macrophyllus
- Goniothalamus malayanus
- Goniothalamus monospermus
- Goniothalamus ridleyi
- Goniothalamus rongklanus
- Goniothalamus roseus
- Goniothalamus rufus
- Goniothalamus scortechinii
- Goniothalamus suaveolens
- Goniothalamus tapis
- Goniothalamus tapisoides
- Goniothalamus tenuifolius
- Goniothalamus tortilipetalus
- Goniothalamus velutinus
- Goniothalamus woodii
- Greenwayodendron gabonicum
- Greenwayodendron glabrum
- Greenwayodendron oliveri
- Greenwayodendron suaveolens
- Guatteria aeruginosa
- Guatteria alata
- Guatteria alta
- Guatteria amplifolia
- Guatteria argentea
- Guatteria atabapensis
- Guatteria australis
- Guatteria beckii
- Guatteria blainii
- Guatteria blepharophylla
- Guatteria campestris
- Guatteria candolleana
- Guatteria chiriquiensis
- Guatteria citriodora
- Guatteria confusa
- Guatteria conspicua
- Guatteria costaricensis
- Guatteria crassipes
- Guatteria cryandra
- Guatteria cuatrecasasii
- Guatteria cuscoensis
- Guatteria darienensis
- Guatteria decurrens
- Guatteria discolor
- Guatteria dolichopoda
- Guatteria duckeana
- Guatteria duodecima
- Guatteria dura
- Guatteria elata
- Guatteria elegantissima
- Guatteria ferruginea
- Guatteria flabellata
- Guatteria foliosa
- Guatteria fractiflexa
- Guatteria friesiana
- Guatteria goudotiana
- Guatteria griseifolia
- Guatteria guianensis
- Guatteria heteropetala
- Guatteria hirsuta
- Guatteria insculpta
- Guatteria intermedia
- Guatteria inundata
- Guatteria liesneri
- Guatteria longicuspis
- Guatteria lucens
- Guatteria macropus
- Guatteria maypurensis
- Guatteria megalophylla
- Guatteria minutiflora
- Guatteria modesta
- Guatteria monticola
- Guatteria oblongifolia
- Guatteria oligocarpa
- Guatteria oliviformis
- Guatteria oriximinae
- Guatteria ouregou
- Guatteria pacifica
- Guatteria paludosa
- Guatteria panamensis
- Guatteria pastazae
- Guatteria pittieri
- Guatteria pogonopus
- Guatteria pohliana
- Guatteria punctata
- Guatteria ramiflora
- Guatteria richardii
- Guatteria rigida
- Guatteria rotundata
- Guatteria rubiginosa
- Guatteria rubrinervis
- Guatteria rupestris
- Guatteria saffordiana
- Guatteria scalarinervia
- Guatteria scandens
- Guatteria schomburgkiana
- Guatteria scytophylla
- Guatteria sellowiana
- Guatteria sessilicarpa
- Guatteria slateri
- Guatteria stipitata
- Guatteria subsessilis
- Guatteria terminalis
- Guatteria tomentosa
- Guatteria trichocarpa
- Guatteria ucayalina
- Guatteria vallensis
- Guatteria venezuelana
- Guatteria verrucosa
- Guatteria villosissima
- Guatteria wachenheimii
- Hexalobus crispiflorus
- Hexalobus monopetalus
- Hexalobus salicifolius
- Hornschuchia bryotrophe
- Huberantha cerasoides
- Huberantha henrici
- Huberantha jenkinsii
- Huberantha korinti
- Huberantha loriformis
- Huberantha nitidissima
- Huberantha rumphii
- Huberantha vitiensis
- Isolona campanulata
- Isolona congolana
- Isolona cooperi
- Isolona dewevrei
- Isolona hexaloba
- Isolona thonneri
- Isolona zenkeri
- Klarobelia anomala
- Klarobelia candida
- Klarobelia cauliflora
- Klarobelia inundata
- Klarobelia pumila
- Lettowianthus stellatus
- Maasia glauca
- Maasia hypoleuca
- Maasia sumatrana
- Malmea dielsiana
- Malmea dimera
- Malmea manausensis
- Meiogyne bidwillii
- Meiogyne cylindrocarpa
- Meiogyne habrotricha
- Meiogyne heteropetala
- Meiogyne laddiana
- Meiogyne monosperma
- Meiogyne virgata
- Mezzettia parviflora
- Miliusa brahei
- Miliusa cuneata
- Miliusa eupoda
- Miliusa horsfieldii
- Miliusa indica
- Miliusa macropoda
- Miliusa sclerocarpa
- Miliusa sinensis
- Miliusa thorelii
- Miliusa tomentosa
- Miliusa traceyi
- Miliusa velutina
- Mischogyne elliotiana
- Mitrephora diversifolia
- Mitrephora glabra
- Mitrephora heyneana
- Mitrephora korthalsiana
- Mitrephora longipetala
- Mitrephora tomentosa
- Mitrephora vittata
- Monanthotaxis caffra
- Monanthotaxis fornicata
- Monanthotaxis obovata
- Monanthotaxis parvifolia
- Monanthotaxis trichocarpa
- Monocarpia kalimantanensis
- Monocarpia maingayi
- Monodora angolensis
- Monodora crispata
- Monodora globiflora
- Monodora grandidieri
- Monodora junodii
- Monodora laurentii
- Monodora myristica
- Monodora tenuifolia
- Monodora undulata
- Monoon acuminatum
- Monoon anomalum
- Monoon australe
- Monoon coffeoides
- Monoon congregatum
- Monoon fuscum
- Monoon hookerianum
- Monoon hypogaeum
- Monoon lateriflorum
- Monoon longifolium
- Monoon longipes
- Monoon membranifolium
- Monoon michaelii
- Monoon pachypetalum
- Monoon paradoxum
- Monoon polycarpum
- Monoon simiarum
- Monoon xanthopetalum
- Mosannona depressa
- Mosannona discolor
- Mosannona garwoodiae
- Mosannona hypoglauca
- Mosannona papillosa
- Mosannona parva
- Mosannona raimondii
- Neo-uvaria acuminatissima
- Neostenanthera gabonensis
- Neostenanthera hamata
- Neostenanthera myristicifolia
- Neostenanthera robsonii
- Onychopetalum amazonicum
- Onychopetalum periquino
- Orophea celebica
- Orophea corymbosa
- Orophea creaghii
- Orophea cuneiformis
- Orophea hastata
- Orophea kostermansiana
- Orophea myriantha
- Orophea polycarpa
- Orophea trigyna
- Oxandra asbeckii
- Oxandra espintana
- Oxandra euneura
- Oxandra krukoffii
- Oxandra lanceolata
- Oxandra laurifolia
- Oxandra leucodermis
- Oxandra longipetala
- Oxandra martiana
- Oxandra mediocris
- Oxandra panamensis
- Oxandra polyantha
- Oxandra reticulata
- Oxandra riedeliana
- Oxandra sessiliflora
- Oxandra venezuelana
- Oxandra xylopioides
- Phaeanthus ophthalmicus
- Phaeanthus splendens
- Piptostigma fugax
- Piptostigma macranthum
- Piptostigma mayndongtsaeanum
- Piptostigma mortehanii
- Piptostigma multinervium
- Piptostigma pilosum
- Polyalthia bullata
- Polyalthia cauliflora
- Polyalthia charitopoda
- Polyalthia chrysotricha
- Polyalthia cinnamomea
- Polyalthia dictyoneura
- Polyalthia flagellaris
- Polyalthia gracilicolumnaris
- Polyalthia igniflora
- Polyalthia lateritia
- Polyalthia microtus
- Polyalthia motleyana
- Polyalthia myristica
- Polyalthia obliqua
- Polyalthia polyphlebia
- Polyalthia stenopetala
- Polyalthia suberosa
- Polyalthia watui
- Polyceratocarpus gossweileri
- Polyceratocarpus parviflorus
- Popowia fusca
- Popowia hirta
- Popowia odoardi
- Popowia pisocarpa
- Popowia tomentosa
- Popowia velutina
- Porcelia macrocarpa
- Porcelia mediocris
- Porcelia nitidifolia
- Porcelia ponderosa
- Porcelia venezuelensis
- Pseudomalmea boyacana
- Pseudomalmea diclina
- Pseudoxandra cuspidata
- Pseudoxandra leiophylla
- Pseudoxandra longipes
- Pseudoxandra lucida, synonym of Pseudoxandra laevigata
- Pseudoxandra obscurinervis
- Pseudoxandra pacifica
- Pseudoxandra polyphleba
- Pseuduvaria borneensis
- Pseuduvaria bruneiensis
- Pseuduvaria froggattii
- Pseuduvaria macrophylla
- Pseuduvaria pamattonis
- Pseuduvaria reticulata
- Pseuduvaria rugosa
- Pseuduvaria setosa
- Pseuduvaria trimera
- Ruizodendron ovale
- Sageraea lanceolata
- Sageraea laurina
- Sapranthus campechianus
- Sapranthus microcarpus
- Sapranthus palanga
- Sapranthus violaceus
- Sapranthus viridiflorus
- Sphaerocoryne gracilis
- Stelechocarpus cauliflorus
- Stelechocarpus expansus
- Tetrameranthus duckei
- Tetrameranthus laomae
- Trigynaea caudata
- Trigynaea cinnamomea
- Trigynaea duckei
- Trivalvaria costata
- Trivalvaria macrophylla
- Trivalvaria nervosa
- Unonopsis aviceps
- Unonopsis bahiensis
- Unonopsis bullata
- Unonopsis colombiana
- Unonopsis costaricensis
- Unonopsis duckei
- Unonopsis elegantissima
- Unonopsis floribunda
- Unonopsis glaucopetala
- Unonopsis guatterioides
- Unonopsis pacifica
- Unonopsis panamensis
- Unonopsis perrottetii
- Unonopsis peruviana
- Unonopsis pittieri
- Unonopsis rufescens
- Unonopsis spectabilis
- Unonopsis stipitata
- Unonopsis storkii
- Unonopsis theobromifolia
- Unonopsis velutina, synonym of Unonopsis spectabilis
- Unonopsis veneficiorum
- Uvaria acuminata
- Uvaria afzelii
- Uvaria angolensis
- Uvaria caffra
- Uvaria chamae
- Uvaria laurentii
- Uvaria leptocladon
- Uvaria lucida
- Uvaria siamensis
- Uvaria sofa
- Uvariastrum germainii
- Uvariastrum hexaloboides
- Uvariastrum insculptum
- Uvariastrum pierreanum
- Uvariastrum zenkeri
- Uvariodendron calophyllum
- Uvariodendron connivens
- Uvariodendron fuscum
- Uvariodendron molundense
- Uvariodendron schmidtii
- Uvariopsis bakeriana
- Uvariopsis congensis
- Uvariopsis congolana
- Uvariopsis dioica
- Uvariopsis guineensis
- Uvariopsis solheidii
- Uvariopsis tripetala, synonym of Dennettia tripetala
- Xylopia acutiflora
- Xylopia aethiopica
- Xylopia amazonica
- Xylopia aromatica
- Xylopia aurantiiodora
- Xylopia barbata
- Xylopia benthamii
- Xylopia bocatorena
- Xylopia buxifolia
- Xylopia calophylla
- Xylopia cayennensis
- Xylopia championii
- Xylopia columbiana
- Xylopia crinita
- Xylopia cupularis
- Xylopia cuspidata
- Xylopia dehiscens
- Xylopia discreta
- Xylopia elliotii
- Xylopia emarginata
- Xylopia excellens
- Xylopia ferruginea
- Xylopia flamignii
- Xylopia frutescens
- Xylopia fusca
- Xylopia gracilipes
- Xylopia heterotricha
- Xylopia holtzii
- Xylopia humblotiana
- Xylopia hypolampra
- Xylopia katangensis
- Xylopia keniensis
- Xylopia laevigata
- Xylopia langsdorfiana
- Xylopia le-testui
- Xylopia ligustrifolia
- Xylopia longipetala
- Xylopia maccreae
- Xylopia macrantha
- Xylopia magna
- Xylopia malayana
- Xylopia micans
- Xylopia multiflora
- Xylopia nervosa
- Xylopia nitida
- Xylopia ochrantha
- Xylopia odoratissima
- Xylopia pacifica
- Xylopia papuana
- Xylopia parviflora
- Xylopia peekelii
- Xylopia polyantha
- Xylopia pulcherrima
- Xylopia pynaertii
- Xylopia quintasii
- Xylopia roigii
- Xylopia rubescens
- Xylopia sericea
- Xylopia sericophylla
- Xylopia shirensis
- Xylopia spruceana
- Xylopia staudtii
- Xylopia subdehiscens
- Xylopia sumatrana
- Xylopia thomsonii
- Xylopia tomentosa
- Xylopia vielana
- Xylopia villosa
- Xylopia vitiensis
- Xylopia wilwerthii

Subspecies

- Artabotrys modestus subsp. macranthus
- Sphaerocoryne gracilis subsp. gracilis
- Uvaria lucida subsp. lucida
- Uvariodendron molundense var. molundense

==== Degeneriaceae ====
- Degeneria vitiensis

==== Eupomatiaceae ====
- Eupomatia barbata
- Eupomatia laurina

==== Himantandraceae ====
- Galbulimima belgraveana

==== Magnoliaceae ====
Species

- Liriodendron tulipifera, yellow poplar
- Magnolia acuminata, cucumber magnolia
- Magnolia amazonica
- Magnolia baillonii
- Magnolia betongensis
- Magnolia biondii
- Magnolia campbellii, Campbell's magnolia
- Magnolia carsonii
- Magnolia cathcartii
- Magnolia cavaleriei
- Magnolia champaca, champak
- Magnolia chapensis, prosperous music smiling tree
- Magnolia citrata
- Magnolia conifera
- Magnolia dandyi
- Magnolia delavayi
- Magnolia denudata
- Magnolia equatorialis
- Magnolia figo, banana magnolia
- Magnolia fordiana
- Magnolia foveolata
- Magnolia fraseri, Fraser's magnolia
- Magnolia globosa
- Magnolia grandiflora, southern magnolia
- Magnolia guatemalensis
- Magnolia hodgsonii
- Magnolia insignis
- Magnolia liliifera
- Magnolia macclurei
- Magnolia macrophylla, big-leaf magnolia
- Magnolia martinii
- Magnolia maudiae
- Magnolia mediocris
- Magnolia oblonga
- Magnolia obovata, Japanese big leaf magnolia
- Magnolia ovata
- Magnolia panamensis
- Magnolia persuaveolens
- Magnolia rimachii
- Magnolia salicifolia, willow leafed magnolia
- Magnolia siamensis
- Magnolia sieboldii
- Magnolia sprengeri
- Magnolia sumatrana
- Magnolia tripetala, umbrella magnolia
- Magnolia virginiana, sweet bay

Subspecies

- Magnolia persuaveolens subsp. rigida

Varieties

- Magnolia carsonii var. carsonii
- Magnolia fordiana var. fordiana

==== Myristicaceae ====
Species

- Brochoneura acuminata
- Coelocaryon preussii
- Compsoneura atopa
- Compsoneura capitellata
- Compsoneura claroensis
- Compsoneura cuatrecasasii
- Compsoneura debilis
- Compsoneura excelsa
- Compsoneura lapidiflora
- Compsoneura mexicana
- Compsoneura mutisii
- Compsoneura rigidifolia
- Compsoneura schultesiana
- Compsoneura sprucei
- Compsoneura trianae
- Compsoneura ulei
- Endocomia canarioides
- Endocomia macrocoma
- Endocomia rufirachis
- Gymnacranthera farquhariana
- Gymnacranthera forbesii
- Horsfieldia amygdalina
- Horsfieldia australiana
- Horsfieldia basifissa
- Horsfieldia borneensis
- Horsfieldia costulata
- Horsfieldia crassifolia
- Horsfieldia discolor
- Horsfieldia endertii
- Horsfieldia glabra
- Horsfieldia grandis
- Horsfieldia hellwigii
- Horsfieldia inflexa
- Horsfieldia irya
- Horsfieldia kingii
- Horsfieldia laevigata
- Horsfieldia laticostata
- Horsfieldia leptantha
- Horsfieldia moluccana
- Horsfieldia olens
- Horsfieldia pachycarpa
- Horsfieldia parviflora
- Horsfieldia penangiana
- Horsfieldia polyspherula
- Horsfieldia pulverulenta
- Horsfieldia punctatifolia
- Horsfieldia ridleyana
- Horsfieldia schlechteri
- Horsfieldia spicata
- Horsfieldia subtilis
- Horsfieldia superba
- Horsfieldia sylvestris
- Horsfieldia tomentosa
- Horsfieldia tuberculata
- Horsfieldia wallichii
- Horsfieldia whitmorei
- Iryanthera coriacea
- Iryanthera crassifolia
- Iryanthera elliptica
- Iryanthera hostmannii
- Iryanthera juruensis
- Iryanthera laevis
- Iryanthera lancifolia
- Iryanthera macrophylla
- Iryanthera megistophylla
- Iryanthera obovata
- Iryanthera olacoides
- Iryanthera paradoxa
- Iryanthera paraensis
- Iryanthera polyneura
- Iryanthera tessmannii
- Iryanthera tricornis
- Knema andamanica
- Knema angustifolia
- Knema attenuata
- Knema cinerea
- Knema conferta
- Knema curtisii
- Knema elegans
- Knema elmeri
- Knema erratica
- Knema furfuracea
- Knema galeata
- Knema glauca
- Knema glaucescens
- Knema globularia
- Knema glomerata
- Knema intermedia
- Knema kinabaluensis
- Knema korthalsii
- Knema kunstleri
- Knema latericia
- Knema latifolia
- Knema laurina
- Knema lenta
- Knema linguiformis
- Knema linifolia
- Knema lunduensis
- Knema luteola
- Knema malayana
- Knema mandaharan
- Knema membranifolia
- Knema minima
- Knema mogeana
- Knema pallens
- Knema pectinata
- Knema pulchra
- Knema rubens
- Knema scortechinii
- Knema stenophylla
- Knema sumatrana
- Knema tenuinervia
- Knema tomentella
- Knema woodii
- Mauloutchia chapelieri
- Mauloutchia humblotii
- Myristica beccarii
- Myristica beddomei
- Myristica bialata
- Myristica bifurcata
- Myristica borneensis
- Myristica buchneriana
- Myristica castaneifolia
- Myristica chartacea
- Myristica chrysophylla
- Myristica cinnamomea
- Myristica clemensii
- Myristica cornutiflora
- Myristica crassipes
- Myristica cucullata
- Myristica cumingii
- Myristica duplopunctata
- Myristica elliptica
- Myristica fatua
- Myristica fissiflora
- Myristica fusca
- Myristica gillespieana
- Myristica globosa
- Myristica grandifolia
- Myristica guatteriifolia
- Myristica hollrungii
- Myristica hypargyraea
- Myristica impressa
- Myristica iners
- Myristica ingrata
- Myristica insipida
- Myristica inutilis
- Myristica kalkmanii
- Myristica kjellbergii
- Myristica lancifolia
- Myristica lepidota
- Myristica macrantha
- Myristica malaccensis
- Myristica maxima
- Myristica mediovibex
- Myristica perlaevis
- Myristica philippensis
- Myristica sangowoensis
- Myristica sangowoensis
- Myristica schleinitzii
- Myristica scripta
- Myristica simiarum
- Myristica smythiesii
- Myristica sphaerosperma
- Myristica subalulata
- Myristica subcordata
- Myristica succedanea
- Myristica sulcata
- Myristica tamrauensis
- Myristica tristis
- Myristica tubiflora
- Myristica umbrosa
- Myristica undulatifolia
- Myristica velutina
- Myristica villosa
- Myristica warburgii
- Osteophloeum platyspermum
- Otoba acuminata
- Otoba glycycarpa
- Otoba gordoniifolia
- Otoba gracilipes
- Otoba latialata
- Otoba lehmannii
- Otoba novogranatensis
- Pycnanthus angolensis
- Scyphocephalium mannii
- Scyphocephalium ochocoa
- Staudtia kamerunensis
- Virola caducifolia
- Virola calophylla
- Virola carinata
- Virola coelhoi
- Virola decorticans
- Virola dixonii
- Virola duckei
- Virola elongata
- Virola flexuosa
- Virola gardneri
- Virola guatemalensis
- Virola koschnyi
- Virola kwatae
- Virola loretensis
- Virola macrocarpa
- Virola marleneae
- Virola megacarpa
- Virola michelii
- Virola mollissima
- Virola montana
- Virola multiflora
- Virola multinervia
- Virola nobilis
- Virola obovata
- Virola officinalis
- Virola otobifolia
- Virola pavonis
- Virola peruviana
- Virola schultesii
- Virola sebifera
- Virola surinamensis
- Virola theiodora
- Virola venosa

Subspecies

- Endocomia macrocoma subsp. macrocoma
- Knema kunstleri subsp. kunstleri
- Knema latericia subsp. albifolia
- Knema latericia subsp. ridleyi
- Knema oblongata subsp. oblongata
- Knema stenophylla subsp. longipedicellata
- Knema stenophylla subsp. stenophylla
- Myristica fatua subsp. fatua
- Myristica fissiflora subsp. kostermansii
- Myristica inutilis subsp. papuana
- Myristica inutilis subsp. platyphylla
- Myristica lancifolia subsp. lancifolia
- Myristica lancifolia subsp. montana
- Myristica tristis subsp. moluccana
- Myristica tristis subsp. tristis

Varieties

- Horsfieldia moluccana var. petiolaris
- Knema laurina var. heteropilis
- Knema laurina var. laurina
- Myristica bialata var. brevipila

=== Malpighiales ===
==== Calophyllaceae ====
- Calophyllum alboramulum
- Calophyllum andersonii
- Calophyllum aurantiacum
- Calophyllum banyengii
- Calophyllum biflorum
- Calophyllum blancoi
- Calophyllum brasiliense
- Calophyllum brassii
- Calophyllum canum
- Calophyllum cerasiferum
- Calophyllum clemensiorum
- Calophyllum costatum
- Calophyllum costulatum
- Calophyllum depressinervosum
- Calophyllum dioscurii
- Calophyllum dispar
- Calophyllum dryobalanoides
- Calophyllum euryphyllum
- Calophyllum ferrugineum
- Calophyllum garcinioides
- Calophyllum goniocarpum
- Calophyllum gracilipes
- Calophyllum griseum
- Calophyllum hosei
- Calophyllum humbertii
- Calophyllum incumbens
- Calophyllum inophyllum, Alexandrian laurel
- Calophyllum leptocladum
- Calophyllum leucocarpum
- Calophyllum longifolium
- Calophyllum macrocarpum
- Calophyllum membranaceum
- Calophyllum molle
- Calophyllum multitudinis
- Calophyllum neoebudicum
- Calophyllum nodosum
- Calophyllum obliquinervium
- Calophyllum pachyphyllum
- Calophyllum papuanum
- Calophyllum pauciflorum
- Calophyllum peekelii
- Calophyllum pisiferum
- Calophyllum pulcherrimum
- Calophyllum pyriforme
- Calophyllum recurvatum
- Calophyllum rigidum
- Calophyllum roseocostatum
- Calophyllum rubiginosum
- Calophyllum rufigemmatum
- Calophyllum rupicola
- Calophyllum sclerophyllum
- Calophyllum sil
- Calophyllum soulattri
- Calophyllum sundaicum
- Calophyllum symingtonianum
- Calophyllum tetrapterum
- Calophyllum teysmannii
- Calophyllum thorelii
- Calophyllum venulosum
- Calophyllum vexans
- Calophyllum vitiense
- Calophyllum wallichianum
- Calophyllum whitfordii
- Calophyllum woodii
- Caraipa ampla
- Caraipa antioquensis
- Caraipa densifolia
- Caraipa grandifolia
- Caraipa llanorum
- Caraipa longipedicellata
- Caraipa myrcioides
- Caraipa parvielliptica
- Caraipa parvifolia
- Caraipa punctulata
- Caraipa richardiana
- Caraipa savannarum
- Caraipa tereticaulis
- Caraipa tumescens
- Clusiella axillaris
- Clusiella macropetala
- Endodesmia calophylloides
- Haploclathra verticillata
- Kayea assamica
- Kayea beccariana
- Kayea ferruginea
- Kayea grandis
- Kayea lepidota
- Kayea parviflora
- Kayea racemosa
- Kielmeyera lathrophyton
- Kielmeyera membranacea
- Kielmeyera neglecta
- Kielmeyera petiolaris
- Kielmeyera speciosa
- Kielmeyera tomentosa
- Mahurea exstipulata
- Mammea acuminata
- Mammea africana
- Mammea harmandii
- Mammea immansueta
- Mammea odorata
- Mammea sessiliflora
- Mammea siamensis
- Mammea suriga
- Marila alternifolia
- Marila lactogena
- Marila laxiflora
- Marila macrophylla
- Marila micrantha
- Marila podantha
- Marila tomentosa
- Neotatea duidae
- Neotatea longifolia
- Poeciloneuron indicum

==== Chrysobalanaceae ====
- Acioa dolichopoda
- Acioa edulis
- Acioa guianensis
- Acioa longipendula
- Afrolicania elaeosperma
- Angelesia splendens
- Atuna cordata
- Atuna nannodes
- Atuna racemosa
- Chrysobalanus icaco
- Chrysobalanus prancei
- Cordillera platycalyx
- Couepia bracteosa
- Couepia cataractae
- Couepia chrysocalyx
- Couepia guianensis
- Couepia habrantha
- Couepia impressa
- Couepia krukovii
- Couepia latifolia
- Couepia macrophylla
- Couepia maguirei
- Couepia monteclarensis
- Couepia nutans
- Couepia obovata
- Couepia ovalifolia
- Couepia paraensis
- Couepia polyandra
- Couepia rankiniae
- Couepia robusta
- Couepia rufa
- Couepia sandwithii
- Couepia subcordata
- Couepia trapezioana
- Couepia ulei
- Couepia venosa
- Couepia williamsii
- Dactyladenia barteri
- Dactyladenia campestris
- Dactyladenia chevalieri
- Dactyladenia icondere
- Dactyladenia lehmbachii
- Dactyladenia letestui
- Dactyladenia pallescens
- Dactyladenia scabrifolia
- Dactyladenia staudtii
- Dactyladenia whytei
- Exellodendron barbatum
- Exellodendron cordatum
- Exellodendron coriaceum
- Gaulettia canescens
- Gaulettia canomensis
- Gaulettia cognata
- Gaulettia elata
- Gaulettia foveolata
- Gaulettia parillo
- Gaulettia racemosa
- Grangeria porosa
- Hirtella adenophora
- Hirtella americana
- Hirtella bahiensis
- Hirtella bicornis
- Hirtella brachystachya
- Hirtella bullata
- Hirtella burchellii
- Hirtella carbonaria
- Hirtella castillana
- Hirtella ciliata
- Hirtella davisii
- Hirtella deflexa
- Hirtella duckei
- Hirtella elongata
- Hirtella fasciculata
- Hirtella glabrata
- Hirtella glandulistipula
- Hirtella glandulosa
- Hirtella guainiae
- Hirtella guatemalensis
- Hirtella guyanensis
- Hirtella hebeclada
- Hirtella hispidula
- Hirtella latifolia
- Hirtella lemsii
- Hirtella liesneri
- Hirtella lightioides
- Hirtella longipedicellata
- Hirtella macrophylla
- Hirtella martiana
- Hirtella mucronata
- Hirtella mutisii
- Hirtella myrmecophila
- Hirtella paniculata
- Hirtella paraensis
- Hirtella physophora
- Hirtella pilosissima
- Hirtella punctillata
- Hirtella racemosa
- Hirtella rugosa
- Hirtella schultesii
- Hirtella silicea
- Hirtella sprucei
- Hirtella tentaculata
- Hirtella triandra
- Hirtella tubiflora
- Hirtella ulei
- Hirtella zanzibarica
- Hunga rhamnoides
- Hymenopus amapaensis
- Hymenopus arachnoideus
- Hymenopus caudatus
- Hymenopus divaricatus
- Hymenopus glabriflorus
- Hymenopus heteromorphus
- Hymenopus hirsutus
- Hymenopus krukovii
- Hymenopus laevigatus
- Hymenopus lasseri
- Hymenopus latistipulus
- Hymenopus macrophyllus
- Hymenopus occultans
- Hymenopus prismatocarpus
- Hymenopus reticulatus
- Kostermanthus heteropetalus
- Kostermanthus robustus
- Leptobalanus albiflorus
- Leptobalanus cardiophyllus
- Leptobalanus cuatrecasasii
- Leptobalanus cuspidatus
- Leptobalanus emarginatus
- Leptobalanus foveolatus
- Leptobalanus fuchsii
- Leptobalanus granvillei
- Leptobalanus jefensis
- Leptobalanus morii
- Leptobalanus persaudii
- Leptobalanus sclerophyllus
- Leptobalanus undulatus
- Leptobalanus wurdackii
- Licania affinis
- Licania alba
- Licania apetala
- Licania boyanii
- Licania canescens
- Licania cidii
- Licania cordata
- Licania coriacea
- Licania couepiifolia
- Licania cruegeriana
- Licania dealbata
- Licania densiflora
- Licania discolor
- Licania foldatsii
- Licania gardneri
- Licania glauca
- Licania gracilipes
- Licania harlingii
- Licania hebantha
- Licania hypoleuca
- Licania impressa
- Licania incana
- Licania intrapetiolaris
- Licania irwinii
- Licania kunthiana
- Licania lata
- Licania latifolia
- Licania laxiflora
- Licania leptostachya
- Licania littoralis
- Licania longistyla
- Licania majuscula
- Licania membranacea
- Licania micrantha
- Licania minuscula
- Licania mollis
- Licania nitida
- Licania octandra
- Licania orbicularis
- Licania pallida
- Licania parviflora
- Licania parvifolia
- Licania parvifructa
- Licania piresii
- Licania polita
- Licania riedelii
- Licania rufescens
- Licania savannarum
- Licania silvae
- Licania spicata
- Licania sprucei
- Licania stewardii
- Licania steyermarkii
- Licania subrotundata
- Licania triandra
- Licania urceolaris
- Licania vaupesiana
- Licania velata
- Magnistipula bimarsupiata
- Magnistipula butayei
- Magnistipula glaberrima
- Magnistipula tamenaka
- Magnistipula tessmannii
- Magnistipula zenkeri
- Maranthes aubrevillei
- Maranthes chrysophylla
- Maranthes corymbosa
- Maranthes gabunensis
- Maranthes glabra
- Maranthes panamensis
- Maranthes polyandra
- Maranthes robusta
- Microdesmia arborea
- Microdesmia rigida
- Moquilea angustata
- Moquilea boliviensis
- Moquilea brittoniana
- Moquilea celiae
- Moquilea chocoensis
- Moquilea dodsonii
- Moquilea durifolia
- Moquilea fasciculata
- Moquilea fritschii
- Moquilea gentryi
- Moquilea guianensis
- Moquilea jaramilloi
- Moquilea klugii
- Moquilea longipedicellata
- Moquilea longipetala
- Moquilea magnifructa
- Moquilea maritima
- Moquilea platypus
- Moquilea pyrifolia
- Moquilea salzmannii
- Moquilea subarachnophylla
- Moquilea tambopatensis
- Moquilea tomentosa
- Moquilea unguiculata
- Moquilea veneralensis
- Parastemon versteeghii
- Parinari anamensis
- Parinari brasiliensis
- Parinari campestris
- Parinari canarioides
- Parinari chocoensis
- Parinari congensis
- Parinari costata
- Parinari curatellifolia
- Parinari elmeri
- Parinari excelsa
- Parinari hypochrysea
- Parinari klugii
- Parinari littoralis
- Parinari montana
- Parinari nonda
- Parinari occidentalis
- Parinari pachyphylla
- Parinari papuana
- Parinari parilis
- Parinari rodolphii
- Parinari romeroi
- Parinari sprucei
- Parinariopsis licaniiflora

==== Clusiaceae ====
- Allanblackia floribunda
- Allanblackia stuhlmannii
- Arawakia weddelliana
- Chrysochlamys allenii
- Chrysochlamys alterninervia
- Chrysochlamys bracteolata
- Chrysochlamys colombiana
- Chrysochlamys croatii
- Chrysochlamys cuneata
- Chrysochlamys dependens
- Chrysochlamys eclipes
- Chrysochlamys floribunda
- Chrysochlamys glauca
- Chrysochlamys grandifolia
- Chrysochlamys laxa
- Chrysochlamys macrophylla
- Chrysochlamys membranacea
- Chrysochlamys myrcioides
- Chrysochlamys nicaraguensis
- Chrysochlamys psychotriifolia
- Chrysochlamys silvicola
- Chrysochlamys tenuifolia
- Chrysochlamys tenuis
- Chrysochlamys ulei
- Chrysochlamys weberbaueri
- Clusia alata
- Clusia amazonica
- Clusia androphora
- Clusia annularis
- Clusia articulata
- Clusia aymardii
- Clusia belizensis
- Clusia bernardoi
- Clusia brachycarpa
- Clusia brachystyla
- Clusia burle-marxii
- Clusia cajambrensis
- Clusia candelabrum
- Clusia caudata
- Clusia celiae
- Clusia centricupula
- Clusia cerroana
- Clusia chiribiquetensis
- Clusia clusioides
- Clusia cochiliformis
- Clusia cochlitheca
- Clusia coclensis
- Clusia colombiana
- Clusia columnaris
- Clusia congestiflora
- Clusia crassifolia
- Clusia crassipetiolata
- Clusia crenata
- Clusia criuva
- Clusia croatii
- Clusia cuneata
- Clusia cuniefolia
- Clusia cylindrica
- Clusia dardanoi
- Clusia decussata
- Clusia densinervia
- Clusia divaricata
- Clusia dixonii
- Clusia ducu
- Clusia ducuoides
- Clusia dukei
- Clusia elliptica
- Clusia ellipticifolia
- Clusia epiphytica
- Clusia elliptica
- Clusia fabiolae
- Clusia firmifolia
- Clusia flava
- Clusia flavida
- Clusia flaviflora
- Clusia fluminensis
- Clusia fockeana
- Clusia fructiangusta
- Clusia garcibarrigae
- Clusia glomerata
- Clusia grammadenioides
- Clusia grandiflora
- Clusia guatemalensis
- Clusia gundlachii
- Clusia hammeliana
- Clusia haughtii
- Clusia hilariana
- Clusia huberi
- Clusia hydrogera
- Clusia inesiana
- Clusia insignis
- Clusia lanceolata
- Clusia latifolia
- Clusia laurifolia
- Clusia laxiflora
- Clusia lechleri
- Clusia leprantha
- Clusia leptanthera
- Clusia liesneri
- Clusia lineata
- Clusia longistyla
- Clusia lopezii
- Clusia loranthacea
- Clusia loretensis
- Clusia lundellii
- Clusia macropoda
- Clusia magnifolia
- Clusia mamillata
- Clusia martiana
- Clusia massoniana
- Clusia melchiorii
- Clusia microstemon
- Clusia minor
- Clusia mituana
- Clusia mocoensis
- Clusia monantha
- Clusia multiflora
- Clusia myriandra
- Clusia myrsinites
- Clusia nemorosa
- Clusia neurophylla
- Clusia nigrolineata
- Clusia nutans
- Clusia obdeltifolia
- Clusia obovata
- Clusia octandra
- Clusia octopetala
- Clusia organensis
- Clusia orthoneura
- Clusia osseocarpa
- Clusia ovalis
- Clusia pallida
- Clusia palmana
- Clusia palmicida
- Clusia panapanari
- Clusia paralicola
- Clusia pavonii
- Clusia penduliflora
- Clusia pentandra
- Clusia polyantha
- Clusia popayenensis
- Clusia pseudomangle
- Clusia ptaritepuiensis
- Clusia pusilla
- Clusia quadrangula
- Clusia quadrata
- Clusia radicans
- Clusia renggerioides
- Clusia robusta
- Clusia rosea
- Clusia rotundata
- Clusia rotundifolia
- Clusia salvinii
- Clusia savannarum
- Clusia schomburgkiana
- Clusia schultesii
- Clusia scrobiculata
- Clusia sellowiana
- Clusia sipapoana
- Clusia spathulifolia
- Clusia sphaerocarpa
- Clusia stenophylla
- Clusia tabulamontana
- Clusia tenuifolia
- Clusia tetragona
- Clusia thurifera
- Clusia torresii
- Clusia triflora
- Clusia trochiformis
- Clusia uvitana
- Clusia valerioi
- Clusia veneralensis
- Clusia venulosa
- Clusia venusta
- Clusia viscida
- Clusia vittata
- Clusia weddelliana
- Dystovomita clusiifolia
- Dystovomita paniculata
- Garcinia acuminata
- Garcinia adinantha
- Garcinia amboinensis
- Garcinia andamanica
- Garcinia angustifolia
- Garcinia anomala
- Garcinia archboldiana
- Garcinia aristata
- Garcinia assugu
- Garcinia atroviridis
- Garcinia balica
- Garcinia bancana
- Garcinia beccarii
- Garcinia benthamiana
- Garcinia binucao
- Garcinia blumei
- Garcinia brasiliensis
- Garcinia brassii
- Garcinia brevipes
- Garcinia brevirostris
- Garcinia burkillii
- Garcinia calcicola
- Garcinia cantleyana
- Garcinia celebica
- Garcinia chapelieri
- Garcinia cowa
- Garcinia decipiens
- Garcinia diospyrifolia
- Garcinia dulcis
- Garcinia epunctata
- Garcinia fagraeoides
- Garcinia forbesii
- Garcinia fusca
- Garcinia gardneriana
- Garcinia gaudichaudii
- Garcinia gerrardii
- Garcinia gibbsiae
- Garcinia goudotiana
- Garcinia griffithii
- Garcinia guacopary
- Garcinia gummi-gutta
- Garcinia hanburyi
- Garcinia harmandii
- Garcinia havilandii
- Garcinia hendersoniana
- Garcinia hollrungii
- Garcinia hopii
- Garcinia humilis
- Garcinia hunsteinii
- Garcinia intermedia
- Garcinia kingaensis
- Garcinia lanceifolia
- Garcinia latissima
- Garcinia livingstonei
- Garcinia lowryi
- Garcinia lucida
- Garcinia macrophylla
- Garcinia madruno
- Garcinia magnifolia
- Garcinia maingayi
- Garcinia maluensis
- Garcinia mangorensis
- Garcinia mannii
- Garcinia merguensis
- Garcinia mestonii
- Garcinia minutiflora
- Garcinia miquelii
- Garcinia monantha
- Garcinia morella, synonym of Garcinia cambogioides var. cambogioides
- Garcinia multiflora
- Garcinia murtonii
- Garcinia myrtifolia
- Garcinia nervosa
- Garcinia nigrolineata
- Garcinia oblongifolia
- Garcinia oliveri
- Garcinia opaca, synonym of Garcinia diospyrifolia var. diospyrifolia
- Garcinia orthoclada
- Garcinia ovalifolia
- Garcinia pachycarpa
- Garcinia pachyclada
- Garcinia parvifolia
- Garcinia pauciflora
- Garcinia pedunculata
- Garcinia penangiana
- Garcinia prainiana
- Garcinia portoricensis
- Garcinia preussii
- Garcinia pseudoguttifera
- Garcinia punctata
- Garcinia pyrifera
- Garcinia quadrifaria
- Garcinia revoluta
- Garcinia rigida
- Garcinia riparia
- Garcinia rostrata
- Garcinia sabangensis
- Garcinia schomburgkiana
- Garcinia schraderi
- Garcinia scortechinii
- Garcinia sessilis
- Garcinia sizygiifolia
- Garcinia smeathmanii
- Garcinia spicata
- Garcinia subelliptica
- Garcinia subtilinervis
- Garcinia talbotii
- Garcinia tetrandra
- Garcinia thorelii
- Garcinia tsaratananae
- Garcinia uniflora
- Garcinia urophylla
- Garcinia venulosa
- Garcinia verrucosa
- Garcinia vidalii
- Garcinia vilersiana
- Garcinia vitiensis
- Garcinia warburgiana
- Garcinia warrenii
- Garcinia xanthochymus
- Lorostemon bombaciflorus
- Lorostemon colombianus
- Lorostemon stipitatus
- Moronobea coccinea
- Moronobea jenmanii
- Moronobea pulchra
- Moronobea riparia
- Pentadesma butyracea
- Pentadesma grandifolia
- Pentadesma reyndersii
- Symphonia globulifera
- Symphonia gymnoclada
- Symphonia louvelii
- Symphonia microphylla
- Symphonia nectarifera
- Symphonia pauciflora
- Symphonia tanalensis
- Symphonia urophylla
- Symphonia verrucosa
- Tovomita acutiflora
- Tovomita amazonica
- Tovomita brevistaminea
- Tovomita caloneura
- Tovomita carinata
- Tovomita choisyana
- Tovomita foldatsii
- Tovomita fructipendula
- Tovomita glazoviana
- Tovomita gracilipes
- Tovomita grata
- Tovomita guianensis
- Tovomita laurina
- Tovomita leucantha
- Tovomita longifolia
- Tovomita macrophylla
- Tovomita mangle
- Tovomita riedeliana
- Tovomita schomburgkii
- Tovomita secunda
- Tovomita speciosa
- Tovomita spruceana
- Tovomita stergiosii
- Tovomita stylosa
- Tovomita umbellata
- Tovomita volkeri
- Tovomitopsis paniculata

==== Elatinaceae ====
- Bergia anagalloides
- Bergia polyantha
- Elatine ambigua
- Elatine americana
- Elatine brachysperma
- Elatine ecuadoriensis
- Elatine gussonei
- Elatine macropoda
- Elatine minima
- Elatine rubella
- Elatine triandra

==== Erythroxylaceae ====
- Erythroxylum sechellarum

==== Euphorbiaceae ====
Species

- Acalypha parvula
- Argythamnia proctorii, Cayman silverbush
- Baloghia alternifolia
- Baloghia buchholzii
- Baloghia deplanchei
- Baloghia parviflora
- Caperonia zaponzeta
- Chrozophora tinctoria, Dyer's litmus
- Claoxylon collenettei
- Cnidoscolus aconitifolius
- Croton eluteria
- Croton punctatus
- Croton scouleri
- Croton socotranus
- Endospermum myrmecophilum
- Erythrococca berberidea
- Euphorbia adenopoda
- Euphorbia alluaudii
- Euphorbia amplexicaulis, chamaesyce
- Euphorbia angrae
- Euphorbia antso
- Euphorbia aprica
- Euphorbia arahaka
- Euphorbia boivinii
- Euphorbia cuneifolia
- Euphorbia denisii
- Euphorbia dichroa
- Euphorbia emirnensis
- Euphorbia enterophora
- Euphorbia fiherenensis
- Euphorbia friedrichiae
- Euphorbia intisy
- Euphorbia kaokoensis
- Euphorbia kischenensis
- Euphorbia lavrani
- Euphorbia mainty
- Euphorbia milii
- Euphorbia namibensis
- Euphorbia nevadensis
- Euphorbia nummularia
- Euphorbia orthoclada
- Euphorbia pachysantha
- Euphorbia palustris
- Euphorbia paniculata
- Euphorbia pervilleana
- Euphorbia petraea
- Euphorbia physoclada
- Euphorbia plagiantha
- Euphorbia punctulata
- Euphorbia rangovalensis
- Euphorbia recurva
- Euphorbia spiralis
- Euphorbia stenoclada
- Euphorbia tetraptera
- Euphorbia tirucalli
- Euphorbia torralbasii
- Euphorbia transtagana
- Euphorbia verruculosa
- Euphorbia viminea
- Excoecaria agallocha
- Garcia nutans
- Gymnanthes lucida
- Hevea brasiliensis
- Hippomane mancinella
- Hippomane spinosa
- Homalanthus acuminatus
- Homonoia retusa
- Homonoia riparia, willow-leaved water croton
- Jatropha curcas
- Jatropha dioica
- Jatropha multifida
- Jatropha unicostata
- Macaranga attenuata
- Macaranga denticulata
- Macaranga venosa
- Micrandra spruceana
- Pachystroma longifolium
- Spathiostemon javensis
- Tragia balfourii

Subspecies

- Euphorbia enterophora subsp. enterophora
- Euphorbia orthoclada subsp. orthoclada
- Euphorbia stenoclada subsp. stenoclada

Varieties

- Euphorbia boivinii var. boivinii
- Euphorbia boivinii var. oreades
- Euphorbia tetraptera var. tetraptera
- Jatropha hildebrandtii var. torrentis-lugardi

==== Hypericaceae ====
- Cratoxylum arborescens
- Cratoxylum cochinchinense
- Cratoxylum formosum
- Cratoxylum maingayi
- Cratoxylum sumatranum
- Hypericum anagalloides
- Hypericum boreale
- Hypericum corsicum
- Hypericum ellipticum
- Hypericum elodes
- Hypericum llanganaticum
- Hypericum majus
- Hypericum quitense
- Hypericum scopulorum
- Hypericum socotranum
- Hypericum tortuosum
- Triadenum fraseri
- Triadenum virginicum

==== Irvingiaceae ====
- Allantospermum borneense var. borneense

==== Malpighiaceae ====
- Acridocarpus alopecurus
- Acridocarpus socotranus
- Acridocarpus zanzibaricus
- Byrsonima crassifolia
- Spachea elegans

==== Ochnaceae ====
- Brackenridgea elegantissima
- Campylospermum serratum
- Euthemis leucocarpa
- Euthemis minor
- Quiina macrophylla
- Schuurmansia elegans
- Schuurmansiella angustifolia

==== Phyllanthaceae ====
Species

- Astrocasia tremula
- Baccaurea motleyana
- Baccaurea polyneura
- Baccaurea pubera
- Baccaurea ramiflora
- Breynia androgyna, synonym of Phyllanthus androgynus
- Bridelia retusa
- Glochidion album
- Glochidion amentuligerum
- Glochidion anfractuosum
- Glochidion angulatum
- Glochidion apodogynum
- Glochidion beehleri
- Glochidion benthamianum
- Glochidion borgmannii
- Glochidion borneense
- Glochidion bracteatum
- Glochidion calospermum
- Glochidion carrii
- Glochidion castaneum
- Glochidion chlamydogyne
- Glochidion chondrocarpum
- Glochidion coccineum
- Glochidion disparipes
- Glochidion ellipticum
- Glochidion elmeri
- Glochidion eucleoides
- Glochidion gillespiei
- Glochidion gimi
- Glochidion granulare
- Glochidion heyneanum
- Glochidion hohenackeri
- Glochidion hylandii
- Glochidion insectum
- Glochidion insigne
- Glochidion kerangae
- Glochidion kerrii
- Glochidion khasicum
- Glochidion lambiricum
- Glochidion macrocarpum
- Glochidion macrostigma
- Glochidion manono
- Glochidion marchionicum
- Glochidion mindorense
- Glochidion mitrastylum
- Glochidion moluccanum
- Glochidion monostylum
- Glochidion nesophilum
- Glochidion novoguineense
- Glochidion oblatum
- Glochidion pachyconum
- Glochidion philippicum
- Glochidion pomiferum
- Glochidion pubicapsa
- Glochidion ramiflorum
- Glochidion roseum
- Glochidion rubrum
- Glochidion sessiliflorum
- Glochidion singaporense
- Glochidion striatum
- Glochidion styliferum
- Glochidion superbum
- Glochidion taitense
- Glochidion thomsonii
- Glochidion triandrum
- Glochidion wallichianum
- Glochidion williamsii
- Glochidion wisselense
- Glochidion zeylanicum
- Phyllanthus acuminatus
- Phyllanthus acustylus
- Phyllanthus aeneus
- Phyllanthus albidiscus
- Phyllanthus alticola
- Phyllanthus ambiguus
- Phyllanthus anisolobus
- Phyllanthus ankarana
- Phyllanthus aphanostylus
- Phyllanthus archboldianus
- Phyllanthus atabapoensis
- Phyllanthus attenuatus
- Phyllanthus baladensis
- Phyllanthus billardierei
- Phyllanthus botryanthus
- Phyllanthus buxifolius
- Phyllanthus caledonicus
- Phyllanthus callejasii
- Phyllanthus carlottae
- Phyllanthus casticum
- Phyllanthus castus
- Phyllanthus chacoensis
- Phyllanthus chrysanthus
- Phyllanthus ciccoides
- Phyllanthus cladotrichus
- Phyllanthus clamboides
- Phyllanthus columnaris
- Phyllanthus concolor
- Phyllanthus cordatus
- Phyllanthus cuscutiflorus
- Phyllanthus daltonii
- Phyllanthus deplanchei
- Phyllanthus dracunculoides
- Phyllanthus effusus
- Phyllanthus elsiae
- Phyllanthus emblica
- Phyllanthus engleri
- Phyllanthus epiphyllanthus
- Phyllanthus eriocarpus
- Phyllanthus faguetii
- Phyllanthus ferdinandi
- Phyllanthus finschii
- Phyllanthus flaviflorus
- Phyllanthus francii
- Phyllanthus fulvirameus
- Phyllanthus fuscoluridus
- Phyllanthus gillettianus
- Phyllanthus glomerulatus
- Phyllanthus gneissicus
- Phyllanthus harrisii
- Phyllanthus heterodoxus
- Phyllanthus ivohibeus
- Phyllanthus juglandifolius
- Phyllanthus kaessneri
- Phyllanthus kanalensis
- Phyllanthus lanceilimbus
- Phyllanthus lanceolarius
- Phyllanthus lawii
- Phyllanthus ligustrifolius
- Phyllanthus littoralis
- Phyllanthus lobocarpus
- Phyllanthus lucidus
- Phyllanthus lutescens
- Phyllanthus madagascariensis
- Phyllanthus madeirensis
- Phyllanthus maderaspatensis
- Phyllanthus martii
- Phyllanthus matitanensis
- Phyllanthus meghalayensis
- Phyllanthus microcarpus
- Phyllanthus microdendron
- Phyllanthus mirabilis
- Phyllanthus mocinianus
- Phyllanthus mollis
- Phyllanthus montrouzieri
- Phyllanthus myriophyllus
- Phyllanthus myrsinites
- Phyllanthus nutans
- Phyllanthus obscurus
- Phyllanthus oreichtitus
- Phyllanthus ouveanus
- Phyllanthus ovalifolius
- Phyllanthus oxyphyllus
- Phyllanthus pachyphyllus
- Phyllanthus pacificus
- Phyllanthus pectinatus
- Phyllanthus pergracilis
- Phyllanthus pervilleanus
- Phyllanthus physocarpus
- Phyllanthus poeppigianus
- Phyllanthus polyanthus
- Phyllanthus praelongipes
- Phyllanthus pronyensis
- Phyllanthus pullenii
- Phyllanthus reticulatus
- Phyllanthus riedelianus
- Phyllanthus ruber
- Phyllanthus rubriflorus
- Phyllanthus rupestris
- Phyllanthus salviifolius
- Phyllanthus seemannii
- Phyllanthus sericeus
- Phyllanthus serpentinus
- Phyllanthus sikkimensis
- Phyllanthus sphaerogynus
- Phyllanthus submollis
- Phyllanthus subscandens
- Phyllanthus symphoricarpoides
- Phyllanthus tequilensis
- Phyllanthus thulinii
- Phyllanthus trichotepalus
- Phyllanthus valeriae
- Phyllanthus vitiensis
- Phyllanthus vulcani
- Phyllanthus xerocarpus
- Phyllanthus yaouhensis
- Spondianthus preussii

Subspecies

- Phyllanthus nutans subsp. nutans

Varieties

- Phyllanthus aeneus var. aeneus
- Phyllanthus kaessneri var. polycytotrichus

==== Rhizophoraceae ====
- Bruguiera cylindrica
- Bruguiera exaristata
- Bruguiera gymnorhiza, Oriental mangrove
- Bruguiera parviflora, smallflower bruguiera
- Bruguiera sexangula
- Carallia brachiata
- Ceriops australis
- Ceriops tagal
- Ceriops zippeliana
- Kandelia candel
- Kandelia obovata
- Pellacalyx lobbii
- Pellacalyx saccardianus
- Pellacalyx symphiodiscus
- Rhizophora apiculata
- Rhizophora mangle, red mangrove
- Rhizophora mucronata
- Rhizophora racemosa
- Rhizophora stylosa

==== Salicaceae ====
- Carrierea calycina
- Casearia atlantica
- Casearia aculeata, cockspur
- Casearia barteri
- Flacourtia indica
- Pleuranthodendron lindenii
- Populus alba
- Populus heterophylla
- Populus nigra, black poplar
- Populus tremula
- Ryania speciosa
- Salix acmophylla
- Salix alba, white willow
- Salix amplexicaulis
- Salix athabascensis
- Salix bebbiana
- Salix canariensis
- Salix candida
- Salix cinerea
- Salix commutata
- Salix daphnoides, European violet-willow
- Salix eriocephala
- Salix excelsa
- Salix famelica
- Salix farriae
- Salix lanata
- Salix lutea
- Salix melanopsis
- Salix monticola
- Salix myrtillifolia
- Salix pedicellaris
- Salix pedicellata
- Salix petiolaris
- Salix planifolia
- Salix prolixa
- Salix pyrifolia
- Salix pyrolifolia
- Salix sericea
- Salix serissima

==== Other Malpighiales species ====
- Caryocar brasiliense
- Drypetes deplanchei
- Drypetes gerrardii
- Drypetes lateriflora
- Erblichia odorata
- Picrodendron baccatum
- Podostemum ceratophyllum

=== Malvales ===
==== Dipterocarpaceae ====
Species

- Anisoptera grossivenia
- Cotylelobium melanoxylon
- Dipterocarpus condorensis
- Dipterocarpus cornutus
- Dipterocarpus globosus
- Dipterocarpus kunstleri
- Dipterocarpus nudus
- Dipterocarpus oblongifolius
- Dipterocarpus validus
- Dryobalanops beccarii
- Dryobalanops lanceolata
- Dryobalanops oblongifolia
- Hopea bracteata
- Hopea dryobalanoides
- Hopea mesuoides
- Hopea nervosa
- Hopea nodosa
- Hopea novoguineensis
- Hopea papuana
- Hopea parviflora, synonym of Hopea indica
- Hopea plagata
- Hopea pterygota
- Hopea rugifolia
- Hopea similis
- Hopea vesquei
- Marquesia acuminata
- Marquesia excelsa
- Marquesia macroura
- Monotes adenophyllus
- Monotes africanus
- Monotes autennei
- Monotes dasyanthus
- Monotes engleri
- Monotes glaber
- Monotes gossweileri
- Monotes hypoleucus
- Monotes katangensis
- Monotes kerstingii
- Monotes magnificus
- Parashorea malaanonan
- Parashorea parvifolia
- Parashorea tomentella
- Pseudomonotes tropenbosii
- Shorea acuminata, synonym of Rubroshorea acuminata
- Shorea acuta, synonym of Rubroshorea acuta
- Shorea argentifolia, synonym of Rubroshorea argentifolia
- Shorea assamica, synonym of Anthoshorea assamica
- Shorea balanocarpoides, synonym of Richetia balanocarpoides
- Shorea beccariana, synonym of Rubroshorea beccariana
- Shorea contorta, synonym of Pentacme contorta
- Shorea crassa
- Shorea curtisii, synonym of Rubroshorea curtisii
- Shorea fallax, synonym of Rubroshorea fallax
- Shorea havilandii
- Shorea hopeifolia, synonym of Richetia hopeifolia
- Shorea kunstleri, synonym of Rubroshorea kunstleri
- Shorea laxa, synonym of Richetia laxa
- Shorea macrophylla, synonym of Rubroshorea macrophylla
- Shorea macroptera, synonym of Rubroshorea macroptera
- Shorea micans
- Shorea monticola, synonym of Rubroshorea monticola
- Shorea multiflora, synonym of Richetia multiflora
- Shorea negrosensis, synonym of Rubroshorea negrosensis
- Shorea ovalis, synonym of Rubroshorea ovalis
- Shorea ovata, synonym of Rubroshorea ovata
- Shorea palosapis, synonym of Rubroshorea palosapis
- Shorea parvifolia, synonym of Rubroshorea parvifolia
- Shorea parvistipulata, synonym of Rubroshorea parvistipulata
- Shorea pinanga, synonym of Rubroshorea pinanga
- Shorea polita, synonym of Anthoshorea polita
- Shorea polysperma, synonym of Rubroshorea polysperma
- Shorea pubistyla, synonym of Rubroshorea pubistyla
- Shorea siamensis, synonym of Pentacme siamensis
- Shorea venulosa, synonym of Rubroshorea venulosa
- Vatica albiramis
- Vatica granulata
- Vatica lowii
- Vatica micrantha
- Vatica oblongifolia
- Vatica odorata
- Vatica rassak
- Vatica umbonata
- Vatica umbonata subsp. acrocarpa, synonym of Vatica acrocarpa

Subspecies

- Vatica odorata subsp. odorata

==== Malvaceae ====
Species

- Abelmoschus angulosus
- Abelmoschus crinitus
- Abelmoschus ficulneus
- Abelmoschus moschatus
- Abutilon depauperatum
- Adansonia gregorii
- Adansonia madagascariensis
- Adansonia rubrostipa
- Adansonia za
- Bombax buonopozense
- Bombax ceiba
- Boschia grandiflora
- Camptostemon schultzii
- Ceiba pentandra
- Corchorus erodiodes
- Dombeya acutangula
- Dombeya rotundifolia
- Firmiana colorata
- Firmiana simplex
- Goethalsia meiantha
- Gossypium darwinii, Darwin's cotton
- Guazuma ulmifolia
- Gyranthera darienensis
- Hampea thespesioides
- Heritiera littoralis
- Herrania laciniifolia, synonym of Theobroma laciniifolium
- Hibiscus diriffan
- Hibiscus moscheutos
- Hibiscus quattenensis
- Hibiscus stenanthus
- Hildegardia erythrosiphon
- Kosteletzkya pentacarpos
- Matisia cordata
- Matisia exalata
- Matisia sanblasensis
- Melhania phillipsiae
- Microcos globulifera
- Microcos laurifolia
- Nototriche jamesonii
- Ochroma pyramidale
- Quararibea yunckeri
- Rhodognaphalon schumannianum, East African bombax, synonym of Rhodognaphalon mossambicense
- Scaphium macropodum, malva nut
- Sterculia parviflora
- Thespesia mossambicensis
- Tilia platyphyllos, large-leaved lime
- Triplochiton scleroxylon

Varieties

- Tilia paucicostata var. yunnanensis

==== Sarcolaenaceae ====
- Leptolaena cuspidata
- Leptolaena gautieri
- Leptolaena multiflora
- Leptolaena pauciflora
- Rhodolaena coriacea
- Rhodolaena humblotii
- Sarcolaena multiflora
- Sarcolaena oblongifolia
- Schizolaena cauliflora
- Schizolaena elongata
- Schizolaena exinvolucrata
- Schizolaena gereaui
- Schizolaena hystrix

==== Sphaerosepalaceae ====
- Rhopalocarpus alternifolius
- Rhopalocarpus coriaceus
- Rhopalocarpus louvelii
- Rhopalocarpus lucidus
- Rhopalocarpus macrorhamnifolius
- Rhopalocarpus similis

==== Thymelaeaceae ====
- Atemnosiphon coriaceus
- Daphne petraea
- Daphnopsis occidentalis, burn nose
- Gnidia daphnifolia
- Gnidia socotrana
- Gonystylus borneensis
- Octolepis dioica
- Peddiea involucrata
- Phaleria capitata
- Phaleria perrottetiana
- Restella alberti
- Stephanodaphne geminata
- Wikstroemia coriacea

==== Other Malvales ====
Species

- Bixa orellana
- Cistus libanotis
- Pakaraimaea dipterocarpacea
- Sloanea assamica
- Sloanea tomentosa

Subspecies

- Pakaraimaea dipterocarpacea subsp. nitida

=== Myrtales ===
There are 149 species in the order Myrtales assessed as least concern.

==== Combretaceae ====
- Combretum glaucocarpum
- Conocarpus erectus, silver-leaved buttonwood
- Laguncularia racemosa, white mangrove
- Lumnitzera littorea
- Lumnitzera racemosa
- Terminalia amazonia
- Terminalia bellirica
- Terminalia leiocarpa
- Terminalia nitens
- Terminalia parvifolia
- Terminalia tetraphylla

==== Lythraceae ====
- Ammannia auriculata
- Ammannia baccifera, blistering ammania
- Ammannia multiflora
- Ammannia octandra
- Ammannia robusta
- Ammannia senegalensis, red ammannia
- Ammannia verticillata
- Capuronia benoistii
- Decodon verticillatus
- Lafoensia pacari
- Lythrum alatum
- Lythrum borysthenicum, loosestrife
- Lythrum hyssopifolia, grass-poly
- Lythrum junceum, false grass-poly
- Lythrum portula, spatulaleaf loosestrife
- Lythrum salicaria, purple loosestrife
- Lythrum thymifolia, thymeleaf loosestrife
- Lythrum tribracteatum, threebract loosestrife
- Nesaea brevipes
- Nesaea prostrata
- Pemphis acidula
- Punica granatum, pomegranate
- Rotala densiflora
- Rotala fimbriata
- Rotala fluitans
- Rotala illecebroides
- Rotala indica
- Rotala macrandra
- Rotala malampuzhensis
- Rotala mexicana
- Rotala occultiflora
- Rotala ramosior
- Rotala rosea
- Rotala rotundifolia
- Rotala serpyllifolia
- Rotala verticillaris
- Sonneratia alba
- Sonneratia apetala
- Sonneratia caseolaris
- Sonneratia lanceolata
- Woodfordia fruticosa

==== Melastomataceae ====
- Astronidium fraternum
- Astronidium glabrum
- Astronidium ligulatum
- Astronidium robustum
- Astronidium saccatum
- Astronidium victoriae
- Axinaea merianiae
- Blakea subvaginata
- Brachyotum alpinum
- Brachyotum confertum
- Chalybea minor
- Conostegia centronioides
- Dionychastrum schliebenii
- Dissotis dichaetantheroides
- Dissotis polyantha
- Lijndenia udzungwarum
- Medinilla engleri
- Memecylon deminutum
- Memecylon elaeagni
- Memecylon greenwayi
- Memecylon plebejum
- Memecylon trunciflorum
- Meriania drakei
- Miconia caesariata
- Miconia glandulistyla
- Miconia papillosa
- Miconia phaeochaeta
- Miconia rivetii
- Miconia tomentosa
- Mouriri gleasoniana
- Rhexia virginica
- Triolena pustulata
- Warneckea erubescens
- Warneckea microphylla

==== Myrtaceae ====
- Agonis flexuosa
- Amomyrtus luma
- Amomyrtus meli
- Angophora bakeri
- Angophora costata
- Angophora leiocarpa
- Angophora melanoxylon
- Angophora robur
- Angophora subvelutina
- Angophora woodsiana
- Archirhodomyrtus baladensis
- Archirhodomyrtus turbinata
- Astartea affinis
- Astartea leptophylla
- Asteromyrtus angustifolia
- Asteromyrtus brassii
- Asteromyrtus symphyocarpa
- Baeckea frutescens
- Blepharocalyx eggersii
- Calycolpus calophyllus
- Calycolpus cochleatus
- Calycolpus goetheanus
- Calycolpus moritzianus
- Calycolpus revolutus
- Calycolpus roraimensis
- Calycolpus warszewiczianus
- Calycorectes acutatus
- Calyptranthes fasciculata
- Calyptranthes grandifolia
- Calyptranthes widgreniana
- Campomanesia dichotoma
- Campomanesia eugenioides
- Campomanesia grandiflora
- Campomanesia guazumifolia
- Campomanesia ilhoensis
- Campomanesia laurifolia
- Campomanesia lineatifolia
- Campomanesia neriiflora
- Campomanesia phaea
- Campomanesia pubescens
- Campomanesia rufa
- Campomanesia schlechtendaliana
- Campomanesia sessiliflora
- Campomanesia speciosa
- Campomanesia velutina
- Chamguava schippii
- Cloezia artensis
- Cloezia floribunda
- Corymbia abbreviata
- Corymbia abergiana
- Corymbia aparrerinja
- Corymbia arafurica
- Corymbia arenaria
- Corymbia arnhemensis
- Corymbia aspera
- Corymbia aureola
- Corymbia bella
- Corymbia blakei
- Corymbia bleeseri
- Corymbia bloxsomei
- Corymbia brachycarpa
- Corymbia bunites
- Corymbia cadophora
- Corymbia candida
- Corymbia chartacea
- Corymbia chippendalei
- Corymbia citriodora
- Corymbia clarksoniana
- Corymbia clavigera
- Corymbia cliftoniana
- Corymbia collina
- Corymbia confertiflora
- Corymbia dallachiana
- Corymbia dendromerinx
- Corymbia deserticola
- Corymbia dichromophloia
- Corymbia disjuncta
- Corymbia dunlopiana
- Corymbia ellipsoidea
- Corymbia eremaea
- Corymbia erythrophloia
- Corymbia eximia
- Corymbia ferriticola
- Corymbia ferruginea
- Corymbia flavescens
- Corymbia foelscheana
- Corymbia gilbertensis
- Corymbia grandifolia
- Corymbia greeniana
- Corymbia haematoxylon
- Corymbia hamersleyana
- Corymbia hendersonii
- Corymbia henryi
- Corymbia hylandii
- Corymbia intermedia
- Corymbia jacobsiana
- Corymbia karelgica, synonym of Corymbia disjuncta
- Corymbia kombolgiensis
- Corymbia lamprophylla
- Corymbia latifolia
- Corymbia leichhardtii
- Corymbia lenziana
- Corymbia ligans
- Corymbia maculata
- Corymbia nesophila
- Corymbia novoguinensis
- Corymbia oocarpa
- Corymbia opaca
- Corymbia pachycarpa
- Corymbia papillosa
- Corymbia papuana
- Corymbia pauciseta
- Corymbia peltata
- Corymbia petalophylla
- Corymbia plena
- Corymbia pocillum
- Corymbia polycarpa
- Corymbia polysciada
- Corymbia porrecta
- Corymbia ptychocarpa
- Corymbia scabrida
- Corymbia serendipita
- Corymbia setosa
- Corymbia sphaerica
- Corymbia stockeri
- Corymbia terminalis
- Corymbia torelliana
- Corymbia torta
- Corymbia trachyphloia
- Corymbia umbonata
- Corymbia watsoniana
- Corymbia zygophylla
- Decaspermum alpinum
- Decaspermum blancoi
- Decaspermum bracteatum
- Decaspermum exiguum
- Decaspermum forbesii
- Decaspermum fruticosum
- Decaspermum gracilentum
- Decaspermum hainanense
- Decaspermum humile
- Decaspermum neurophyllum
- Decaspermum parviflorum
- Decaspermum prunoides
- Decaspermum urvillei
- Decaspermum vitiense, Fiji Christmas bush
- Decaspermum vitis-idaea
- Eremaea dendroidea
- Eucalyptus acaciiformis
- Eucalyptus accedens
- Eucalyptus acies
- Eucalyptus acmenoides
- Eucalyptus acroleuca
- Eucalyptus agglomerata
- Eucalyptus alaticaulis
- Eucalyptus alatissima
- Eucalyptus alba
- Eucalyptus alligatrix
- Eucalyptus ammophila
- Eucalyptus andrewsii
- Eucalyptus angophoroides
- Eucalyptus apiculata
- Eucalyptus apodophylla
- Eucalyptus apothalassica
- Eucalyptus approximans
- Eucalyptus arachnaea
- Eucalyptus arborella
- Eucalyptus archeri
- Eucalyptus arenacea
- Eucalyptus argillacea
- Eucalyptus aridimontana
- Eucalyptus aspersa
- Eucalyptus aspratilis
- Eucalyptus assimilans
- Eucalyptus astringens
- Eucalyptus atrata
- Eucalyptus badjensis
- Eucalyptus baeuerlenii
- Eucalyptus baileyana
- Eucalyptus baiophylla
- Eucalyptus bakeri
- Eucalyptus balladoniensis
- Eucalyptus barberi
- Eucalyptus baudiniana
- Eucalyptus baxteri
- Eucalyptus beaniana
- Eucalyptus beyeriana
- Eucalyptus bigalerita
- Eucalyptus blaxellii
- Eucalyptus blaxlandii
- Eucalyptus brachyandra
- Eucalyptus brassiana
- Eucalyptus brevifolia
- Eucalyptus brevistylis
- Eucalyptus brownii
- Eucalyptus bunyip
- Eucalyptus burdettiana
- Eucalyptus burgessiana
- Eucalyptus caesia
- Eucalyptus cajuputea
- Eucalyptus caleyi
- Eucalyptus caliginosa
- Eucalyptus cameronii
- Eucalyptus campanulata
- Eucalyptus canaliculata
- Eucalyptus canescens
- Eucalyptus capitanea
- Eucalyptus carnea
- Eucalyptus carnei
- Eucalyptus ceracea
- Eucalyptus ceratocorys
- Eucalyptus cernua
- Eucalyptus chapmaniana
- Eucalyptus chartaboma
- Eucalyptus chlorophylla
- Eucalyptus clelandiorum
- Eucalyptus cloeziana
- Eucalyptus coccifera
- Eucalyptus codonocarpa
- Eucalyptus concinna
- Eucalyptus confluens
- Eucalyptus consideniana
- Eucalyptus conspicua
- Eucalyptus cooperiana
- Eucalyptus coronata
- Eucalyptus corrugata
- Eucalyptus corticosa
- Eucalyptus corynodes
- Eucalyptus cosmophylla
- Eucalyptus costuligera
- Eucalyptus crebra
- Eucalyptus creta
- Eucalyptus croajingolensis
- Eucalyptus cullenii
- Eucalyptus cupularis
- Eucalyptus cyclostoma
- Eucalyptus cylindriflora
- Eucalyptus cylindrocarpa
- Eucalyptus cypellocarpa
- Eucalyptus dalrympleana
- Eucalyptus dealbata
- Eucalyptus deanei
- Eucalyptus decolor
- Eucalyptus decorticans
- Eucalyptus deflexa
- Eucalyptus delegatensis
- Eucalyptus delicata
- Eucalyptus dendromorpha
- Eucalyptus denticulata
- Eucalyptus deuaensis
- Eucalyptus diptera
- Eucalyptus distans
- Eucalyptus distuberosa
- Eucalyptus diversicolor
- Eucalyptus dives
- Eucalyptus doratoxylon
- Eucalyptus dorrigoensis
- Eucalyptus drummondii
- Eucalyptus dundasii
- Eucalyptus dura
- Eucalyptus dwyeri
- Eucalyptus ebbanoensis
- Eucalyptus educta
- Eucalyptus effusa
- Eucalyptus elata
- Eucalyptus elegans
- Eucalyptus eremicola
- Eucalyptus eremophila
- Eucalyptus erosa
- Eucalyptus erythrocorys
- Eucalyptus eugenioides
- Eucalyptus ewartiana
- Eucalyptus exigua
- Eucalyptus exilipes
- Eucalyptus exilis
- Eucalyptus expressa
- Eucalyptus exserta
- Eucalyptus extrica
- Eucalyptus falcata
- Eucalyptus fastigata
- Eucalyptus fibrosa
- Eucalyptus fitzgeraldii
- Eucalyptus flavida
- Eucalyptus flindersii
- Eucalyptus foecunda
- Eucalyptus formanii
- Eucalyptus fraseri
- Eucalyptus fraxinoides
- Eucalyptus frenchiana
- Eucalyptus fruticosa
- Eucalyptus fusiformis
- Eucalyptus gamophylla
- Eucalyptus gardneri
- Eucalyptus gigantangion
- Eucalyptus gillenii
- Eucalyptus gillii
- Eucalyptus glaucescens
- Eucalyptus globulus
- Eucalyptus glomericassis
- Eucalyptus glomerosa
- Eucalyptus gongylocarpa
- Eucalyptus goniantha
- Eucalyptus gracilis
- Eucalyptus granitica
- Eucalyptus gregoryensis
- Eucalyptus gregsoniana
- Eucalyptus griffithsii
- Eucalyptus grossa
- Eucalyptus guilfoylei
- Eucalyptus gypsophila
- Eucalyptus herbertiana
- Eucalyptus histophylla
- Eucalyptus houseana
- Eucalyptus howittiana
- Eucalyptus hypolaena
- Eucalyptus imitans
- Eucalyptus incerata
- Eucalyptus interstans
- Eucalyptus intertexta
- Eucalyptus jensenii
- Eucalyptus kingsmillii
- Eucalyptus koolpinensis
- Eucalyptus kruseana
- Eucalyptus kybeanensis
- Eucalyptus laeliae
- Eucalyptus laevis
- Eucalyptus langleyi
- Eucalyptus lansdowneana
- Eucalyptus largeana
- Eucalyptus latisinensis
- Eucalyptus lehmannii
- Eucalyptus leptophleba
- Eucalyptus leptopoda
- Eucalyptus lesouefii
- Eucalyptus leucophloia
- Eucalyptus leucophylla
- Eucalyptus ligustrina
- Eucalyptus lirata
- Eucalyptus livida
- Eucalyptus lockyeri
- Eucalyptus longirostrata
- Eucalyptus longissima
- Eucalyptus lucasii
- Eucalyptus lucens
- Eucalyptus mackintii
- Eucalyptus macrandra
- Eucalyptus macrorhyncha
- Eucalyptus malacoxylon
- Eucalyptus mannensis
- Eucalyptus mannifera
- Eucalyptus mediocris
- Eucalyptus megacarpa
- Eucalyptus megasepala
- Eucalyptus melanophitra
- Eucalyptus melanophloia
- Eucalyptus melanoxylon
- Eucalyptus michaeliana
- Eucalyptus microneura
- Eucalyptus microtheca
- Eucalyptus miniata
- Eucalyptus minniritchi
- Eucalyptus misella
- Eucalyptus moorei
- Eucalyptus morrisii
- Eucalyptus muelleriana
- Eucalyptus multicaulis
- Eucalyptus nandewarica
- Eucalyptus nebulosa
- Eucalyptus neglecta
- Eucalyptus nigrifunda
- Eucalyptus nitens
- Eucalyptus nitida
- Eucalyptus nobilis
- Eucalyptus normantonensis
- Eucalyptus nortonii
- Eucalyptus notabilis
- Eucalyptus notactites
- Eucalyptus obconica
- Eucalyptus ochrophloia
- Eucalyptus odontocarpa
- Eucalyptus oldfieldii
- Eucalyptus olida
- Eucalyptus oligantha
- Eucalyptus olsenii
- Eucalyptus ophitica
- Eucalyptus opimiflora
- Eucalyptus optima
- Eucalyptus oraria
- Eucalyptus orbifolia
- Eucalyptus ordiana
- Eucalyptus oreades
- Eucalyptus ornata
- Eucalyptus ovularis
- Eucalyptus oxymitra
- Eucalyptus pachycalyx
- Eucalyptus pachyloma
- Eucalyptus pachyphylla
- Eucalyptus paliformis
- Eucalyptus panda
- Eucalyptus pantoleuca
- Eucalyptus parvula
- Eucalyptus patellaris
- Eucalyptus pellita
- Eucalyptus pendens
- Eucalyptus perriniana
- Eucalyptus persistens
- Eucalyptus petraea
- Eucalyptus phoenicea
- Eucalyptus pilbarensis
- Eucalyptus pimpiniana
- Eucalyptus piperita
- Eucalyptus planchoniana
- Eucalyptus planipes
- Eucalyptus platycorys
- Eucalyptus platyphylla
- Eucalyptus polita
- Eucalyptus polybractea
- Eucalyptus prava
- Eucalyptus prolixa
- Eucalyptus prominens
- Eucalyptus propinqua
- Eucalyptus protensa
- Eucalyptus provecta
- Eucalyptus proxima
- Eucalyptus pruinosa
- Eucalyptus psammitica
- Eucalyptus pterocarpa
- Eucalyptus pulverulenta
- Eucalyptus punctata
- Eucalyptus pyrocarpa
- Eucalyptus quadrangulata
- Eucalyptus quadricostata
- Eucalyptus racemosa
- Eucalyptus rameliana
- Eucalyptus ravida
- Eucalyptus redunca
- Eucalyptus regnans
- Eucalyptus repullulans
- Eucalyptus resinifera
- Eucalyptus revelata
- Eucalyptus rhombica
- Eucalyptus rigidula
- Eucalyptus rodwayi
- Eucalyptus rosacea
- Eucalyptus rossii
- Eucalyptus rowleyi
- Eucalyptus roycei
- Eucalyptus rubiginosa
- Eucalyptus rudderi
- Eucalyptus rummeryi
- Eucalyptus rupestris
- Eucalyptus saligna
- Eucalyptus saxatilis
- Eucalyptus scoparia
- Eucalyptus scyphocalyx
- Eucalyptus semiglobosa
- Eucalyptus sepulcralis
- Eucalyptus serraensis
- Eucalyptus sessilis
- Eucalyptus shirleyi
- Eucalyptus sicilifolia
- Eucalyptus sideroxylon
- Eucalyptus sieberi
- Eucalyptus similis
- Eucalyptus singularis
- Eucalyptus sinuosa
- Eucalyptus smithii
- Eucalyptus sparsa
- Eucalyptus sparsifolia
- Eucalyptus sphaerocarpa
- Eucalyptus spreta
- Eucalyptus staigeriana
- Eucalyptus stenostoma
- Eucalyptus stowardii
- Eucalyptus striaticalyx
- Eucalyptus stricklandii
- Eucalyptus stricta
- Eucalyptus subcrenulata
- Eucalyptus subtilis
- Eucalyptus suffulgens
- Eucalyptus sweedmaniana
- Eucalyptus tardecidens
- Eucalyptus tectifica
- Eucalyptus tenella
- Eucalyptus tenuipes
- Eucalyptus tenuis
- Eucalyptus tephroclada
- Eucalyptus tephrodes
- Eucalyptus terebra
- Eucalyptus tereticornis
- Eucalyptus terrica
- Eucalyptus tetrapleura
- Eucalyptus tetrodonta
- Eucalyptus tholiformis
- Eucalyptus tindaliae
- Eucalyptus tintinnans
- Eucalyptus torquata
- Eucalyptus tortilis
- Eucalyptus transcontinentalis
- Eucalyptus tricarpa
- Eucalyptus triflora
- Eucalyptus trivalva
- Eucalyptus ultima
- Eucalyptus umbra
- Eucalyptus umbrawarrensis
- Eucalyptus urnigera
- Eucalyptus utilis
- Eucalyptus vernicosa
- Eucalyptus verrucata
- Eucalyptus vicina
- Eucalyptus victoriana
- Eucalyptus victrix
- Eucalyptus viridis
- Eucalyptus vittata
- Eucalyptus vokesensis
- Eucalyptus volcanica
- Eucalyptus websteriana
- Eucalyptus whitei
- Eucalyptus wilcoxii
- Eucalyptus williamsiana
- Eucalyptus willisii
- Eucalyptus woodwardii
- Eucalyptus xerothermica
- Eucalyptus yalatensis
- Eucalyptus yilgarnensis
- Eucalyptus youmanii
- Eucalyptus youngiana
- Eucalyptus yumbarrana
- Eucalyptus zopherophloia
- Eugenia acapulcensis
- Eugenia aceitillo
- Eugenia adenantha
- Eugenia aeruginea
- Eugenia agathopoda
- Eugenia alainii
- Eugenia albicans
- Eugenia anastomosans
- Eugenia angustissima
- Eugenia anisosepala, synonym of Syzygium anisosepalum
- Eugenia arawakorum
- Eugenia arenaria
- Eugenia argyrophylla
- Eugenia armeniaca
- Eugenia astringens
- Eugenia atroracemosa
- Eugenia atrosquamata
- Eugenia aurata
- Eugenia austin-smithii
- Eugenia axillaris
- Eugenia bacopari
- Eugenia bahiensis
- Eugenia batingabranca
- Eugenia beaurepairiana
- Eugenia biflora
- Eugenia bimarginata
- Eugenia brejoensis
- Eugenia bukobensis
- Eugenia cachoeirensis
- Eugenia caducibracteata
- Eugenia calimensis
- Eugenia candolleana
- Eugenia capitulifera
- Eugenia capparidifolia
- Eugenia capuli
- Eugenia catharinensis
- Eugenia cerasiflora
- Eugenia cereja
- Eugenia chepensis
- Eugenia chlorophylla
- Eugenia christii
- Eugenia chrootricha
- Eugenia chrysophyllum
- Eugenia cincta
- Eugenia citrifolia
- Eugenia coffeifolia
- Eugenia complicata
- Eugenia confusa
- Eugenia congolensis
- Eugenia copacabanensis
- Eugenia costaricensis
- Eugenia cribrata
- Eugenia cricamolensis
- Eugenia cruegeri
- Eugenia cucullata
- Eugenia cupulata
- Eugenia cupuligera
- Eugenia cyclophylla, synonym of Eugenia astringens
- Eugenia dichroma
- Eugenia dimorpha
- Eugenia diplocampta
- Eugenia discreta
- Eugenia dittocrepis
- Eugenia dodonaeifolia
- Eugenia domingensis
- Eugenia duthieana, synonym of Syzygium duthieanum
- Eugenia dysenterica
- Eugenia egensis
- Eugenia ellipsoidea
- Eugenia erythrocarpa
- Eugenia excisa
- Eugenia expansa
- Eugenia farameoides
- Eugenia fernandez-alonsoi
- Eugenia ferreiraeana
- Eugenia flamingensis
- Eugenia flavescens
- Eugenia florida
- Eugenia foetida
- Eugenia francavilleana
- Eugenia fusca
- Eugenia gabonensis
- Eugenia galalonensis
- Eugenia galbaoensis
- Eugenia gaumeri
- Eugenia glauca, synonym of Syzygium glaucum
- Eugenia gomesiana
- Eugenia goodenovii, synonym of Syzygium goodenovii
- Eugenia gongylocarpa
- Eugenia gracillima
- Eugenia gramae-andersonii, synonym of Syzygium graeme-andersoniae
- Eugenia grandiflora
- Eugenia guanabarina
- Eugenia guatemalensis
- Eugenia guillotii
- Eugenia handroana
- Eugenia handroi
- Eugenia hazompasika
- Eugenia heterochroma
- Eugenia hiemalis
- Eugenia hiraeifolia
- Eugenia hirta
- Eugenia hondurensis
- Eugenia hypargyrea
- Eugenia ibarrae
- Eugenia intibucana
- Eugenia inundata
- Eugenia involucrata
- Eugenia isabeliana
- Eugenia itapemirimensis
- Eugenia jasminifolia, synonym of Syzygium jasminifolium
- Eugenia kaieteurensis
- Eugenia karwinskyana
- Eugenia kemamanensis, synonym of Syzygium kemamanense
- Eugenia kiahi, synonym of Syzygium kiahii
- Eugenia kleinii
- Eugenia klotzschiana
- Eugenia koordersiana, synonym of Syzygium koordersianum
- Eugenia laevicaulis
- Eugenia laevis
- Eugenia lambertiana
- Eugenia langsdorffii
- Eugenia laruotteana
- Eugenia latifolia
- Eugenia leonensis
- Eugenia leptoclada
- Eugenia liebmannii
- Eugenia ligustrina
- Eugenia limbosa
- Eugenia lindahlii
- Eugenia linearis
- Eugenia longipedunculata
- Eugenia longiracemosa
- Eugenia lucens
- Eugenia luciae
- Eugenia luschnathiana
- Eugenia macrantha
- Eugenia macrocarpa
- Eugenia macrosperma
- Eugenia magna
- Eugenia magnibracteolata
- Eugenia magnifica
- Eugenia malpighioides
- Eugenia manausensis
- Eugenia mandioccensis
- Eugenia mansoi
- Eugenia maritima
- Eugenia marowynensis
- Eugenia matogrossensis
- Eugenia megaflora
- Eugenia melanogyna
- Eugenia minuscula
- Eugenia modesta
- Eugenia monosperma
- Eugenia monticola
- Eugenia moritziana
- Eugenia moschata
- Eugenia mosenii
- Eugenia multicostata
- Eugenia multirimosa
- Eugenia myrcianthes
- Eugenia nemestrina, synonym of Syzygium nemestrinum
- Eugenia neoglomerata
- Eugenia neograndifolia
- Eugenia neomyrtifolia
- Eugenia neosilvestris
- Eugenia neoverrucosa
- Eugenia nesiotica
- Eugenia nutans
- Eugenia oblongata
- Eugenia ochrophloea
- Eugenia octopleura
- Eugenia oeidocarpa
- Eugenia oerstediana
- Eugenia omissa
- Eugenia pachnantha
- Eugenia pachystachya
- Eugenia pallidopunctata
- Eugenia patens
- Eugenia patrisii
- Eugenia pauper, synonym of Syzygium pauper
- Eugenia pergamentacea, synonym of Syzygium pergamentaceum
- Eugenia piloesis
- Eugenia pisiformis
- Eugenia pistaciifolia
- Eugenia platyphylla
- Eugenia platysema
- Eugenia pleurocarpa
- Eugenia plicata
- Eugenia pluriflora
- Eugenia polita, synonym of Syzygium politum
- Eugenia polystachya
- Eugenia prasina
- Eugenia principium
- Eugenia procera
- Eugenia pruniformis
- Eugenia pseudopsidium
- Eugenia psidiiflora, synonym of Eugenia subterminalis
- Eugenia puberula
- Eugenia punicifolia
- Eugenia pusilliflora
- Eugenia pyriflora
- Eugenia pyriformis
- Eugenia quadribracteata, synonym of Syzygium quadribracteatum
- Eugenia reinwardtiana
- Eugenia repanda
- Eugenia ridleyi, synonym of Syzygium ridleyi
- Eugenia rhombea
- Eugenia riograndis
- Eugenia rogersiana
- Eugenia rosea
- Eugenia roseiflora
- Eugenia rostrifolia
- Eugenia salacioides
- Eugenia salamensis
- Eugenia scalariformis
- Eugenia schottiana
- Eugenia selloi
- Eugenia siggersii
- Eugenia sigillata
- Eugenia sonderiana
- Eugenia speciosa
- Eugenia splendens
- Eugenia sprengelii
- Eugenia stahlii
- Eugenia stenosepala
- Eugenia stictopetala
- Eugenia stigmatosa
- Eugenia stipitata
- Eugenia subavenia
- Eugenia subundulata
- Eugenia sulcata
- Eugenia supraaxillaris
- Eugenia symingtoniana, synonym of Syzygium symingtonianum
- Eugenia symphoricarpos
- Eugenia tafelbergica
- Eugenia ternatifolia
- Eugenia tetramera
- Eugenia tikalana
- Eugenia trikii
- Eugenia umbellata
- Eugenia umbrosa
- Eugenia uniflora
- Eugenia uruguayensis
- Eugenia variolosa, synonym of Syzygium variolosum
- Eugenia venezuelensis
- Eugenia vernicosa
- Eugenia verticillata
- Eugenia vetula
- Eugenia victoriana
- Eugenia wentii
- Eugenia widgrenii
- Eugenia winzerlingii
- Eugenia woodii
- Eugenia wrayi, synonym of Syzygium wrayi
- Eugenia xalapensis
- Eugenia xiriricana
- Eugenia zuccarinii
- Eugenia zuluensis
- Feijoa sellowiana
- Gossia floribunda
- Gossia vieillardii
- Heteropyxis canescens
- Heteropyxis dehniae
- Heteropyxis natalensis
- Homalospermum firmum
- Hypocalymma angustifolium
- Kanakomyrtus longipetiolata
- Kanakomyrtus prominens
- Kania eugenioides
- Kjellbergiodendron celebicum
- Kunzea clavata
- Kunzea montana
- Kunzea robusta
- Kunzea serotina
- Kunzea sulphurea
- Kunzea tenuicaulis
- Leptospermum brachyandrum
- Leptospermum brevipes
- Leptospermum glaucescens
- Leptospermum grandifolium
- Leptospermum hoipolloi
- Leptospermum javanicum
- Leptospermum laevigatum
- Leptospermum lamellatum
- Leptospermum lanigerum
- Leptospermum morrisonii
- Leptospermum parviflorum
- Leptospermum petersonii
- Leptospermum polyanthum
- Leptospermum recurvum
- Leptospermum repo
- Leptospermum scoparium
- Leptospermum tairawhitiense
- Leptospermum trinervium
- Leptospermum variabile
- Leptospermum wooroonooran
- Lindsayomyrtus racemoides
- Lophostemon confertus
- Lophostemon suaveolens
- Luma apiculata
- Luma chequen
- Melaleuca acacioides
- Melaleuca acutifolia
- Melaleuca alsophila
- Melaleuca amydra
- Melaleuca arcana
- Melaleuca armillaris
- Melaleuca atroviridis
- Melaleuca brevifolia
- Melaleuca cajuputi
- Melaleuca clarksonii
- Melaleuca croxfordiae
- Melaleuca cuticularis
- Melaleuca dawsonii
- Melaleuca decora
- Melaleuca decussata
- Melaleuca eleuterostachya
- Melaleuca ericifolia
- Melaleuca fluviatilis
- Melaleuca foliolosa
- Melaleuca gibbosa
- Melaleuca globifera
- Melaleuca hakeifolia
- Melaleuca halmaturorum
- Melaleuca hamata
- Melaleuca hamulosa
- Melaleuca huegelii
- Melaleuca hypericifolia
- Melaleuca incana
- Melaleuca lanceolata
- Melaleuca lateriflora
- Melaleuca linariifolia
- Melaleuca longistaminea
- Melaleuca nervosa
- Melaleuca nodosa
- Melaleuca parvistaminea
- Melaleuca pauperiflora
- Melaleuca phoidophylla
- Melaleuca preissiana
- Melaleuca purpurea
- Melaleuca quinquenervia
- Melaleuca rhaphiophylla
- Melaleuca rupestris
- Melaleuca saligna
- Melaleuca sheathiana
- Melaleuca sieberi
- Melaleuca spectabilis
- Melaleuca squamophloia
- Melaleuca squarrosa
- Melaleuca stereophloia
- Melaleuca strobophylla
- Melaleuca styphelioides
- Melaleuca subalaris
- Melaleuca tamariscina
- Melaleuca teretifolia
- Melaleuca thyoides
- Melaleuca uncinata
- Melaleuca viminalis
- Melaleuca viminea
- Melaleuca viridiflora
- Melaleuca xerophila
- Metrosideros angustifolia
- Metrosideros brevistylis
- Metrosideros collina
- Metrosideros laurifolia
- Metrosideros nitida
- Metrosideros operculata
- Metrosideros parkinsonii
- Metrosideros punctata
- Metrosideros ramiflora
- Metrosideros robusta
- Metrosideros stipularis
- Metrosideros tardiflora
- Metrosideros umbellata
- Mosiera bullata
- Mosiera calycolpoides
- Mosiera ehrenbergii
- Myrceugenia acutata
- Myrceugenia acutiflora
- Myrceugenia alpigena
- Myrceugenia campestris
- Myrceugenia cucullata
- Myrceugenia exsucca
- Myrceugenia mesomischa
- Myrceugenia myrcioides
- Myrceugenia obtusa
- Myrceugenia ovalifolia
- Myrceugenia ovata
- Myrceugenia oxysepala
- Myrceugenia parvifolia
- Myrceugenia rufescens
- Myrceugenia seriatoramosa
- Myrcia adenophylla
- Myrcia albidotomentosa
- Myrcia albotomentosa
- Myrcia aliena
- Myrcia amapensis
- Myrcia amazonica
- Myrcia ambivalens
- Myrcia amshoffae
- Myrcia anacardiifolia
- Myrcia anacletoi
- Myrcia anomala
- Myrcia areolata
- Myrcia attenuata
- Myrcia bartlettii
- Myrcia bella
- Myrcia bicarinata
- Myrcia bipennis
- Myrcia blanchetiana
- Myrcia bolivarensis
- Myrcia bracteata
- Myrcia brevispicata
- Myrcia buchenavioides
- Myrcia calderonii
- Myrcia calycampa
- Myrcia camapuanensis
- Myrcia canaliculata
- Myrcia caudata
- Myrcia celaenensis
- Myrcia chytraculia
- Myrcia citrifolia
- Myrcia clausseniana
- Myrcia clusiifolia
- Myrcia coelosepala
- Myrcia convexivenia
- Myrcia costeira
- Myrcia coumete
- Myrcia crassimarginata
- Myrcia crebra
- Myrcia crispa
- Myrcia cuneifolia
- Myrcia cuprea
- Myrcia cuspidata
- Myrcia decorticans
- Myrcia deflexa
- Myrcia densa
- Myrcia densiflora
- Myrcia depauperata
- Myrcia dichasialis
- Myrcia egensis
- Myrcia elliptifolia
- Myrcia eriopus
- Myrcia eugeniopsoides
- Myrcia excoriata
- Myrcia eximia
- Myrcia exploratoris
- Myrcia fenestrata
- Myrcia ferruginea
- Myrcia florifera
- Myrcia fosteri
- Myrcia gigantifolia
- Myrcia gigas
- Myrcia glomerata
- Myrcia goyazensis
- Myrcia graciliflora
- Myrcia grammica
- Myrcia grandis
- Myrcia grazielae
- Myrcia guianensis
- Myrcia guildingiana
- Myrcia hatschbachii
- Myrcia hebepetala
- Myrcia hedraiophylla
- Myrcia heringii
- Myrcia hirtiflora
- Myrcia holstii
- Myrcia hondurensis
- Myrcia hylobates
- Myrcia icnii
- Myrcia imperfecta
- Myrcia inaequiloba
- Myrcia insignis
- Myrcia karlingii
- Myrcia karuaiensis
- Myrcia krugioides
- Myrcia lapidulosa
- Myrcia laricina
- Myrcia laruotteana
- Myrcia lasiantha
- Myrcia legrandii
- Myrcia lenheirensis
- Myrcia lepida
- Myrcia lignosa
- Myrcia linearifolia
- Myrcia littoralis
- Myrcia lituatinervia
- Myrcia lonchophylla
- Myrcia madida
- Myrcia magna
- Myrcia maguirei
- Myrcia manuensis
- Myrcia maxima
- Myrcia mcvaughii
- Myrcia megapaniculata
- Myrcia microphylla
- Myrcia minutiflora
- Myrcia mollis
- Myrcia multiflora
- Myrcia mutabilis
- Myrcia myrtillifolia
- Myrcia neobracteata
- Myrcia neobrasiliensis
- Myrcia neoclusiifolia
- Myrcia neocuprea
- Myrcia neoforsteri
- Myrcia neolucida
- Myrcia neomacrocarpa
- Myrcia neomontana
- Myrcia neoobscura
- Myrcia neoregeliana
- Myrcia neoriedeliana
- Myrcia neorubella
- Myrcia neoschomburgkiana
- Myrcia neosintenisii
- Myrcia neospeciosa
- Myrcia neosuaveolens
- Myrcia neovelutina
- Myrcia nervata
- Myrcia neuwiedeana
- Myrcia nitida
- Myrcia nivea
- Myrcia nubicola
- Myrcia oblongata
- Myrcia obovata
- Myrcia obumbrans
- Myrcia oleifolia
- Myrcia paivae
- Myrcia palustris
- Myrcia pentagona
- Myrcia piauhiensis
- Myrcia pistrinalis
- Myrcia platyclada
- Myrcia pleophlebia
- Myrcia plicata
- Myrcia plusiantha
- Myrcia polyantha
- Myrcia polysticta
- Myrcia popayanensis
- Myrcia pubiflora
- Myrcia pulchella
- Myrcia pullei
- Myrcia pyrifolia
- Myrcia quitarensis
- Myrcia racemosa
- Myrcia racemulosa
- Myrcia reticulosa
- Myrcia retorta
- Myrcia revolutifolia
- Myrcia rotundata
- Myrcia rufipes
- Myrcia rufipila
- Myrcia ruiziana
- Myrcia rupta
- Myrcia salicifolia
- Myrcia saxatilis
- Myrcia scytophylla
- Myrcia selloi
- Myrcia servata
- Myrcia simulata
- Myrcia spinifolia
- Myrcia splendens
- Myrcia strigipes
- Myrcia subacuminata
- Myrcia subalpestris
- Myrcia subcordata
- Myrcia subcordifolia
- Myrcia subglabra
- Myrcia subobliqua
- Myrcia suborbicularis
- Myrcia subsericea
- Myrcia subsessilis
- Myrcia subulata
- Myrcia suffruticosa
- Myrcia summa
- Myrcia susannae
- Myrcia sylvatica
- Myrcia tafelbergica
- Myrcia tessmannii
- Myrcia tetraloba
- Myrcia tomentosa
- Myrcia tortuosa
- Myrcia tumidonodia
- Myrcia uaupensis
- Myrcia uberavensis
- Myrcia umbraticola
- Myrcia uniflora
- Myrcia variabilis
- Myrcia vellozoi
- Myrcia venulosa
- Myrcia verrucosa
- Myrcia verticillaris
- Myrcia vestita
- Myrcia vittoriana
- Myrcia zuzygium
- Myrcianthes cisplatensis
- Myrcianthes discolor
- Myrcianthes fragrans
- Myrcianthes hallii
- Myrcianthes karsteniana
- Myrcianthes leucoxyla
- Myrcianthes mato
- Myrcianthes myrsinoides
- Myrcianthes oreophila
- Myrcianthes orthostemon
- Myrcianthes osteomeloides
- Myrcianthes prodigiosa
- Myrcianthes rhopaloides
- Myrcianthes sanctae-martae
- Myrcianthes storkii
- Myrciaria cuspidata
- Myrciaria delicatula
- Myrciaria disticha
- Myrciaria dubia
- Myrciaria ferruginea
- Myrciaria floribunda
- Myrciaria glanduliflora
- Myrciaria glazioviana
- Myrciaria glomerata
- Myrciaria guaquiea
- Myrciaria ibarrae
- Myrciaria pilosa
- Myrciaria strigipes
- Myrciaria tenella
- Myrciaria vexator
- Myrciaria vismiifolia
- Myrrhinium atropurpureum
- Myrtastrum rufopunctatum
- Myrtella beccarii
- Myrtella bennigseniana
- Myrteola nummularia
- Myrtus communis
- Neofabricia mjoebergii
- Neofabricia myrtifolia
- Neofabricia sericisepala
- Neomitranthes capivariensis
- Neomitranthes gemballae
- Neomitranthes glomerata
- Neomitranthes obscura
- Neomitranthes warmingiana
- Neomyrtus pedunculata
- Octamyrtus behrmannii
- Octamyrtus insignis
- Octamyrtus pleiopetala
- Osbornia octodonta
- Pimenta dioica
- Pimenta guatemalensis
- Pimenta odiolens
- Pimenta racemosa
- Pleurocalyptus pancheri
- Plinia baracoensis
- Plinia cauliflora
- Plinia nana
- Plinia peroblata
- Plinia pseudodichasiantha
- Plinia rivularis
- Plinia salticola
- Pseudanamomis umbellulifera, synonym of Eugenia umbellulifera
- Pseudoeugenia singaporensis, synonym of Syzygium singaporense
- Psidium acutangulum
- Psidium amplexicaule
- Psidium appendiculatum
- Psidium australe
- Psidium brownianum
- Psidium decussatum
- Psidium densicomum
- Psidium friedrichsthalianum
- Psidium grandifolium
- Psidium guajava
- Psidium guineense
- Psidium guyanense
- Psidium hians
- Psidium longipetiolatum
- Psidium maribense
- Psidium myrsinites
- Psidium myrtoides
- Psidium oblongatum
- Psidium oligospermum
- Psidium orbifolium
- Psidium ovale
- Psidium parvifolium
- Psidium pedicellatum
- Psidium robustum
- Psidium rufum
- Psidium salutare
- Psidium schenckianum
- Psidium striatulum
- Purpureostemon ciliatus
- Regelia velutina
- Rhodamnia andromedoides
- Rhodamnia blairiana
- Rhodamnia cinerea
- Rhodamnia lancifolia
- Rhodamnia latifolia
- Rhodamnia moluccana
- Rhodamnia mulleri
- Rhodamnia pachyloba
- Rhodamnia sepicana
- Rhodamnia tessellata
- Rhodomyrtus elegans
- Rhodomyrtus lanata
- Rhodomyrtus macrocarpa
- Rhodomyrtus montana
- Rhodomyrtus pinnatinervis
- Rhodomyrtus tomentosa
- Rhodomyrtus trineura
- Sannantha bidwillii
- Sannantha pluriflora
- Siphoneugena crassifolia
- Siphoneugena densiflora
- Siphoneugena dussii
- Siphoneugena guilfoyleiana
- Siphoneugena reitzii
- Syncarpia glomulifera
- Syzygium acuminatissimum
- Syzygium acutangulum
- Syzygium adelphicum
- Syzygium adenophyllum
- Syzygium aggregatum
- Syzygium alatum
- Syzygium amicorum
- Syzygium amieuense
- Syzygium amplifolium
- Syzygium amplum
- Syzygium ampullarium
- Syzygium antisepticum
- Syzygium apiarii
- Syzygium aqueum
- Syzygium arboreum
- Syzygium arcuatinervium
- Syzygium attenuatum
- Syzygium austrocaledonicum
- Syzygium austrosinense
- Syzygium badium
- Syzygium baladense
- Syzygium banksii
- Syzygium baramense
- Syzygium barringtonioides
- Syzygium benguellense
- Syzygium benjaminum
- Syzygium bernieri
- Syzygium boerlagei
- Syzygium bordenii
- Syzygium borneense
- Syzygium brachyrachis
- Syzygium brackenridgei
- Syzygium branderhorstii
- Syzygium brongniartii
- Syzygium buettnerianum
- Syzygium bullatum
- Syzygium buxifolium
- Syzygium cacuminis
- Syzygium callianthum
- Syzygium calubcob
- Syzygium capillaceum
- Syzygium caudatilimbum
- Syzygium caudatum
- Syzygium chimanimaniense
- Syzygium chloranthum
- Syzygium cladopterum
- Syzygium claviflorum
- Syzygium clusiifolium
- Syzygium coccineum
- Syzygium conglomeratum
- Syzygium cordatum
- Syzygium corynocarpum
- Syzygium creaghii
- Syzygium cumini
- Syzygium cuneiforme
- Syzygium curtisii
- Syzygium curvistylum
- Syzygium dealbatum
- Syzygium decipiens
- Syzygium decussatum
- Syzygium deplanchei
- Syzygium diffusum
- Syzygium diospyrifolium
- Syzygium dolichophyllum
- Syzygium durifolium
- Syzygium dyerianum
- Syzygium effusum
- Syzygium elliptilimbum
- Syzygium elopurae
- Syzygium emirnense
- Syzygium eugenioides
- Syzygium evenulosum
- Syzygium faciflorum
- Syzygium fastigiatum
- Syzygium fijiense
- Syzygium filiforme
- Syzygium flagrimonte
- Syzygium flavescens
- Syzygium flosculiferum
- Syzygium formosum
- Syzygium forrestii
- Syzygium forte
- Syzygium foxworthianum
- Syzygium frutescens
- Syzygium furfuraceum
- Syzygium fusticuliferum
- Syzygium garciniifolium
- Syzygium gardneri
- Syzygium gerrardi
- Syzygium gillespiei
- Syzygium giorgii
- Syzygium glabratum
- Syzygium glanduligerum
- Syzygium gonatanthum
- Syzygium goniopterum
- Syzygium gracilipes
- Syzygium grande
- Syzygium grayi
- Syzygium griffithii
- Syzygium grijsii
- Syzygium guineense
- Syzygium hancei
- Syzygium handelii
- Syzygium havilandii
- Syzygium helferi
- Syzygium hemilamprum
- Syzygium hemisphericum
- Syzygium hirtum
- Syzygium homichlophilum
- Syzygium hoseanum
- Syzygium hylochare
- Syzygium hylophilum
- Syzygium incarnatum
- Syzygium inophylloides
- Syzygium jambos
- Syzygium kinabaluense
- Syzygium koghianum
- Syzygium kunstleri
- Syzygium laetum
- Syzygium laqueatum
- Syzygium lateriflorum
- Syzygium lecardii
- Syzygium legatii
- Syzygium leonhardii
- Syzygium leptopodium
- Syzygium leptostemon
- Syzygium leucanthum
- Syzygium leucoxylon
- Syzygium lineatum
- Syzygium littorale
- Syzygium longipes
- Syzygium lorentzianum
- Syzygium luehmannii
- Syzygium macgregorii
- Syzygium macranthum
- Syzygium magnoliifolium
- Syzygium malaccense
- Syzygium mananquil
- Syzygium medium
- Syzygium megalospermum
- Syzygium megistophyllum
- Syzygium micropodum
- Syzygium mimicum
- Syzygium mouanum
- Syzygium muelleri
- Syzygium multibracteolatum
- Syzygium multipetalum
- Syzygium myriadenum
- Syzygium myrtifolium
- Syzygium myrtillus
- Syzygium myrtoides
- Syzygium nandarivatense
- Syzygium napiforme
- Syzygium nemorale
- Syzygium neolaurifolium
- Syzygium nervosum
- Syzygium neurocalyx
- Syzygium ngoyense
- Syzygium niassense
- Syzygium nidie
- Syzygium nigricans
- Syzygium nutans
- Syzygium oblanceolatum
- Syzygium oblongifolium
- Syzygium oligomyrum
- Syzygium onesimum
- Syzygium oreophilum
- Syzygium pachyphyllum
- Syzygium pendens
- Syzygium penibukanense
- Syzygium phaeophyllum
- Syzygium phillyreifolium
- Syzygium plumeum
- Syzygium polypetaloideum
- Syzygium polypetalum
- Syzygium pondoense
- Syzygium prainianum
- Syzygium prasiniflorum
- Syzygium puberulum
- Syzygium punctilimbum
- Syzygium purpureum
- Syzygium pustulatum
- Syzygium pycnanthum
- Syzygium quadrangulatum
- Syzygium racemosum
- Syzygium rehderianum
- Syzygium rejangense
- Syzygium reticulatum
- Syzygium rhopalanthum
- Syzygium richardsonianum
- Syzygium richii
- Syzygium roemeri
- Syzygium rosaceum
- Syzygium rosulentum
- Syzygium rubescens
- Syzygium rugosum
- Syzygium sabangense
- Syzygium sakalavarum
- Syzygium salicifolium
- Syzygium salicinum
- Syzygium salwinense
- Syzygium samarangense
- Syzygium sayeri
- Syzygium schmidii
- Syzygium schumannianum
- Syzygium scortechinii
- Syzygium seemannianum
- Syzygium seemannii
- Syzygium sexangulatum
- Syzygium simillimum
- Syzygium skiophilum
- Syzygium splendens
- Syzygium stapfianum
- Syzygium steenisii
- Syzygium stipulare
- Syzygium subalatum
- Syzygium subcorymbosum
- Syzygium tawahense
- Syzygium tenuiflorum
- Syzygium tetragonum
- Syzygium tetrapleurum
- Syzygium tetrapterum
- Syzygium thornei
- Syzygium thouvenotii
- Syzygium tierneyanum
- Syzygium toninense
- Syzygium tripetalum
- Syzygium tripinnatum
- Syzygium trivene
- Syzygium ultramaficum
- Syzygium urceolatum
- Syzygium valdevenosum
- Syzygium variabile
- Syzygium versteegii
- Syzygium villamilii
- Syzygium wagapense
- Syzygium wolfii
- Syzygium womersleyi
- Syzygium xanthophyllum
- Syzygium xylopiaceum
- Syzygium zhenghei
- Syzygium zollingerianum
- Taxandria juniperina
- Taxandria linearifolia
- Tristania neriifolia
- Tristaniopsis anomala
- Tristaniopsis beccarii
- Tristaniopsis bilocularis
- Tristaniopsis callobuxus
- Tristaniopsis capitulata
- Tristaniopsis collina
- Tristaniopsis decorticata
- Tristaniopsis elliptica
- Tristaniopsis ferruginea
- Tristaniopsis glauca
- Tristaniopsis guillainii
- Tristaniopsis kinabaluensis
- Tristaniopsis macphersonii
- Tristaniopsis merguensis
- Tristaniopsis obovata
- Tristaniopsis whiteana
- Ugni myricoides
- Uromyrtus archboldiana
- Uromyrtus brassii
- Welchiodendron longivalve
- Whiteodendron moultonianum
- Xanthomyrtus arfakensis
- Xanthomyrtus compacta
- Xanthomyrtus flavida
- Xanthomyrtus humilis
- Xanthomyrtus leeuwenii
- Xanthomyrtus montivaga
- Xanthomyrtus papuana
- Xanthomyrtus schlechteri
- Xanthostemon brassii
- Xanthostemon crenulatus
- Xanthostemon petiolatus

==== Onagraceae ====
- Boisduvalia glabella
- Epilobium anatolicum
- Epilobium angustifolium, fireweed
- Epilobium ciliatum
- Epilobium coloratum
- Epilobium confusum
- Epilobium hirsutum
- Epilobium latifolium
- Epilobium leptophyllum
- Epilobium minutiflorum
- Epilobium palustre
- Epilobium parviflorum, hoary willowherb
- Epilobium strictum
- Fuchsia loxensis
- Fuchsia orientalis
- Fuchsia sylvatica
- Ludwigia alternifolia
- Ludwigia hyssopifolia, seed box
- Ludwigia octovalvis
- Ludwigia palustris, Hampshire-purslane
- Ludwigia perennis
- Ludwigia polycarpa
- Ludwigia stolonifera, creeping ludwigia

==== Trapaceae ====
- Trapa incisa
- Trapa natans, water chestnut

=== Nymphaeales ===
- Barclaya longifolia, orchid lily
- Brasenia schreberi, water-shield
- Ceratophyllum demersum, rigid hornwort
- Ceratophyllum muricatum
- Ceratophyllum submersum, soft hornwort
- Euryale ferox, gorgon
- Nelumbo lutea
- Nuphar lutea, yellow water-lily
- Nuphar pumila, least water-lily
- Nymphaea alba, European white waterlily
- Nymphaea leibergii
- Nymphaea micrantha, blue Egyptian lotus
- Nymphaea nouchali, blue lotus
- Nymphaea odorata
- Nymphaea pubescens, hairy water lily
- Nymphaea rubra
- Nymphaea tetragona

=== Oxalidales ===
==== Brunelliaceae ====
- Brunellia acostae
- Brunellia comocladifolia
- Brunellia elliptica
- Brunellia morii
- Brunellia subsessilis

==== Connaraceae ====
- Ellipanthus tomentosus

==== Elaeocarpaceae ====
- Elaeocarpus angustifolius
- Elaeocarpus sylvestris

=== Piperales ===
==== Aristolochiales ====
- Aristolochia paucinervis

==== Piperaceae ====
- Peperomia petiolata
- Peperomia pseudopereskiifolia
- Piper laevigatum
- Piper truman-yunckeri
- Saururus cernuus

=== Plantaginales ===
- Littorella uniflora, shoreweed
- Plantago bigelovii
- Plantago cordata
- Plantago eriopoda
- Plantago longissima
- Plantago macrocarpa
- Plantago major, broadleaf plantain
- Plantago maritima

=== Plumbaginales ===
- Aegialitis annulata
- Limonium multiflorum
- Limonium paulayanum
- Limonium sokotranum
- Plumbago wissii

=== Podostemales ===
- Castelnavia fluitans
- Castelnavia multipartita
- Castelnavia princeps
- Ceratolacis pedunculatum
- Cipoia inserta
- Cladopus hookeriana
- Cladopus nymanii
- Cladopus pierrei
- Cladopus taiensis
- Dalzellia zeylanica
- Dicraeanthus africanus
- Hydrobryopsis sessilis
- Hydrobryum bifoliatum
- Hydrobryum chiangmaiense
- Hydrobryum griffithii
- Hydrobryum japonicum
- Hydrobryum loeicum
- Hydrobryum micrantherum
- Hydrodiscus koyamae
- Indotristicha ramosissima
- Ledermanniella ledermannii
- Letestuella tisserantii
- Paracladopus chiangmaiensis
- Podostemum ceratophyllum
- Podostemum ovatum
- Podostemum scaturiginum
- Polypleurum dichotomum
- Polypleurum insulare
- Polypleurum schmidtianum
- Polypleurum stylosum
- Polypleurum wallichii
- Polypleurum wongprasertii
- Sphaerothylax abyssinica
- Sphaerothylax algiformis
- Terniopsis brevis
- Terniopsis malayana
- Terniopsis minor
- Thawatchaia trilobata
- Zeylanidium barberi
- Zeylanidium lichenoides
- Zeylanidium olivaceum
- Zeylanidium subulatum

=== Proteales ===
- Beauprea comptonii
- Beauprea filipes
- Beauprea gracilis
- Beauprea montana
- Grevillea striata
- Helicia attenuata
- Helicia excelsa
- Helicia petiolaris
- Leucadendron nobile
- Platanus orientalis, Oriental plane-tree
- Platanus wrightii
- Protea cynaroides

=== Ranunculales ===
==== Berberidaceae ====
- Berberis jamesonii
- Berberis kaschgarica, Kashgar barberry

==== Eupteleaceae ====
- Euptelea pleiosperma (Note: Listed by IUCN as Euptelea pleiospermum.)

==== Menispermaceae ====
- Abuta grandifolia
- Abuta grisebachii
- Abuta imene
- Abuta rufescens
- Abuta sandwithiana
- Abuta velutina
- Chondrodendron tomentosum
- Cissampelos truncata
- Hyperbaena laurifolia
- Hyperbaena leptobotryosa
- Hyperbaena mexicana
- Hyperbaena tonduzii
- Hyperbaena winzerlingii
- Tinospora oblongifolia

==== Ranunculaceae ====
Species

- Aconitum coreanum
- Aconitum napellus, aconite
- Adonis vernalis
- Anemone halleri, Haller's anemone – synonym of Pulsatilla halleri
- Anemone koraiensis
- Aquilegia alpina
- Aquilegia bertolonii
- Caltha leptosepala
- Caltha natans
- Caltha palustris
- Coptis trifolia
- Helleborus purpurascens
- Myosurus apetalus
- Pulsatilla grandis, greater pasque flower
- Pulsatilla vernalis, spring pasque flower
- Ranunculus ambigens
- Ranunculus aquatilis, common water-crowfoot
- Ranunculus aurasiacus
- Ranunculus baudotii, brackish water-crowfoot
- Ranunculus breviscapus
- Ranunculus cornutus
- Ranunculus cymbalaria
- Ranunculus dyris
- Ranunculus flabellaris
- Ranunculus flammula, lesser spearwort
- Ranunculus fluitans, river water-crowfoot
- Ranunculus gmelinii
- Ranunculus granatensis
- Ranunculus gusmannii
- Ranunculus hederaceus, ivy-leaved crowfoot
- Ranunculus hispidus
- Ranunculus hyperboreus
- Ranunculus lateriflorus
- Ranunculus lingua, greater spearwort
- Ranunculus lobbii
- Ranunculus macounii
- Ranunculus meyeri
- Ranunculus multifidus
- Ranunculus ophioglossifolius, adder's-tongue spearwort
- Ranunculus peltatus, pond water-crowfoot
- Ranunculus penicillatus, stream water-crowfoot
- Ranunculus reptans, creeping spearwort
- Ranunculus revelieri
- Ranunculus rionii
- Ranunculus saniculifolius
- Ranunculus sceleratus, celery-leaved buttercup
- Ranunculus sphaerospermus
- Ranunculus trichophyllus, thread-leaved water-crowfoot
- Trollius laxus

Subspecies

- Aquilegia vulgaris subsp. ballii

=== Rosales ===
There are 89 species, one subspecies, and four varieties in the order Rosales assessed as least concern.

==== Cannabaceae ====
- Celtis caucasica
- Trema cannabina

==== Cecropiaceae ====
- Cecropia obtusifolia

==== Crassulaceae ====
- Crassula aphylla
- Crassula aurusbergensis
- Crassula campestris
- Crassula gemmifera
- Crassula hedbergii
- Crassula inanis
- Crassula luederitzii
- Crassula numaisensis
- Crassula tillaea, mossy stonecrop
- Crassula tuberella
- Kalanchoe farinacea
- Sempervivum marmoreum

==== Cunoniaceae ====
Species

- Ackama australiensis
- Ackama brassii
- Ackama celebica
- Ackama fulva
- Ackama paniculosa
- Ackama papuana
- Ackama rosifolia
- Ackama rufa
- Aistopetalum multiflorum
- Aistopetalum viticoides
- Anodopetalum biglandulosum
- Caldcluvia paniculata
- Callicoma serratifolia
- Ceratopetalum apetalum
- Ceratopetalum gummiferum
- Ceratopetalum hylandii
- Ceratopetalum succirubrum
- Ceratopetalum virchowii
- Codia albicans
- Codia discolor
- Codia incrassata
- Codia microphylla
- Codia montana
- Codia nitida
- Codia spatulata
- Cunonia atrorubens
- Cunonia austrocaledonica
- Cunonia balansae
- Cunonia capensis
- Cunonia lenormandii
- Cunonia linearisepala
- Cunonia macrophylla
- Cunonia montana
- Cunonia pterophylla
- Cunonia pulchella
- Cunonia purpurea
- Cunonia varijuga
- Davidsonia pruriens
- Eucryphia lucida
- Eucryphia milliganii
- Geissois hippocastanifolia
- Geissois hirsuta
- Geissois imthurnii
- Geissois magnifica
- Geissois montana
- Geissois polyphylla
- Geissois pruinosa
- Geissois racemosa
- Geissois stipularis
- Geissois superba
- Geissois ternata
- Gillbeea adenopetala
- Gillbeea papuana
- Gillbeea whypallana
- Karrabina benthamiana
- Karrabina biagiana
- Lamanonia cuneata
- Lamanonia ternata
- Opocunonia nymanii
- Pancheria alaternoides
- Pancheria beauverdiana
- Pancheria billardierei
- Pancheria brunhesii
- Pancheria calophylla
- Pancheria confusa
- Pancheria elegans
- Pancheria engleriana
- Pancheria gatopensis
- Pancheria hirsuta
- Pancheria phillyreoides
- Pancheria ternata
- Platylophus trifoliatus
- Pseudoweinmannia apetala
- Pseudoweinmannia lachnocarpa
- Pterophylla bojeriana
- Pterophylla decora
- Pterophylla denhamii
- Pterophylla eriocarpa
- Pterophylla hildebrandtii
- Pterophylla humblotii
- Pterophylla lucens
- Pterophylla minutiflora
- Pterophylla racemosa
- Pterophylla rutenbergii
- Pterophylla stenostachya
- Pterophylla sylvicola
- Pullea glabra
- Pullea mollis
- Pullea stutzeri
- Schizomeria carrii
- Schizomeria clemensiae
- Schizomeria gorumensis
- Schizomeria ilicina
- Schizomeria novoguineensis
- Schizomeria ovata
- Schizomeria serrata
- Schizomeria whitei
- Spiraeanthemum brongniartianum
- Spiraeanthemum davidsonii
- Spiraeanthemum densiflorum
- Spiraeanthemum graeffei
- Spiraeanthemum integrifolium
- Spiraeanthemum katakata
- Spiraeanthemum macgillivrayi
- Spiraeanthemum meridionale
- Spiraeanthemum pubescens
- Spiraeanthemum reticulatum
- Spiraeanthemum serratum
- Vesselowskya rubifolia
- Vesselowskya venusta
- Weinmannia affinis, synonym of Pterophylla affinis
- Weinmannia anisophylla
- Weinmannia aphanoneura
- Weinmannia auriculata
- Weinmannia balbisiana
- Weinmannia burserifolia
- Weinmannia chryseis
- Weinmannia clemensiae
- Weinmannia cochensis
- Weinmannia cogolloi
- Weinmannia crassifolia
- Weinmannia cundinamarcensis
- Weinmannia dichotoma
- Weinmannia discolor
- Weinmannia elliptica
- Weinmannia fagaroides
- Weinmannia fraxinea, synonym of Pterophylla fraxinea
- Weinmannia guyanensis
- Weinmannia haenkeana
- Weinmannia heterophylla
- Weinmannia humilis
- Weinmannia jelskii
- Weinmannia kunthiana
- Weinmannia lansbergiana
- Weinmannia latifolia
- Weinmannia lechleriana
- Weinmannia lentiscifolia
- Weinmannia lopezana
- Weinmannia macrophylla
- Weinmannia mariquitae
- Weinmannia microphylla
- Weinmannia multijuga
- Weinmannia organensis
- Weinmannia ovata
- Weinmannia parviflora, synonym of Pterophylla parviflora
- Weinmannia pentaphylla
- Weinmannia pinnata
- Weinmannia polyphylla
- Weinmannia pubescens
- Weinmannia reticulata
- Weinmannia richii, synonym of Pterophylla richii
- Weinmannia trichosperma

Varieties

- Geissois ternata var. glabrior
- Geissois ternata var. ternata

==== Elaeagnaceae ====
- Elaeagnus commutata

==== Moraceae ====
Species

- Afromorus mesozygia
- Allaeanthus greveanus
- Allaeanthus luzonicus
- Ampalis dimepate
- Ampalis mauritiana
- Antiaris toxicaria
- Antiaropsis decipiens
- Artocarpus blancoi
- Artocarpus borneensis
- Artocarpus calophyllus
- Artocarpus dadah
- Artocarpus elasticus
- Artocarpus fretessii
- Artocarpus glaucus
- Artocarpus griffithii
- Artocarpus hirsutus
- Artocarpus integer
- Artocarpus lacucha
- Artocarpus lanceifolius
- Artocarpus petelotii
- Artocarpus rigidus
- Artocarpus rubrovenus
- Artocarpus sepicanus
- Artocarpus sericicarpus
- Artocarpus styracifolius
- Artocarpus teysmannii
- Artocarpus thailandicus
- Artocarpus tonkinensis
- Artocarpus treculianus
- Artocarpus vrieseanus
- Bagassa guianensis
- Batocarpus amazonicus
- Batocarpus costaricensis
- Batocarpus orinocensis
- Brosimum acutifolium
- Brosimum alicastrum
- Brosimum amazonicum
- Brosimum costaricanum
- Brosimum gaudichaudii
- Brosimum glaziovii
- Brosimum guianense
- Brosimum lactescens
- Brosimum longifolium
- Brosimum melanopotamicum
- Brosimum multinervium
- Brosimum oligandrum
- Brosimum parinarioides
- Brosimum potabile
- Brosimum rubescens
- Brosimum sprucei
- Brosimum steyermarkii
- Brosimum utile
- Broussonetia monoica
- Broussonetia papyrifera
- Castilla elastica
- Castilla tunu
- Castilla ulei
- Clarisia biflora
- Clarisia ilicifolia
- Clarisia racemosa
- Dorstenia hildebrandtii
- Dorstenia marijanmatokii
- Dorstenia nyungwensis
- Dorstenia tayloriana
- Dorstenia variifolia
- Dorstenia zanzibarica
- Ficus abelii
- Ficus abutilifolia
- Ficus aculeata
- Ficus adelpha
- Ficus adenosperma
- Ficus albert-smithii
- Ficus albipila
- Ficus albomaculata
- Ficus alongensis
- Ficus altissima
- Ficus amadiensis
- Ficus amazonica
- Ficus americana
- Ficus ampelos
- Ficus amplissima
- Ficus annulata
- Ficus antandronarum
- Ficus apiocarpa
- Ficus apollinaris
- Ficus archboldiana
- Ficus ardisioides
- Ficus arfakensis
- Ficus armitii
- Ficus arnottiana
- Ficus artocarpoides
- Ficus asperifolia
- Ficus assimilis
- Ficus atricha
- Ficus aurata
- Ficus aurea
- Ficus auriculata
- Ficus aurita
- Ficus austrina
- Ficus austrocaledonica
- Ficus badiopurpurea
- Ficus bahiensis
- Ficus balete
- Ficus balica
- Ficus banahaensis
- Ficus barclayana
- Ficus barteri
- Ficus bataanensis
- Ficus beccarii
- Ficus benghalensis
- Ficus benguetensis
- Ficus benjamina
- Ficus bernaysii
- Ficus binnendijkii
- Ficus borneensis
- Ficus botryocarpa
- Ficus botryoides
- Ficus brachyclada
- Ficus brachypoda
- Ficus bracteata
- Ficus brevibracteata
- Ficus brittonii
- Ficus broadwayi
- Ficus brunneoaurata
- Ficus bukitrayaensis
- Ficus burtt-davyi
- Ficus caballina
- Ficus cahuitensis
- Ficus caldasiana
- Ficus calimana
- Ficus callophylla
- Ficus callosa
- Ficus calopilina
- Ficus calyptrata
- Ficus capillipes
- Ficus capreifolia
- Ficus carchiana
- Ficus carica, common fig
- Ficus carpenteriana
- Ficus casapiensis
- Ficus casearioides
- Ficus castellviana
- Ficus catappifolia
- Ficus caulocarpa
- Ficus cerasicarpa
- Ficus cereicarpa
- Ficus cervantesiana
- Ficus cestrifolia
- Ficus chapaensis
- Ficus chaponensis
- Ficus chartacea
- Ficus chocoensis, synonym of Ficus guianensis
- Ficus christianii
- Ficus chrysolepis
- Ficus citrifolia
- Ficus coerulescens
- Ficus colubrinae
- Ficus comitis
- Ficus complexa
- Ficus concinna
- Ficus congesta
- Ficus conocephalifolia
- Ficus conraui
- Ficus consociata
- Ficus copiosa
- Ficus cordata
- Ficus coronata
- Ficus coronulata
- Ficus costaricana
- Ficus cotinifolia
- Ficus crassinervia
- Ficus crassipes
- Ficus crassiramea
- Ficus crassiuscula
- Ficus craterostoma
- Ficus crocata
- Ficus cuatrecasasiana
- Ficus cucurbitina
- Ficus cumingii
- Ficus cundinamarcensis
- Ficus curtipes
- Ficus cuspidata
- Ficus cyathistipula
- Ficus cyrtophylla
- Ficus dammaropsis
- Ficus davidsoniae
- Ficus delosyce
- Ficus deltoidea
- Ficus dendrocida
- Ficus densechini
- Ficus depressa
- Ficus destruens
- Ficus dewolfii
- Ficus dicranostyla
- Ficus donnell-smithii
- Ficus drupacea
- Ficus dryepondtiana
- Ficus dulciaria
- Ficus edelfeltii
- Ficus elastica
- Ficus elasticoides
- Ficus elmeri
- Ficus endochaete
- Ficus enormis
- Ficus erecta
- Ficus ernanii
- Ficus erythrosperma
- Ficus exasperata
- Ficus eximia
- Ficus filicauda
- Ficus fiskei
- Ficus fistulosa
- Ficus forstenii
- Ficus francoae
- Ficus fraseri
- Ficus fresnoensis
- Ficus fulva
- Ficus fulvopilosa
- Ficus funiculosa
- Ficus gasparriniana
- Ficus geniculata
- Ficus geocharis
- Ficus gigantosyce
- Ficus glaberrima
- Ficus glandifera
- Ficus glandulifera
- Ficus glumosa
- Ficus gomelleira
- Ficus gracillima
- Ficus greenwoodii
- Ficus greiffiana, synonym of Ficus americana subsp. greiffiana
- Ficus grevei
- Ficus grewiifolia
- Ficus grossularioides
- Ficus gul
- Ficus guntheri
- Ficus habrophylla
- Ficus hadroneura
- Ficus hahliana
- Ficus hartwegii
- Ficus hebetifolia
- Ficus hemsleyana
- Ficus henneana
- Ficus henryi
- Ficus hesperidiiformis
- Ficus heteromorpha
- Ficus heteropleura
- Ficus heteropoda
- Ficus hirsuta
- Ficus hispida
- Ficus hombroniana
- Ficus ihuensis
- Ficus ilicina
- Ficus inaequipetiolata
- Ficus ingens
- Ficus insipida
- Ficus iodotricha
- Ficus ischnopoda
- Ficus itoana
- Ficus ixoroides
- Ficus johannis
- Ficus kamerunensis
- Ficus kerkhovenii
- Ficus kochummeniana
- Ficus krukovii
- Ficus kuchinensis
- Ficus kurzii
- Ficus lagoensis
- Ficus lamponga
- Ficus langkokensis
- Ficus lapathifolia
- Ficus lauretana
- Ficus lawesii
- Ficus lawrancei
- Ficus lehmannii
- Ficus lepicarpa
- Ficus leptoclada
- Ficus leptodictya
- Ficus linearifolia
- Ficus lingua
- Ficus litseifolia
- Ficus louisii
- Ficus luschnathiana
- Ficus lutea
- Ficus lyrata
- Ficus macbridei
- Ficus machetana
- Ficus macilenta
- Ficus maclellandii
- Ficus macrophylla
- Ficus macropodocarpa
- Ficus macrorrhyncha
- Ficus madagascariensis
- Ficus magdalenica
- Ficus magnoliifolia
- Ficus malacocarpa, synonym of Ficus popenoei subsp. malacocarpa
- Ficus malayana
- Ficus marmorata
- Ficus maroniensis
- Ficus masonii
- Ficus matanoensis
- Ficus mathewsii
- Ficus matiziana
- Ficus maxima
- Ficus megaleia
- Ficus megalophylla
- Ficus melinocarpa
- Ficus membranacea
- Ficus menabeensis
- Ficus microcarpa
- Ficus microdictya
- Ficus microsyce
- Ficus midotis
- Ficus minahassae
- Ficus mollicula
- Ficus mollior
- Ficus mollis
- Ficus monckii, synonym of Ficus luschnathiana
- Ficus montana
- Ficus morobensis
- Ficus mucuso
- Ficus mutisii
- Ficus natalensis
- Ficus nervosa
- Ficus nigropunctata
- Ficus nota
- Ficus nymphaeifolia
- Ficus obliqua
- Ficus obpyramidata
- Ficus obscura
- Ficus obtusifolia
- Ficus obtusiuscula
- Ficus ocoana
- Ficus odorata
- Ficus oleifolia
- Ficus opposita
- Ficus orthoneura
- Ficus ottoniifolia
- Ficus pachyclada
- Ficus pachyrrhachis
- Ficus padana
- Ficus pallescens
- Ficus pallida
- Ficus palmata
- Ficus paludica
- Ficus panurensis
- Ficus paracamptophylla
- Ficus paraensis
- Ficus parietalis
- Ficus pedunculosa
- Ficus pellucidopunctata
- Ficus pertusa
- Ficus petiolaris
- Ficus phaeosyce
- Ficus pilulifera
- Ficus piresiana
- Ficus pisocarpa
- Ficus platyphylla
- Ficus platypoda
- Ficus pleurocarpa
- Ficus podocarpifolia
- Ficus polita
- Ficus politoria
- Ficus polyantha
- Ficus polyphlebia
- Ficus popayanensis
- Ficus popenoei
- Ficus populifolia
- icus porphyrochaete
- Ficus praetermissa
- Ficus prasinicarpa
- Ficus primaria
- Ficus pringlei
- Ficus pritchardii
- Ficus prolixa
- Ficus prostrata
- Ficus pseudojaca
- Ficus pseudopalma
- Ficus pubigera
- Ficus pubilimba
- Ficus pungens
- Ficus pustulata
- Ficus pygmaea
- Ficus pyriformis
- Ficus quercetorum
- Ficus racemosa
- Ficus reflexa
- Ficus religiosa
- Ficus retusa
- Ficus rhizophoriphylla
- Ficus ribes
- Ficus rieberiana
- Ficus riedelii
- Ficus robusta
- Ficus rosulata
- Ficus rubiginosa
- Ficus rubra
- Ficus rubrocuspidata
- Ficus rubromidotis
- Ficus ruficaulis
- Ficus rumphii
- Ficus rzedowskiana
- Ficus saccata
- Ficus sagittata
- Ficus sagittifolia
- Ficus sakalavarum
- Ficus saussureana
- Ficus saxophila
- Ficus scaberrima
- Ficus scabra
- Ficus schefferiana
- Ficus schippii
- Ficus schumacheri
- Ficus schwarzii
- Ficus scobina
- Ficus scott-elliottii
- Ficus semicordata
- Ficus semivestita
- Ficus septica
- Ficus setiflora
- Ficus simplicissima
- Ficus sinuata
- Ficus smithii
- Ficus soatensis
- Ficus sphenophylla
- Ficus squamosa
- Ficus stellaris
- Ficus stolonifera
- Ficus storckii
- Ficus stricta
- Ficus stuhlmannii
- Ficus subcongesta
- Ficus subcordata
- Ficus subcuneata
- Ficus subgelderi
- Ficus subincisa
- Ficus subnervosa
- Ficus subpisocarpa
- Ficus subpuberula
- Ficus subtrinervia
- Ficus subulata
- Ficus sumatrana
- Ficus sundaica
- Ficus superba
- Ficus sur
- Ficus sycomorus
- Ficus talbotii
- Ficus tarennifolia
- Ficus temburongensis
- Ficus tepuiensis
- Ficus tesselata
- Ficus tettensis
- Ficus theophrastoides
- Ficus thonningii
- Ficus tikoua
- Ficus tiliifolia
- Ficus tinctoria
- Ficus tonduzii
- Ficus tonsa
- Ficus trachypison
- Ficus trapezicola
- Ficus tremula
- Ficus treubii
- Ficus trianae
- Ficus trichocarpa
- Ficus trichocerasa
- Ficus trichopoda
- Ficus tricolor
- Ficus trigona
- Ficus trigonata
- Ficus triloba
- Ficus triradiata
- Ficus tsiangii
- Ficus tsjakela
- Ficus turrialbana
- Ficus ulmifolia
- Ficus umbellata
- Ficus uncinata
- Ficus uniglandulosa
- Ficus variegata
- Ficus variifolia
- Ficus variolosa
- Ficus vasculosa
- Ficus vasta
- Ficus velutina
- Ficus vermifuga
- Ficus verruculosa
- Ficus virens
- Ficus virgata
- Ficus vitiensis
- Ficus vittata
- Ficus vogeliana
- Ficus wassa
- Ficus watkinsiana
- Ficus xylophylla
- Ficus yoponensis
- Ficus ypsilophlebia
- Helicostylis elegans
- Helicostylis heterotricha
- Helicostylis pedunculata
- Helicostylis scabra
- Helicostylis tomentosa
- Helicostylis tovarensis
- Hullettia dumosa
- Maclura africana
- Maclura braziliensis
- Maclura pomifera
- Maclura tinctoria
- Maclura tricuspidata
- Maillardia montana
- Maquira calophylla
- Maquira coriacea
- Maquira guianensis
- Maquira sclerophylla
- Morus alba
- Morus cathayana
- Morus celtidifolia
- Morus macroura
- Morus microphylla
- Morus mongolica
- Morus notabilis
- Morus rubra
- Morus serrata
- Morus wittiorum
- Naucleopsis caloneura
- Naucleopsis capirensis
- Naucleopsis concinna
- Naucleopsis glabra
- Naucleopsis herrerensis
- Naucleopsis humilis
- Naucleopsis krukovii
- Naucleopsis macrophylla
- Naucleopsis naga
- Naucleopsis oblongifolia
- Naucleopsis pseudonaga
- Naucleopsis riparia
- Naucleopsis stipularis
- Naucleopsis straminea
- Naucleopsis ternstroemiiflora
- Naucleopsis ulei
- Olmedia aspera
- Parartocarpus bracteatus
- Parartocarpus venenosa, synonym of Parartocarpus venenosus
- Paratrophis anthropophagorum
- Paratrophis glabra
- Paratrophis insignis
- Paratrophis microphylla
- Paratrophis pendulina
- Paratrophis philippinensis
- Paratrophis smithii
- Perebea angustifolia
- Perebea guianensis
- Perebea humilis
- Perebea mennegae
- Perebea mollis
- Perebea rubra
- Perebea xanthochyma
- Poulsenia armata
- Prainea limpato
- Prainea scandens
- Pseudolmedia glabrata
- Pseudolmedia laevigata
- Pseudolmedia laevis
- Pseudolmedia macrophylla
- Pseudolmedia rigida
- Pseudolmedia spuria
- Pseudostreblus indicus
- Sloetia elongata
- Sloetiopsis usambarensis
- Sorocea affinis
- Sorocea briquetii
- Sorocea duckei
- Sorocea guilleminiana
- Sorocea hilarii
- Sorocea jaramilloi
- Sorocea muriculata
- Sorocea pubivena
- Sorocea racemosa
- Sorocea ruminata
- Sorocea sprucei
- Sorocea steinbachii
- Sorocea trophoides
- Sparattosyce balansae
- Sparattosyce dioica
- Streblus asper
- Taxotrophis ilicifolia
- Taxotrophis macrophylla
- Taxotrophis taxoides
- Taxotrophis zeylanica
- Treculia africana
- Treculia obovoidea
- Trilepisium madagascariense
- Trophis cuspidata
- Trophis involucrata
- Trophis mexicana
- Trophis racemosa

Subspecies

- Brosimum alicastrum subsp. bolivarense
- Ficus cyathistipula subsp. pringsheimiana
- Ficus lingua subsp. depauperata
- Ficus tremula subsp. tremula

Varieties

- Dorstenia tayloriana var. laikipiensis

==== Pittosporaceae ====
- Pittosporum pickeringii
- Pittosporum ramiflorum
- Pittosporum rapense
- Pittosporum rarotongense, Cook Islands pittosporum
- Pittosporum rhytidocarpum
- Pittosporum taitense

==== Rhamnaceae ====
Species

- Alphitonia excelsa
- Alphitonia ferruginea
- Alphitonia franguloides
- Alphitonia incana
- Alphitonia macrocarpa
- Alphitonia neocaledonica
- Alphitonia oblata
- Alphitonia petriei
- Alphitonia philippinensis
- Alphitonia pomaderroides
- Alphitonia whitei
- Alphitonia zizyphoides
- Ampelozizyphus amazonicus
- Ampelozizyphus kuripacorum
- Bathiorhamnus louvelii
- Bathiorhamnus reticulatus
- Berchemia discolor
- Berchemia floribunda
- Berchemia zeyheri
- Ceanothus caeruleus
- Ceanothus crassifolius
- Ceanothus oliganthus
- Ceanothus spinosus
- Ceanothus thyrsiflorus
- Ceanothus velutinus
- Colletia spinosissima
- Colubrina arborescens
- Colubrina articulata
- Colubrina asiatica
- Colubrina beccariana
- Colubrina berteroana
- Colubrina celtidifolia
- Colubrina cordifolia
- Colubrina decipiens
- Colubrina ehrenbergii
- Colubrina elliptica
- Colubrina faraloatra
- Colubrina glandulosa
- Colubrina greggii
- Colubrina heteroneura
- Colubrina retusa
- Colubrina spinosa
- Colubrina triflora
- Colubrina viridis
- Colubrina yucatanensis
- Condalia fasciculata
- Condalia globosa
- Condalia henriquezii
- Condalia hookeri
- Condalia mexicana
- Condalia spathulata
- Condalia velutina
- Discaria chacaye
- Emmenosperma alphitonioides
- Emmenosperma cunninghamii
- Emmenosperma micropetalum
- Emmenosperma papuanum
- Endotropis serrata
- Frangula acuminata
- Frangula alnus
- Frangula azorica
- Frangula betulifolia
- Frangula californica
- Frangula capreifolia
- Frangula caroliniana
- Frangula crenata
- Frangula discolor
- Frangula goudotiana
- Frangula granulosa
- Frangula hintonii
- Frangula longipedicellata
- Frangula longistyla
- Frangula marahuacensis
- Frangula mucronata
- Frangula oreodendron
- Frangula pendula
- Frangula pringlei
- Frangula pubescens
- Frangula purshiana
- Frangula rupestris
- Frangula scopulorum
- Gouania lineata
- Hovenia acerba
- Hovenia dulcis
- Hovenia trichocarpa
- Jaffrea xerocarpa
- Karwinskia calderonii
- Karwinskia humboldtiana
- Karwinskia johnstonii
- Karwinskia latifolia
- Karwinskia mollis
- Karwinskia rzedowskii
- Krugiodendron ferreum
- Lasiodiscus fasciculiflorus
- Lasiodiscus marmoratus
- Lasiodiscus mildbraedii
- Lasiodiscus palustris
- Lasiodiscus pervillei
- Lasiodiscus usambarensis
- Maesopsis eminii
- Noltea africana
- Ochetophila trinervis
- Oreorhamnus serrulata
- Paliurus hirsutus
- Paliurus orientalis
- Phylica paniculata
- Pseudoziziphus parryi
- Reynosia domingensis
- Reynosia septentrionalis
- Reynosia uncinata
- Rhamnella forrestii
- Rhamnella martini
- Rhamnella rubrinervis
- Rhamnella vitiensis
- Rhamnidium elaeocarpum
- Rhamnidium molle
- Rhamnus alaternus
- Rhamnus alpina
- Rhamnus cathartica
- Rhamnus crenulata
- Rhamnus crocea
- Rhamnus davurica
- Rhamnus glandulosa
- Rhamnus ilicifolia
- Rhamnus intermedia
- Rhamnus lamprophylla
- Rhamnus lanceolata
- Rhamnus leptophylla
- Rhamnus napalensis
- Rhamnus nigricans
- Rhamnus prinoides, gesho
- Rhamnus rosthornii
- Rhamnus sargentiana
- Rhamnus sibthorpiana
- Rhamnus staddo
- Rhamnus subapetala
- Rhamnus tangutica
- Rhamnus triquetra
- Rhamnus utilis
- Rhamnus virgata
- Sageretia laxiflora
- Sageretia paucicostata
- Sageretia rugosa
- Sarcomphalus amole
- Sarcomphalus cinnamomum
- Sarcomphalus domingensis
- Sarcomphalus guatemalensis
- Sarcomphalus mexicanus
- Sarcomphalus obtusifolius
- Sarcomphalus platyphyllus
- Sarcomphalus reticulatus
- Sarcomphalus saeri
- Sarcomphalus strychnifolius
- Sarcomphalus taylorii
- Sarcomphalus undulatus
- Scutia buxifolia
- Scutia myrtina
- Scutia spicata, thorn shrub
- Ventilago buxoides
- Ventilago neocaledonica
- Ventilago viminalis
- Ziziphus abyssinica
- Ziziphus angustifolia
- Ziziphus cambodiana
- Ziziphus cotinifolia
- Ziziphus horrida
- Ziziphus horsfieldii
- Ziziphus incurva
- Ziziphus inermis
- Ziziphus jujuba, jujube
- Ziziphus mauritiana
- Ziziphus montana
- Ziziphus mucronata
- Ziziphus nummularia
- Ziziphus oenopolia
- Ziziphus oxyphylla
- Ziziphus quadrilocularis
- Ziziphus rivularis
- Ziziphus rugosa
- Ziziphus spina-christi
- Ziziphus talanae
- Ziziphus timoriensis
- Ziziphus xylopyrus

Hybrids and varieties

- Rhamnus × intermedia
- Scutia spicata var. pauciflora

==== Rosaceae ====
Species

- Aflatunia ulmifolia
- Alchemilla stricta
- Alchemilla xanthochlora, lady's mantle
- Amelanchier canadensis
- Amygdalus petunnikowi, Petunnikov almond
- Comarum palustre
- Cotoneaster morulus
- Cotoneaster transcaucasicus
- Crataegus azarolus, Mediterranean hawthorn
- Crataegus korolkowi
- Crataegus laevigata, midland hawthorn
- Crataegus pinnatifida
- Crataegus pontica
- Eriobotrya cavaleriei
- Filipendula ulmaria, meadowsweet
- Geum bulgaricum
- Geum rivale
- Hagenia abyssinica
- Potentilla anserina
- Potentilla diversifolia
- Potentilla drummondii
- Potentilla norvegica
- Potentilla palustris
- Potentilla rivalis
- Potentilla supina
- Prunus americana, American plum
- Prunus arborea
- Prunus besseyi, synonym of Prunus pumila
- Prunus cerasoides
- Prunus cocomilia, Italian plum
- Prunus emarginata, bitter cherry
- Prunus fruticosa, European dwarf cherry
- Prunus gracilis, Oklahoma plum
- Prunus grisea
- Prunus henryi
- Prunus hortulana, hortulan plum
- Prunus ilicifolia
- Prunus javanica
- Prunus laurocerasus
- Prunus mahaleb
- Prunus malayana
- Prunus marsupialis
- Prunus maximowiczii
- Prunus mexicana
- Prunus mume
- Prunus occidentalis
- Prunus polystachya, bat laurel
- Prunus salicina
- Prunus subcordata
- Prunus takesimensis
- Rosa acicularis
- Rosa komarovii, Komarov's brier
- Rosa palustris
- Rosa pendulina
- Rubus arcticus
- Rubus chamaemorus
- Rubus pedatus
- Rubus pubescens
- Sanguisorba officinalis, great burnet
- Sorbus persica
- Sorbus tianschanica
- Sorbus torminalis, synonym of Aria torminalis
- Sorbus wallichii

Subspecies

- Sorbus aria subsp. lanifera

==== Urticaceae ====
Species

- Boehmeria cylindrica
- Cecropia angustifolia
- Cecropia concolor
- Cecropia longipes
- Dendrocnide urentissima
- Pilea baurii, Galápagos dead nettle
- Pilea fontana
- Urtica dioica, common nettle

Varieties

- Pipturus polynesicus var. polynesicus

==== Other Rosales species and varieties ====
- Elaeagnus angustifolia
- Grevea eggelingii

=== Santalales ===
- Agelanthus kayseri
- Arceuthobium oxycedri
- Dipentodon sinicus
- Englerina heckmanniana
- Englerina holstii
- Englerina kwaiensis
- Erianthemum rotundifolium
- Geocaulon lividum
- Globimetula pachyclada
- Heisteria maguirei
- Oncella ambigua
- Phoradendron henslovii, Galápagos mistletoe
- Scleropyrum wallichianum
- Ximenia americana

=== Sapindales ===
There are 96 species, three subspecies, and four varieties in the order Sapindales assessed as least concern.

==== Anacardiaceae ====
Species

- Abrahamia grandidieri
- Abrahamia sericea
- Anacardium occidentale, cashew
- Astronium fraxinifolium
- Astronium graveolens
- Bouea macrophylla
- Buchanania arborescens
- Buchanania insignis
- Buchanania macrocarpa
- Buchanania obovata
- Campnosperma auriculatum
- Campnosperma brevipetiolatum
- Campnosperma coriaceum
- Campnosperma micranteium
- Campnosperma schatzii
- Campnosperma squamatum
- Drimycarpus luridus
- Gluta aptera
- Gluta macrocarpa
- Gluta oba
- Gluta speciosa
- Gluta wallichii
- Heeria argentea
- Laurophyllus capensis
- Loxostylis alata
- Mangifera caesia
- Mangifera foetida, horse mango
- Mangifera gracilipes
- Mangifera magnifica
- Mangifera parvifolia
- Mangifera sylvatica
- Melanochyla beccariana
- Melanochyla castaneifolia
- Melanochyla elmeri
- Melanochyla fulvinervis
- Melanochyla nitida
- Micronychia kotozafii
- Micronychia macrophylla
- Micronychia minutiflora
- Micronychia tsiramiramy
- Operculicarya decaryi, jabily
- Parishia insignis
- Parishia sericea
- Pistacia eurycarpa
- Pistacia khinjuk
- Pistacia lentiscus, mastic tree
- Pistacia malayana
- Pistacia terebinthus, Cyprus turpentine
- Rhus potaninii, Chinese varnish tree
- Rhus taitensis
- Rhus thyrsiflora
- Schinopsis balansae
- Schinopsis quebracho-colorado
- Schinus molle
- Sclerocarya birrea
- Semecarpus australiensis
- Semecarpus borneensis
- Semecarpus bunburyanus
- Semecarpus rufovelutinus
- Spondias mombin
- Swintonia robinsonii
- Swintonia spicifera
- Toxicodendron sylvestre
- Toxicodendron vernix

Subspecies

- Rhus glutinosa subsp. glutinosa

Varieties

- Mangifera quadrifida var. quadrifida
- Ozoroa reticulata var. mossambicensis

==== Burseraceae ====
Species

- Bursera simaruba
- Canarium apertum
- Canarium asperum
- Canarium caudatum
- Canarium littorale
- Canarium merrillii
- Canarium patentinervium
- Canarium pseudopatentinervium
- Canarium vitiense
- Commiphora aprevalii
- Dacryodes costata
- Dacryodes laxa
- Dacryodes longifolia
- Dacryodes rostrata
- Protium asperum
- Santiria apiculata
- Santiria griffithii
- Santiria laevigata
- Santiria tomentosa
- Scutinanthe brunnea

Subspecies

- Canarium pilosum subsp. pilosum

==== Francoaceae ====
- Bersama swynnertonii

==== Irvingiaceae ====
- Irvingia malayana

==== Meliaceae ====
- Aglaia argentea
- Aglaia cumingiana
- Aglaia elaeagnoidea
- Aglaia elliptica
- Aglaia lawii
- Aglaia leucophylla
- Aglaia malaccensis
- Aglaia odoratissima
- Aglaia saltatorum
- Aglaia sapindina
- Aglaia spectabilis
- Aglaia tomentosa
- Aphanamixis polystachya
- Azadirachta excelsa
- Azadirachta indica
- Carapa guianensis
- Chisocheton ceramicus
- Chisocheton tomentosus
- Chukrasia tabularis
- Didymocheton fraserianus
- Dysoxylum alliaceum
- Dysoxylum gaudichaudianum, synonym of Didymocheton gaudichaudianus
- Entandrophragma caudatum
- Entandrophragma excelsum
- Melia azedarach
- Sandoricum koetjape
- Toona ciliata
- Trichilia lovettii
- Trichilia stellato-tomentosa
- Turraea mombassana
- Vavaea amicorum
- Xylocarpus granatum
- Xylocarpus moluccensis

==== Rutaceae ====
Species

- Amyris elemifera
- Citrus maxima, pomelo
- Citrus medica, citron
- Glycosmis chlorosperma
- Glycosmis cyanocarpa
- Glycosmis lanceolata
- Glycosmis pentaphylla
- Harrisonia abyssinica
- Melicope clemensiae
- Melicope hookeri
- Melicope incana
- Melicope lunu-ankenda
- Melicope revoluta
- Picrella trifoliata
- Pleiospermium latialatum
- Pleiospermium longisepalum
- Zanthoxylum acanthopodium
- Zanthoxylum delagoense
- Zanthoxylum punctatum

Varieties

- Picrella trifoliata var. trifoliata

==== Sapindaceae ====
Species

- Acer monspessulanum
- Allophylus rhomboidalis
- Arytera littoralis
- Arytera macrobotrys
- Blighia sapida
- Cubilia cubili
- Erythrophysa transvaalensis
- Exothea paniculata
- Koelreuteria paniculata
- Lepisanthes rubiginosa
- Melicoccus bijugatus
- Nephelium cuspidatum
- Nephelium hypoleucum
- Nephelium lappaceum, rambutan
- Podonephelium gongrocarpum
- Podonephelium homei
- Podonephelium pachycaule

Varieties

- Alectryon excelsus var. grandis, Three Kings titoki

==== Simaroubaceae ====
Species

- Ailanthus integrifolia, white siris
- Castela galapageia, bitterbush
- Kirkia burgeri
- Kirkia dewinteri
- Simaba borneensis
- Soulamea amara

Subspecies

- Kirkia burgeri subsp. burgeri

==== Zygophyllaceae ====
- Kallstroemia adscendens
- Neoluederitzia sericeocarpa
- Nitraria schoberi
- Zygophyllum giessii

=== Saxifragales ===
==== Altingiaceae ====
- Liquidambar chinensis
- Liquidambar gracilipes
- Liquidambar siamensis
- Liquidambar styraciflua, sweet gum

==== Hamamelidaceae ====
- Rhodoleia championii

==== Saxifragaceae ====
- Chrysosplenium americanum
- Chrysosplenium tetrandrum
- Saxifraga florulenta
- Saxifraga foliolosa
- Saxifraga hirculus, yellow marsh saxifrage
- Saxifraga vayredana

==== Other Saxifragales species ====
- Penthorum sedoides
- Ribes glandulosum
- Ribes janczewskii

=== Solanales ===
There are 48 species, one subspecies, and one variety in the order Solanales assessed as least concern.

==== Convolvulaceae ====
Species

- Aniseia martinicensis, whitejacket
- Calystegia sepium
- Convolvulus grantii
- Convolvulus hildebrandtii
- Convolvulus sarmentosus
- Cressa cretica
- Cuscuta acuta
- Cuscuta gronovii
- Cuscuta gymnocarpa
- Cuscuta kilimanjari
- Ipomoea aquatica
- Ipomoea coptica
- Ipomoea habeliana, lava morning glory
- Ipomoea linearifolia, arrow-leafed morning glory
- Ipomoea passifloroides
- Ipomoea pes-caprae
- Ipomoea prismatosyphon
- Merremia gangetica, kidney leaf morning glory
- Stictocardia tiliifolia

Varieties

- Cuscuta kilimanjari var. major

==== Hydrophyllaceae ====
- Hydrolea zeylanica

==== Menyanthaceae ====
- Fauria crista-galli
- Menyanthes trifoliata, buckbean
- Nymphoides aurantiaca
- Nymphoides brevipedicellata
- Nymphoides cordata
- Nymphoides ezannoi
- Nymphoides forbesiana
- Nymphoides hydrophylla
- Nymphoides indica, water-snowflake
- Nymphoides parvifolia
- Nymphoides peltata, fringed waterlily
- Nymphoides rautanenii
- Villarsia capensis

==== Polemoniaceae ====
- Navarretia leucocephala
- Polemonium acutiflorum
- Polemonium pulcherrimum
- Polemonium viscosum

==== Solanaceae ====
Species

- Capsicum frutescens
- Cestrum diurnum
- Exodeconus miersii, Galapagos shore petunia
- Lycium minimum, Galapagos lycium
- Lycium sokotranum
- Mandragora autumnalis, autumn mandrake
- Nicotiana africana
- Physalis galapagoensis
- Solanum galapagense
- Solanum minutifoliolum
- Solanum paucijugum
- Withania adunensis
- Withania riebeckii

Subspecies

- Solanum endopogon subsp. guianensis

=== Violales ===
Species

- Adenia globosa
- Adenia keramanthus
- Adenia kirkii
- Adenia lindiensis
- Adenia pechuelii
- Homalium acuminatum, Rarotonga homalium
- Homalium foetidum
- Homalium longifolium
- Homalium moto
- Homalium mouo
- Homalium rufescens
- Lacistema robustum
- Paropsia grewioides
- Passiflora indecora
- Passiflora monadelpha
- Passiflora smilacifolia
- Passiflora sprucei
- Rinorea dasyadena
- Schlechterina mitostemmatoides
- Tamarix androssowii
- Tamarix kotschyi
- Tamarix mascatensis
- Tamarix nilotica
- Tamarix octandra
- Tamarix parviflora
- Tamarix ramosissima
- Tamarix tetragyna, tamarisk
- Tamarix tetrandra
- Viola lanceolata
- Viola macloskeyi
- Viola maroccana
- Viola nephrophylla
- Viola obliqua
- Viola palustris
- Viola renifolia

Subspecies

- Adenia globosa subsp. globosa
- Viola rupestris subsp. relicta
- Xylosma suaveolens subsp. gracile
- Xylosma suaveolens subsp. pubigerum
- Xylosma suaveolens subsp. suaveolens

=== Vitales ===
- Cissus doeringii
- Cissus hamaderohensis
- Cissus paniculata
- Cissus subaphylla
- Cyphostemma bainesii
- Cyphostemma juttae
- Vitis vinifera, wild grape

== Monocotyledons ==
There are 1983 species, eight subspecies, and seven varieties of monocotyledon assessed as least concern.

=== Alismatales ===
There are 27 species in the order Alismatales assessed as least concern.

==== Alismataceae ====
- Alisma lanceolatum, narrow-leaved water-plantain
- Alisma plantago-aquatica, common water-plantain
- Alisma subcordatum
- Alisma triviale
- Burnatia enneandra
- Butomopsis latifolia
- Caldesia grandis
- Caldesia oligococca
- Caldesia parnassifolia
- Damasonium bourgaei
- Echinodorus emersus
- Limnophyton obtusifolium
- Luronium natans
- Ranalisma humile
- Sagittaria brevirostra
- Sagittaria cristata
- Sagittaria cuneata
- Sagittaria graminea
- Sagittaria guayanensis
- Sagittaria latifolia
- Sagittaria potamogetifolia
- Sagittaria pygmaea
- Sagittaria rigida
- Sagittaria sagittifolia
- Sagittaria trifolia
- Wiesneria triandra

==== Aponogetonaceae ====
- Aponogeton afroviolaceus
- Aponogeton crispus, crinkled aponogeton
- Aponogeton desertorum
- Aponogeton distachyos
- Aponogeton junceus
- Aponogeton lakhonensis
- Aponogeton natalensis
- Aponogeton natans, floating lace plant
- Aponogeton nudiflorus
- Aponogeton rehmannii
- Aponogeton stuhlmannii
- Aponogeton subconjugatus
- Aponogeton undulatus
- Aponogeton vallisnerioides

==== Butomaceae ====
- Butomus umbellatus, flowering-rush

==== Cymodoceaceae ====
- Amphibolis antarctica
- Amphibolis griffithii
- Cymodocea angustata
- Cymodocea nodosa, slender seagrass
- Cymodocea rotundata
- Cymodocea serrulata
- Halodule pinifolia
- Halodule uninervis
- Halodule wrightii
- Syringodium filiforme, manatee grass
- Syringodium isoetifolium
- Thalassodendron ciliatum
- Thalassodendron pachyrhizum

==== Hydrocharitaceae ====
- Blyxa aubertii, round fruit blyxa
- Blyxa japonica
- Blyxa octandra
- Elodea bifoliata
- Elodea canadensis
- Elodea nuttallii
- Enhalus acoroides
- Halophila australis
- Halophila capricorni
- Halophila decipiens, paddle grass
- Halophila minor
- Halophila ovalis
  - Johnson's seagrass, a clone of Halophila ovalis
- Halophila ovata
- Halophila spinulosa
- Halophila stipulacea
- Halophila tricostata
- Hydrilla verticillata, Indian stargrass
- Hydrocharis chevalieri
- Hydrocharis dubia
- Hydrocharis morsus-ranae, European frogbit
- Lagarosiphon cordofanus
- Lagarosiphon ilicifolius
- Lagarosiphon major
- Lagarosiphon verticillifolius
- Najas flexilis
- Najas gracillima
- Najas graminea, ricefield waternymph
- Najas guadalupensis
- Najas indica
- Najas malesiana
- Najas marina, holly-leaved naiad
- Najas minor
- Najas pectinata
- Najas schweinfurthii
- Najas tenuifolia, thin-leaved naiad
- Najas testui
- Nechamandra alternifolia
- Ottelia alismoides, duck-lettuce
- Ottelia cordata
- Ottelia fischeri
- Ottelia kunenensis
- Ottelia muricata
- Stratiotes aloides, water-soldier
- Thalassia hemprichii
- Thalassia testudinum
- Vallisneria americana
- Vallisneria natans
- Vallisneria spiralis, tapegrass

==== Juncaginaceae ====
- Triglochin bulbosa
- Triglochin maritima, sea arrowgrass
- Triglochin palustris, marsh arrowgrass
- Triglochin scilloides

==== Posidoniaceae ====
- Posidonia angustifolia
- Posidonia coriacea
- Posidonia denhartogii
- Posidonia kirkmanii
- Posidonia oceanica, Neptune grass
- Posidonia ostenfeldii

==== Potamogetonaceae ====
- Groenlandia densa, opposite-leaved pondweed
- Potamogeton alpinus, red pondweed
- Potamogeton amplifolius
- Potamogeton berchtoldii, small pondweed
- Potamogeton bicupulatus
- Potamogeton coloratus, fen pondweed
- Potamogeton confervoides
- Potamogeton crispus, curled pondweed
- Potamogeton distinctus
- Potamogeton epihydrus, American pondweed
- Potamogeton foliosus
- Potamogeton friesii, flat-stalked pondweed
- Potamogeton gramineus, various-leaved pondweed
- Potamogeton hillii
- Potamogeton lucens, shining pondweed
- Potamogeton maackianus
- Potamogeton natans, broad-leaved pondweed
- Potamogeton nodosus, Loddon pondweed
- Potamogeton oakesianus
- Potamogeton obtusifolius, blunt-leaved pondweed
- Potamogeton octandrus
- Potamogeton perfoliatus, perfoliate pondweed
- Potamogeton polygonifolius, bog pondweed
- Potamogeton praelongus, long-stalked pondweed
- Potamogeton pulcher
- Potamogeton pusillus, lesser pondweed
- Potamogeton richardsonii
- Potamogeton robbinsii
- Potamogeton schweinfurthii
- Potamogeton spirillus
- Potamogeton strictifolius
- Potamogeton subsibiricus
- Potamogeton trichoides, hairlike pondweed
- Potamogeton vaseyi
- Potamogeton wrightii
- Ruppia cirrhosa, spiral ditchgrass
- Ruppia maritima, beaked tasselweed
- Ruppia megacarpa, large-fruit seatassel
- Ruppia polycarpa
- Ruppia tuberosa
- Stuckenia amblyophyla
- Stuckenia filiformis, threadleaf-pondweed
- Stuckenia pectinata, fennel pondweed
- Stuckenia vaginata
- Zannichellia melitensis, Maltese horned pondweed
- Zannichellia palustris, horned pondweed
- Zannichellia peltata

==== Scheuchzeriaceae ====
- Scheuchzeria palustris

==== Zosteraceae ====
- Phyllospadix scouleri
- Phyllospadix serrulatus
- Phyllospadix torreyi
- Zostera japonica
- Zostera marina, eelgrass
- Zostera muelleri
- Zostera nigricaulis
- Zostera noltii, Zostera noltei
- Zostera pacifica, wide-leaved eelgrass
- Zostera polychlamys
- Zostera tasmanica

=== Arales ===
There are 103 species and one subspecies in Arales assessed as least concern.

==== Acoraceae ====
- Acorus calamus, sweet flag
- Acorus gramineus, Japanese sweet flag

==== Araceae ====
Species

- Aglaonema simplex
- Alocasia flabellifera
- Alocasia fornicata
- Alocasia odora
- Ambrosina bassii
- Amorphophallus paeoniifolius
- Amydrium hainanense
- Amydrium sinense
- Anchomanes abbreviatus
- Anthurium alatipedunculatum
- Anthurium bonplandii
- Anthurium cordiforme
- Anthurium crenatum, scalloped laceleaf
- Anthurium debilis
- Anthurium fasciale
- Anthurium gehrigeri
- Anthurium lhotzkyanum
- Anthurium lingua
- Anthurium ochreatum
- Anthurium palenquense
- Anthurium pallidiflorum
- Anthurium promininerve
- Anthurium rigidifolium
- Anthurium rugulosum
- Anthurium sagittatum
- Anthurium scabrinerve
- Anthurium sinuatum
- Anthurium sodiroanum
- Anthurium tremulum
- Anthurium umbricola
- Anubias barteri
- Anubias gilletii
- Anubias hastifolia
- Anubias heterophylla
- Aridarum purseglovei
- Arisaema heterophyllum, dancing crane cobra lily
- Arisaema jacquemontii, Jacquemont's cobra-lily
- Arisaema victoriae
- Arisaema yunnanense
- Calla palustris, bog arum
- Cercestis camerunensis
- Cercestis congensis
- Cercestis kamerunianus
- Colocasia esculenta, wild taro
- Colocasia fallax
- Cryptocoryne albida
- Cryptocoryne ciliata, water trumpet
- Cryptocoryne cordata
- Cryptocoryne crispatula
- Cryptocoryne retrospiralis
- Culcasia dinklagei
- Culcasia falcifolia
- Culcasia glandulosa
- Culcasia lanceolata
- Culcasia panduriformis
- Culcasia sapinii
- Culcasia scandens
- Culcasia striolata
- Culcasia tenuifolia
- Dracunculus vulgaris, dragon lily
- Gonatopus clavatus
- Homalomena lauterbachii
- Lagenandra ovata, Malayan sword
- Lagenandra toxicaria
- Lasia spinosa
- Lasimorpha senegalensis, swamp arum
- Lysichiton americanus
- Nephthytis poissonii
- Peltandra virginica
- Philodendron grandipes
- Philodendron guianense
- Philodendron hastatum
- Pistia stratiotes, water lettuce
- Pycnospatha arietina
- Sauromatum venosum, voodoo lily
- Scindapsus hederaceus
- Stylochaeton salaamicus
- Stylochaeton shabaensis
- Symplocarpus foetidus
- Typhonium flagelliforme
- Xanthosoma hylaeae
- Zantedeschia aethiopica
- Zantedeschia albomaculata

Subspecies

- Zantedeschia albomaculata subsp. macrocarpa

==== Lemnaceae ====
- Landoltia punctata, dotted duckweed
- Lemna aequinoctialis, lesser duckweed
- Lemna gibba, fat duckweed
- Lemna minor, common duckweed
- Lemna minuta
- Lemna perpusilla
- Lemna tenera
- Lemna trisulca, duckweed
- Lemna turionifera
- Spirodela polyrhiza, greater duckweed
- Wolffia angusta
- Wolffia arrhiza, rootless duckweed
- Wolffia borealis
- Wolffia brasiliensis
- Wolffia columbiana
- Wolffia globosa
- Wolffiella denticulata
- Wolffiella hyalina

=== Arecales ===
Species

- Acoelorraphe wrightii
- Aiphanes hirsuta
- Aiphanes linearis
- Aiphanes ulei
- Areca macrocalyx
- Areca triandra
- Asterogyne ramosa
- Astrocaryum aculeatissimum
- Astrocaryum mexicanum
- Astrocaryum standleyanum
- Astrocaryum urostachys
- Attalea funifera, piassava palm
- Attalea oleifera
- Bactris acanthocarpa
- Bactris acanthocarpoides
- Bactris balanophora
- Bactris barronis
- Bactris bidentula
- Bactris bifida
- Bactris brongniartii
- Bactris coloradonis
- Bactris concinna
- Bactris constanciae
- Bactris corossilla
- Bactris dianeura
- Bactris fissifrons
- Bactris glaucescens
- Bactris hirta
- Bactris maraja
- Bactris mexicana
- Bactris pilosa
- Bactris plumeriana
- Bactris ptariana
- Bactris riparia
- Bactris tomentosa
- Bactris turbinocarpa
- Balaka longirostris
- Balaka seemannii
- Basselinia eriostachys
- Basselinia pancheri
- Basselinia sordida
- Bismarckia nobilis
- Brahea armata
- Brahea brandegeei
- Brahea calcarea
- Brahea decumbens
- Brahea dulcis
- Brahea edulis
- Brahea moorei
- Calamus caryotoides, fishtail lawyer cane
- Calamus heteracanthus
- Calamus modestus
- Calamus oxleyanus
- Calamus pogonacanthus
- Calamus salicifolius
- Calamus semoi
- Calamus siamensis
- Calamus tenuis
- Calamus usitatus
- Calyptronoma rivalis
- Caryota mitis
- Caryota no
- Caryota urens, fishtail palm
- Chamaedorea alternans
- Chamaedorea carchensis
- Chamaedorea cataractarum, cascade palm
- Chamaedorea elatior
- Chamaedorea ibarrae
- Chamaedorea keelerorum
- Chamaedorea liebmannii
- Chamaedorea microspadix
- Chamaedorea nubium
- Chamaedorea pinnatifrons
- Chamaedorea pochutlensis
- Clinostigma exorrhizum
- Coccothrinax argentata
- Coccothrinax argentea
- Coccothrinax gundlachii
- Copernicia baileyana
- Copernicia rigida
- Copernicia tectorum
- Corypha utan
- Cyrtostachys glauca
- Dypsis baronii
- Dypsis catatiana
- Dypsis coursii
- Dypsis fibrosa
- Dypsis forficifolia
- Dypsis lastelliana
- Dypsis madagascariensis
- Dypsis nodifera
- Dypsis pachyramea
- Dypsis pinnatifrons
- Dypsis spicata
- Eremospatha hookeri
- Geonoma baculifera
- Geonoma undata
- Iriartea deltoidea
- Itaya amicorum
- Leucothrinax morrisii
- Licuala malajana
- Licuala telifera
- Livistona lorophylla
- Livistona saribus
- Livistona speciosa
- Marojejya insignis
- Metroxylon warburgii
- Nephrosperma vanhoutteanum
- Nypa fruticans, nypa palm
- Orania longisquama
- Phoenicophorium borsigianum, thief palm
- Phoenix canariensis
- Phoenix reclinata
- Pholidocarpus majadum
- Pinanga patula
- Pinanga sylvestris
- Plectocomia himalayana
- Plectocomiopsis triquetra
- Prestoea acuminata
- Ptychococcus paradoxus
- Ptychosperma microcarpum
- Raphia mambillensis
- Ravenea madagascariensis
- Ravenea sambiranensis
- Roystonea dunlapiana
- Sabal domingensis
- Sabal palmetto
- Syagrus picrophylla
- Syagrus pseudococos
- Syagrus romanzoffiana
- Syagrus ruschiana
- Syagrus smithii
- Thrinax radiata
- Trachycarpus fortunei
- Veitchia joannis, Joannis palm
- Veitchia macdanielsii
- Veitchia vitiensis
- Wallichia triandra
- Wettinia anomala
- Wettinia disticha
- Wettinia drudei
- Wettinia fascicularis
- Wettinia kalbreyeri

Varieties

- Prestoea pubens var. pubens

=== Asparagales ===
==== Amaryllidaceae ====
Species

- Acis autumnalis, autumn snowflake
- Allium acutiflorum
- Allium autumnale
- Allium chinense
- Allium colchicifolium
- Allium fasciculatum
- Allium geyeri
- Allium grosii
- Allium melanantherum
- Allium moly, lily leek
- Allium mongolicum
- Allium rouyi
- Allium rubrovittatum
- Allium stearnii
- Allium suaveolens
- Allium tardans
- Allium willeanum
- Crinum balfourii
- Crinum crassicaule
- Crinum firmifolium
- Crinum lorifolium
- Crinum paludosum
- Crinum politifolium
- Crinum variabile
- Crinum viviparum, river crinum lily
- Cyrtanthus sanguineus
- Galanthus plicatus
- Gethyllis britteniana
- Haemanthus avasmontanus
- Leucojum aestivum, summer snowflake
- Leucojum vernum, spring snowflake
- Narcissus assoanus
- Narcissus asturiensis
- Narcissus calcicola
- Narcissus cyclamineus
- Narcissus poeticus, pheasant's-eye narcissus
- Narcissus scaberulus
- Narcissus triandrus
- Strumaria barbarae
- Strumaria hardyana
- Strumaria phonolithica

Subspecies

- Narcissus pseudonarcissus subsp. nobilis

==== Asparagaceae ====
- Agave colorata
- Agave lechuguilla, lecheguilla agave
- Agave shawii
- Asparagus aethiopicus
- Asparagus faulknerae
- Asparagus umbellatus
- Brodiaea minor, dwarf brodiaea
- Chlorophytum cameronii
- Chlorophytum filipendulum
- Chlorophytum graptophyllum
- Chlorophytum holstii
- Chlorophytum hysteranthum
- Chlorophytum limosum
- Chlorophytum recurvifolium
- Chlorophytum ruahense
- Chlorophytum subpetiolatum
- Chlorophytum tuberosum
- Chlorophytum viscosum
- Dipcadi guichardii
- Dracaena afromontana
- Dracaena camerooniana
- Dracaena cerasifera
- Drimia namibensis
- Drimia secunda
- Drimia undata
- Drimia uniflora, fairy bell
- Echeandia flavescens, Torrey's craglily
- Echeandia parviflora
- Eriospermum andongense
- Eriospermum buchubergense
- Eriospermum citrinum
- Eriospermum flexum
- Eriospermum lavranosii
- Eriospermum mackenii
- Lachenalia klinghardtiana
- Lachenalia namibiensis
- Lachenalia nordenstamii
- Lachenalia nutans
- Ledebouria grandifolia
- Ornithogalum broteroi
- Scilla madeirensis

Subspecies

- Bellevalia dubia subsp. hackelii

==== Asphodelaceae ====
Species

- Aloe argenticauda
- Aloe breviscapa
- Aloe calidophila
- Aloe camperi
- Aloe citrina
- Aloe clarkei
- Aloe corallina
- Aloe debrana
- Aloe dewinteri
- Aloe dinteri
- Aloe diolii
- Aloe djiboutiensis
- Aloe elegans
- Aloe elegantissima
- Aloe elkerriana
- Aloe ellenbeckii
- Aloe ericahenriettae
- Aloe eumassawana
- Aloe gilbertii
- Aloe glabrescens
- Aloe heybensis
- Aloe kahinii
- Aloe labworana
- Aloe lateritia
- Aloe leedalii
- Aloe macleayi
- Aloe macrocarpa
- Aloe mcloughlinii
- Aloe megalacantha
- Aloe microdonta
- Aloe miskatana
- Aloe mubendiensis
- Aloe namibensis
- Aloe otallensis
- Aloe parvidens
- Aloe pirottae
- Aloe rabaiensis
- Aloe rigens
- Aloe rivae
- Aloe ruspoliana
- Aloe schweinfurthii
- Aloe secundiflora
- Aloe sladeniana
- Aloe trichosantha
- Aloe trigonantha
- Aloe tweedieae
- Aloe viridiflora
- Aloe vituensis
- Aloe volkensii
- Aloe wrefordii
- Aloe zebrina
- Asphodelus aestivus
- Asphodelus fistulosus, onionweed
- Bulbine caput-medusae
- Bulbine favosa
- Bulbine francescae
- Bulbine namaensis

Subspecies

- Aloe gilbertii subsp. gilbertii
- Aloe megalacantha subsp. megalacantha

==== Iridaceae ====
- Babiana longicollis
- Babiana scabrifolia
- Babiana sinuata
- Babiana socotrana
- Babiana striata
- Calydorea crocoides
- Crocus cvijicii
- Dierama latifolium
- Freesia corymbosa, common freesia
- Geissorhiza schinzii
- Gladiolus italicus, common sword lily
- Gladiolus oppositiflorus
- Gladiolus patersoniae
- Gladiolus rupicola
- Iris brevicaulis
- Iris histrio
- Iris missouriensis
- Iris palaestina
- Iris prismatica
- Iris pseudacorus, yellow iris
- Iris spuria, blue iris
- Iris versicolor
- Iris virginica
- Mastigostyla shepardiae
- Moraea garipensis
- Moraea graniticola
- Moraea hexaglottis
- Moraea huttonii
- Moraea iringensis
- Romulea requienii

==== Orchidaceae ====
- Acianthera chrysantha
- Acianthera hondurensis
- Acianthera saundersiana
- Acianthera scalpricaulis
- Acianthera violacea
- Aeranthes ecalcarata
- Agrostophyllum cyathiforme
- Anacamptis palustris
- Anathallis minutalis, insignificant pleurothallis
- Ancistrorhynchus parviflorus
- Angraecum aporoides
- Angraecum bancoense
- Angraecum compactum
- Angraecum distichum
- Angraecum gabonense
- Angraecum podochiloides
- Angraecum subulatum
- Appendicula calcarata
- Appendicula longirostrata
- Barkeria naevosa, veined barkeria
- Basiphyllaea corallicola, Carter's orchid
- Bletia ensifolia
- Brachionidium phalangiferum
- Brassia verrucosa, warty brassia
- Bromheadia finlaysoniana
- Bryobium eriaeoides
- Bulbophyllum baronii
- Bulbophyllum betchei
- Bulbophyllum bicoloratum
- Bulbophyllum cauliflorum
- Bulbophyllum delitescens, straight twist orchid
- Bulbophyllum encephalodes
- Bulbophyllum erinaceum
- Bulbophyllum fritillariiflorum
- Bulbophyllum ischnopus
- Bulbophyllum leopardinum, leopard spotted bulbophyllum
- Bulbophyllum lizae
- Bulbophyllum macranthum
- Bulbophyllum minutissimum, red bead orchid
- Bulbophyllum multiflorum
- Bulbophyllum radicans, stripped pyjama orchid
- Bulbophyllum regnellii
- Bulbophyllum renkinianum
- Bulbophyllum restrepia
- Caladenia brownii, kari spider orchid
- Caladenia catenata, white caladenia
- Caladenia citrina, Margaret River spider orchid
- Caladenia cracens, neat caps
- Caladenia dimorpha, spicy caps
- Caladenia incensa, glistening spider orchid
- Caladenia mesocera, narrow-lipped dragon orchid
- Caladenia radialis, drooping spider orchid
- Caladenia radiata, ray spider orchid
- Caladenia splendens, splendid spider orchid
- Calanthe madagascariensis
- Calopogon multiflorus, many-flowered grass-pink orchid
- Campylocentrum tyrridion
- Catasetum barbatum, bearded catasetum
- Chamorchis alpina, alpine chamorchis
- Cheirostylis orobanchoides
- Claderia viridiflora
- Cleistes ionoglossa
- Coelogyne foerstermannii
- Coelogyne rigida, rigid coelogyne
- Conchidium pusillum, small eria
- Corybas gastrosiphon
- Corycium flanaganii
- Cyclopogon longibracteatus, long bracted cyclopogon
- Cymbidiella falcigera
- Cymbidium tracyanum
- Cynorkis gibbosa
- Cynorkis gigas
- Cynorkis lindleyana
- Cynorkis peyrotii
- Cynorkis pleistadenia
- Cypripedium acaule, mocassin flower
- Cypripedium calceolus, lady's slipper orchid
- Cypripedium guttatum, pink lady slipper
- Cypripedium macranthos
- Cypripedium parviflorum, American yellow lady's-slipper
- Cypripedium reginae, showy lady's slipper
- Cypripedium tibeticum, Tibetan cypripedium
- Cyrtochilum halteratum
- Cyrtopodium brandonianum
- Dactylorhiza cordigera, heart shaped lip dactylorhiza
- Dactylorhiza elata, stately dactylorhiza
- Dactylorhiza foliosa, richly-leaved dactylorhiza
- Dactylorhiza lapponica, Lapland marsh orchid
- Dactylorhiza sambucina, elder-flowered orchid
- Dendrobium aloifolium, aloe-like dendrobium
- Dendrobium aphyllum
- Dendrobium bensoniae
- Dendrobium incurvum
- Dendrobium lancifolium
- Dendrobium lewisiae
- Dendrobium litorale, coastal dendrobium
- Dendrobium melinanthum
- Dendrobium poneroides
- Diaphananthe meliantha
- Didymoplexis africana
- Disa bodkinii
- Disa erubescens, rose disa
- Disa katangensis
- Disa nyikensis
- Disa thodei
- Disa walleri
- Disperis elaphoceras
- Elleanthus oliganthus, sparse blooming elleanthus
- Encyclia phoenicea, Phoenician encyclia
- Encyclia spatella
- Epidendrum criniferum, bract carrying epidendrum
- Epidendrum geminiflorum
- Epidendrum gentryi
- Epidendrum microphyllum
- Epidendrum oerstedii
- Epidendrum proligerum
- Epipactis albensis
- Epipactis leptochila, narrow-lipped helleborine
- Epipactis muelleri, Mueller's epipactis
- Epipactis palustris, marsh helleborine
- Epipactis phyllanthes, green-flowered helleborine
- Epipactis purpurata, violet helleborine
- Epipactis veratrifolia, eastern marsh helleborine
- Erythrodes blumei
- Erythrorchis altissima
- Eulophia katangensis
- Eulophia ramosa
- Eulophia reticulata
- Eulophia speciosa
- Eurycentrum atroviride
- Eurycentrum obscurum
- Galeottia fimbriata
- Geodorum recurvum
- Glomera oligantha
- Gomesa sessilis
- Gymnadenia frivaldii, Frivald's gymnadenia
- Gymnadenia odoratissima, short spurred fragrant orchid
- Gymnadenia rhellicani
- Habenaria armatissima
- Habenaria dusenii
- Habenaria glazioviana
- Habenaria monorrhiza
- Habenaria parviflora, small flowered habenaria
- Habenaria pleiophylla
- Habenaria retroflexa
- Habenaria socotrana
- Habenaria supplicans
- Habenaria tridactylites
- Habenaria virens
- Helonoma bifida
- Hetaeria heterosepala
- Himantoglossum adriaticum
- Holothrix filicornis
- Huntleya burtii
- Inti chartacifolia
- Leochilus leochilinus
- Lepanthes lindleyana
- Lepanthes mucronata
- Ligeophila stigmatoptera, winged stigma liogeophila
- Liparis petelotii
- Liparis swenssonii, northern tom cat
- Lueddemannia pescatorei
- Macradenia paraensis
- Malaxis brachystachys, Madrean adder's mouth
- Malaxis javesiae
- Masdevallia strumifera, goiter carrying masdevallia
- Maxillaria angustisegmenta, narrow segmented maxillaria
- Mormolyca acutifolia, rufous tiger orchid
- Mormolyca hedwigiae
- Neotinea ustulata
- Neottia nidus-avis, bird's-nest orchid
- Octomeria taracuana
- Oeceoclades maculata, ground orchid
- Oeonia brauniana
- Oncidium ensatum
- Oncidium lancifolium
- Oncidium tenuifolium
- Ophrys bertolonii, Bertoloni's ophrys
- Ophrys insectifera, fly orchid
- Orchis brancifortii, Branciforti's orchid
- Orleanesia amazonica
- Ornithidium nubigenum
- Palmorchis imuyaensis
- Palmorchis trilobulata
- Pedilochilus papuanus
- Pelexia orthosepala
- Phaius corymbioides
- Pholidota camelostalix
- Pholidota globosa
- Phragmipedium boissierianum, Boissier's phragmipedium
- Phragmipedium lindenii
- Phragmipedium longifolium, long-leaf phragmipedium
- Phragmipedium pearcei, Pearce's phragmipedium
- Phragmipedium vittatum, striped phragmipedium
- Phreatia constricta
- Phreatia plantaginifolia
- Pinalia fitzalanii, common fuzz orchid
- Pinalia szetschuanica
- Platanthera bifolia
- Platanthera leucophaea, eastern prairie white-fringed orchid
- Platanthera tipuloides, Aleutian bog orchid
- Platycoryne mediocris
- Platystele minimiflora
- Pleurothallis carinifera, keeled pleurothallis
- Pleurothallis rowleei
- Plocoglottis borneensis
- Plocoglottis copelandii
- Podochilus khasianus
- Polystachya albescens
- Polystachya caespitifica
- Polystachya modesta
- Pomatocalpa maculosum
- Prasophyllum giganteum, bronze leek orchid
- Prasophyllum mimulum, highland leek orchid
- Pteroceras simondianum
- Pterostylis acuminata, pointed greenhood
- Pterostylis erecta, upright maroonhood
- Pterostylis hispidula, small nodding greenhood
- Pterostylis mutica, midget greenhood
- Pterostylis praetermissa, Mount Kaputar rusty hood
- Pterostylis squamata, ruddy greenhood
- Restrepia trichoglossa, hairy tongued restrepia
- Sarcochilus falcatus, orange blossom orchid
- Sauroglossum nitidum
- Scaphyglottis sickii, Sicks scaphyglottis
- Skeptrostachys arechavaletanii
- Sobralia stenophylla, thin leafed sobralia
- Specklinia brighamii
- Specklinia corniculata, small horned pleurothallis
- Specklinia picta
- Spiranthes casei, Case's ladies'-tresses
- Spiranthes diluvialis, Ute lady's tresses
- Spiranthes sinensis, Chinese spiranthes
- Spiranthes torta
- Stelis immersa, sunken pleurothallis
- Stelis magdalenae
- Stelis ruprechtiana
- Stelis tenuilabris
- Taeniophyllum gracillimum
- Tainia hongkongensis, purple bulb orchid
- Thelymitra cyanea, blue sun-orchid
- Thelymitra papuana
- Tolumnia guibertiana
- Tolumnia variegata, variegated oncidium
- Trichoglottis smithii
- Trichoglottis winkleri
- Trichopilia marginata, rimmed trichopilia
- Trichopilia turialbae
- Tridactyle flabellata
- Tridactyle phaeocephala
- Tropidia saprophytica
- Vanda hindsii, Cape York wanda
- Vanda tessellata, grey orchid
- Vanilla phalaenopsis
- Zeuxine amboinensis
- Zeuxine strateumatica
- Zygopetalum crinitum

==== Other Asparagales species ====
- Curculigo seychellensis
- Kabuyea hostifolia
- Spiloxene aquatica
- Xanthorrhoea drummondii

=== Bromeliales ===
Species

- Aechmea abbreviata
- Billbergia viridiflora
- Brewcaria hohenbergioides
- Brocchinia gilmartiniae
- Dyckia lagoensis
- Dyckia saxatilis
- Encholirium spectabile
- Greigia van-hyningii
- Guzmania asplundii
- Guzmania calamifolia
- Guzmania calothyrsus
- Guzmania jaramilloi
- Guzmania macropoda
- Guzmania remyi
- Guzmania sibundoyorum
- Neoregelia bahiana
- Neoregelia laevis
- Pitcairnia arcuata
- Pitcairnia fusca
- Pitcairnia macranthera
- Pitcairnia moritziana
- Pitcairnia nigra
- Puya aequatorialis
- Puya eryngioides
- Puya glomerifera
- Puya maculata
- Puya retrorsa
- Ronnbergia columbiana
- Tillandsia andrieuxii
- Tillandsia brachycaulos
- Tillandsia capitata
- Tillandsia chaetophylla
- Tillandsia cornuta
- Tillandsia fasciculata, cardinal air plant
- Tillandsia foliosa
- Tillandsia geminiflora
- Tillandsia insignis
- Tillandsia insularis, Galapagos tillandsia
- Tillandsia ionantha, blushing bride
- Tillandsia latifolia
- Tillandsia limbata
- Tillandsia macrodactylon
- Tillandsia michelii
- Tillandsia reichenbachii
- Tillandsia rhomboidea
- Vriesea bituminosa
- Vriesea heliconioides

Varieties

- Tillandsia fasciculata var. clavispica, clubspike cardinal airplant

=== Commelinales ===
There are 39 species in the order Commelinales assessed as least concern.

==== Commelinaceae ====
- Callisia gracilis
- Commelina africana
- Commelina benghalensis, day flower
- Commelina caroliniana
- Commelina clavata, willow leaved dayflower
- Commelina diffusa, climbing dayflower
- Commelina erecta, white mouth dayflower
- Commelina imberbis
- Commelina subulata
- Cyanotis arcotensis
- Cyanotis axillaris
- Cyanotis cristata
- Cyanotis cucullata
- Cyanotis fasciculata
- Cyanotis papilionacea
- Floscopa scandens, climbing flower cup
- Murdannia esculenta
- Murdannia pauciflora
- Murdannia semiteres
- Murdannia spirata
- Murdannia vaginata
- Tradescantia occidentalis
- Tripogandra montana

==== Pontederiaceae ====
- Heteranthera callifolia, mud plantain
- Heteranthera dubia
- Monochoria africana
- Monochoria brevipetiolata
- Monochoria cyanea
- Monochoria hastata, leaf pondweed
- Monochoria korsakowii
- Monochoria vaginalis, pickerel weed

==== Other Commellinales ====
- Hanguana malayana
- Lachnanthes caroliniana

=== Dioscoreales ===
==== Burmanniaceae ====
- Burmannia coelestis
- Burmannia disticha
- Burmannia grandiflora
- Burmannia pusilla
- Gymnosiphon cymosus
- Gymnosiphon suaveolens

==== Dioscoreaceae ====
- Dioscorea bernoulliana
- Dioscorea lanata
- Dioscorea longituba
- Dioscorea ovinala
- Dioscorea pseudomacrocapsa
- Dioscorea quartiniana
- Dioscorea sericea
- Dioscorea stipulosa
- Dioscorea tenuifolia
- Dioscorea trilinguis
- Dioscorea wallichii
- Tacca leontopetaloides, arrowroot

==== Other Dioscoreales ====
- Aletris glabra

=== Liliales ===
==== Colchicaceae ====
- Colchicum arenarium, sand saffron
- Colchicum autumnale, meadow saffron
- Colchicum balansae
- Disporum calcaratum
- Gloriosa superba, flame lily
- Iphigenia socotrana

==== Liliaceae ====
- Calochortus pringlei
- Calochortus purpureus
- Fritillaria rhodocanakis
- Gagea afghanica
- Gagea algeriensis, Algerian gagea
- Gagea amblyopetala, blunt-flowered gagea
- Gagea chomutovae
- Gagea cossoniana, Wilczek's gagea
- Gagea durieui
- Gagea foliosa, leafy gagea
- Gagea graeca
- Gagea granatellii, Granatelli's gagea
- Gagea kunawurensis
- Gagea lacaitae, Lacaita's gagea
- Gagea libanotica
- Gagea lojaconoi
- Gagea neopopovii
- Gagea nevadensis
- Gagea peruzzii, Peruzzi's gagea
- Gagea ramulosa, branched gagea
- Gagea reverchonii, Reverchon's gagea
- Gagea rigida, stiff gagea
- Gagea subtrigona
- Gagea tisoniana
- Lilium pomponium
- Lloydia triflora

==== Other Liliales species ====
Species

- Bomarea superba
- Veratrum mengtzeanum

Subspecies

- Veratrum mengtzeanum subsp. mengtzeanum

=== Pandanales ===
- Asplundia euryspatha
- Asplundia helicotricha
- Asplundia peruviana
- Carludovica palmata, Panama hat plant
- Freycinetia bicolor
- Freycinetia tenella
- Pandanus boninensis
- Pandanus kirkii
- Pandanus odorifer
- Pandanus tectorius
- Pandanus temehaniensis

=== Poales ===
There are 825 species and two varieties in Cyperales assessed as least concern.

==== Cyperaceae ====
- Abildgaardia ovata, syn. Fimbristylis ovata
- Actinoscirpus grossus, giant bur rush
- Alinula malawica
- Amphiscirpus nevadensis, Nevada bulrush
- Ascolepis capensis
- Ascolepis elata
- Ascolepis lineariglumis
- Blysmus compressus, flat-sedge
- Bolboschoenus glaucus, tuberous bulrush
- Bolboschoenus laticarpus
- Bolboschoenus maritimus
- Bulbostylis boeckleriana
- Bulbostylis capillaris, densetuft hairsedge
- Bulbostylis densa
- Bulbostylis emmerichiae
- Bulbostylis hispidula
- Bulbostylis igneotonsa
- Bulbostylis lichtensteiniana
- Bulbostylis schoenoides
- Bulbostylis turbinata, hair sedge
- Carex acuta, slender tufted-sedge
- Carex acutiformis, lesser pond-sedge
- Carex aethiopica
- Carex albula, blonde sedge
- Carex alopecoidea
- Carex anthoxanthea, grassy-slope Arctic sedge
- Carex aperta
- Carex appropinquata
- Carex aquatilis, aquatic sedge
- Carex arapahoensis, Arapaho sedge
- Carex arcta, northern clustered sedge
- Carex arctiformis
- Carex atherodes, wheat sedge
- Carex atlantica, prickly bog sedge
- Carex atrofuscoides
- Carex austroafricana
- Carex baccans, crimson seeded sedge
- Carex bebbii, Bebb's sedge
- Carex bequaertii
- Carex bicolor
- Carex borbonica
- Carex borii
- Carex brunnescens
- Carex bulbostylis, false hair sedge
- Carex buxbaumii, club sedge
- Carex caespitosa
- Carex canescens, white sedge
- Carex chordorrhiza
- Carex cilicica
- Carex clavata
- Carex cognata
- Carex comosa, bristly sedge
- Carex conferta
- Carex conoidea, open field sedge
- Carex crinita, fringed sedge
- Carex cryptolepis, northeastern sedge
- Carex cusickii, Cusick's sedge
- Carex davalliana
- Carex debilis, white-edge sedge
- Carex dianae, Diana's peak grass
- Carex diandra
- Carex digitalis, slender woodland sedge
- Carex diluta
- Carex distachya
- Carex distans
- Carex divisa
- Carex echinata, star sedge
- Carex elata
- Carex emoryi, Emory's sedge
- Carex erythrorrhiza
- Carex exilis, coastal sedge
- Carex exsiccata
- Carex extensa
- Carex filicina
- Carex fissa, hammock sedge
- Carex flava, large yellow-sedge
- Carex folliculata, northern long sedge
- Carex gayana
- Carex glareosa, lesser saltmarsh sedge
- Carex granularis, granular sedge
- Carex gynandra, mountain fringed sedge
- Carex gynocrates, northern bog sedge
- Carex haydenii, Hayden's sedge
- Carex hebecarpa
- Carex hebes, dry land sedge
- Carex hispida
- Carex holostoma, Arctic marsh sedge
- Carex hyalinolepis, shoreline sedge
- Carex hystericina
- Carex indiciformis
- Carex interior, inland sedge
- Carex intumescens, greater bladder sedge
- Carex japonica
- Carex lachenalii, twotipped sedge
- Carex lacustris, lake bank sedge
- Carex laevivaginata, smoothsheath sedge
- Carex lageniformis
- Carex lasiocarpa
- Carex lenticularis, shore sedge
- Carex leptalea, bristly-stalked sedge
- Carex limosa
- Carex lindleyana
- Carex livida, pale sedge
- Carex loliacea, ryegrass sedge
- Carex longipes
- Carex lophocarpa
- Carex louisianica, Louisiana sedge
- Carex lupulina, hop sedge
- Carex lurida, sallow sedge
- Carex luridiformis
- Carex luzulina, woodrush sedge
- Carex lycurus
- Carex lyngbyei, Lyngbye's sedge
- Carex macrochaeta, Alaska large awn sedge
- Carex macrostyla
- Carex maculata
- Carex magellanica
- Carex malato-belizii
- Carex maorica, Maori sedge
- Carex marina, seashore sedge
- Carex melinacra
- Carex michauxiana, Miochaux's sedge
- Carex microcarpa
- Carex microglochin
- Carex montis-everesti
- Carex myosurus
- Carex nebrascensis, Nebraska sedge
- Carex nigerrima
- Carex nigra, common sedge
- Carex normalis, greater straw sedge
- Carex norvegica, alpine sedge
- Carex obnupta, slough sedge
- Carex oederi
- Carex oedipostyla
- Carex oligosperma, fewseed sedge
- Carex orbicularis
- Carex otrubae
- Carex paleacea, chaffy sedge
- Carex paniculata, greater tussock-sedge
- Carex panormitana
- Carex parryana, Parry's sedge
- Carex pauciflora, few-flowered sedge
- Carex pedunculata, longstalk sedge
- Carex pellita, woolly sedge
- Carex phacota
- Carex pluriflora, severalflower sedge
- Carex prairea, prairie sedge
- Carex prasina, drooping sedge
- Carex pseudocyperus, cyperus sedge
- Carex pseudofoetida
- Carex punctata, dotted sedge
- Carex rariflora, mountain bog-sedge
- Carex remota
- Carex retrorsa, knot-sheath sedge
- Carex rigidioides
- Carex riparia, greater pond-sedge
- Carex rossii, Ross' sedge
- Carex rostrata
- Carex rotundata, round-fruited sedge
- Carex sartwellii, Sartwell's sedge
- Carex saxatilis, russet sedge
- Carex scabrata, scabrous sedge
- Carex simensis
- Carex simulata, analogue sedge
- Carex songorica
- Carex stenophylla
- Carex sterilis, sterile sedge
- Carex stipata, awl-fruited sedge
- Carex stricta, tussock sedge
- Carex stylosa, long-styled sedge
- Carex subspathacea, Hoppner's sedge
- Carex tenuiflora, sparse-flowered sedge
- Carex thouarsii
- Carex trisperma, three-seeded sedge
- Carex tuckermanii, Tuckerman's sedge
- Carex umbrosa
- Carex utriculata, common yellow lake sedge
- Carex vaginata, sheathed sedge
- Carex vesicaria
- Carex vixdentata
- Carex vulpina, true fox sedge
- Carex vulpinoidea, brown fox sedge
- Carex wiegandii, Wiegand's sedge
- Carpha capitellata
- Carpha glomerata
- Cladium mariscoides, smooth sawgrass
- Cladium mariscus, great fen-sedge
- Costularia hornei
- Cyathochaeta diandra, sheath rush
- Cyperus alopecuroides, foxtail sedge
- Cyperus alternifolius
- Cyperus alulatus
- Cyperus amabilis
- Cyperus anderssonii, Andersson's sedge
- Cyperus appendiculatus
- Cyperus arenarius
- Cyperus articulatus, jointed flatsedge
- Cyperus aterrimus
- Cyperus berroi
- Cyperus camphoratus
- Cyperus castaneus
- Cyperus cephalotes
- Cyperus clarkei
- Cyperus clavinux
- Cyperus compactus
- Cyperus compressus, poorland flatsedge
- Cyperus congensis
- Cyperus cylindrostachyus
- Cyperus cyperoides
- Cyperus dentatus, toothed flatsedge
- Cyperus difformis, smallflower umbrella sedge
- Cyperus diffusus, dwarf umbrella grass
- Cyperus digitatus, finger flatsegde
- Cyperus dilatatus
- Cyperus distans, slender cyperus
- Cyperus drummondii, green flat sedge
- Cyperus dubius
- Cyperus elatus
- Cyperus enervis
- Cyperus eragrostis, tall flatsedge
- Cyperus erythrorhizos, red-root flatsedge
- Cyperus esculentus, yellow nutsedge
- Cyperus fuscus, brown galingale
- Cyperus glaber
- Cyperus glaucophyllus
- Cyperus glomeratus
- Cyperus grandibulbosus
- Cyperus grayi, Gray's flat sedge
- Cyperus guianensis
- Cyperus hamulosus
- Cyperus imbricatus, shingle flatsegde
- Cyperus iria
- Cyperus kerstenii
- Cyperus laevigatus, smooth flatsedge
- Cyperus longus, sweet cyperus
- Cyperus maderaspatanus
- Cyperus meeboldii
- Cyperus michelianus
- Cyperus mitis
- Cyperus mollipes
- Cyperus nipponicus
- Cyperus nutans
- Cyperus pangorei
- Cyperus paniceus
- Cyperus papyrus, papyrus sedge
- Cyperus pilosus
- Cyperus plateilema
- Cyperus platyphyllus
- Cyperus podocarpus
- Cyperus procerus
- Cyperus pulchellus
- Cyperus pustulatus
- Cyperus reduncus
- Cyperus rigidifolius
- Cyperus rotundus
- Cyperus rubicundus
- Cyperus schimperianus, Schimper flatsedge
- Cyperus sphaerospermus
- Cyperus squarrosus
- Cyperus stoloniferus
- Cyperus strigosus, strawcolored flatsedge
- Cyperus tenuiculmis
- Cyperus tenuispica
- Cyperus textilis
- Cyperus tuberosus, purple nut sedge
- Cyperus turrillii
- Cyperus zollingeri, roadside flatsedge
- Diplacrum caricinum
- Dulichium arundinaceum, three way sedge
- Eleocharis acicularis
- Eleocharis argyrolepis
- Eleocharis atropurpurea
- Eleocharis brainii
- Eleocharis caduca
- Eleocharis carniolica
- Eleocharis complanata
- Eleocharis compressa, flat-stem spike-rush
- Eleocharis congesta
- Eleocharis decoriglumis
- Eleocharis deightonii
- Eleocharis densa
- Eleocharis dregeana
- Eleocharis elliptica, elliptic spikerush
- Eleocharis erythropoda, bald spikerush
- Eleocharis flavescens, wrinkle-sheathed spike-rush
- Eleocharis geniculata, Canada spikesedge
- Eleocharis intermedia, matted spikerush
- Eleocharis lankana
- Eleocharis macrantha
- Eleocharis macrostachya, creeping spikerush
- Eleocharis marginulata
- Eleocharis minarum
- Eleocharis mitracarpa
- Eleocharis obtusa, blunt spikerush
- Eleocharis ochrostachys
- Eleocharis palustris, common spike-rush
- Eleocharis quinqueflora, few-flowered spike-rush
- Eleocharis retroflexa
- Eleocharis robbinsii, Robbins' spikerush
- Eleocharis rostellata, beaked spikerush
- Eleocharis sellowiana
- Eleocharis spiralis
- Eleocharis suksdorfiana, Suksdorf's spikerush
- Eleocharis uniglumis, slender spike-rush
- Eriophorum angustifolium
- Eriophorum callitrix, Arctic cottongrass
- Eriophorum chamissonis, Chamisso's cottongrass
- Eriophorum latifolium
- Eriophorum tenellum, few-nerved cottongrass
- Eriophorum vaginatum, sheathed cottongrass
- Eriophorum virginicum, tawny cottongrass
- Eriophorum viridicarinatum, green-keeled cottongrass
- Ficinia capillifolia
- Fimbristylis acuminata
- Fimbristylis alboviridis
- Fimbristylis aphylla
- Fimbristylis argentea
- Fimbristylis autumnalis, slender fimbry
- Fimbristylis bisumbellata
- Fimbristylis cinnamometorum
- Fimbristylis complanata
- Fimbristylis consanguinea
- Fimbristylis costiglumis
- Fimbristylis cymosa
- Fimbristylis dichotoma
- Fimbristylis dipsacea, Harper's fimbristylis
- Fimbristylis ferruginea
- Fimbristylis kingii
- Fimbristylis lawiana
- Fimbristylis littoralis, lesser fimbristylis
- Fimbristylis merrillii
- Fimbristylis microcarya
- Fimbristylis nutans
- Fimbristylis polytrichoides
- Fimbristylis pubisquama
- Fimbristylis quinquangularis
- Fimbristylis salbundia
- Fimbristylis schoenoides, ditch fimbry
- Fimbristylis sieberiana
- Fimbristylis tetragona
- Fimbristylis turkestanica
- Fimbristylis variegata
- Fuirena ciliaris
- Fuirena coerulescens
- Fuirena cuspidata
- Fuirena ecklonii
- Fuirena obcordata
- Fuirena pubescens
- Fuirena trilobites
- Fuirena tuwensis
- Fuirena umbellata, yefen
- Fuirena uncinata
- Isolepis cernua, slender club-rush
- Isolepis digitata
- Isolepis fluitans, floating club-rush
- Isolepis natans
- Isolepis prolifera
- Isolepis pseudosetacea
- Isolepis setacea, bristle club-rush
- Kobresia simpliciuscula
- Kyllinga brevifolia
- Kyllinga bulbosa
- Kyllinga debilis
- Kyllinga melanosperma
- Kyllinga microstyla
- Kyllinga nemoralis, white water sedge
- Kyllinga tanzaniae
- Lipocarpha chinensis
- Lipocarpha filiformis
- Lipocarpha gracilis
- Lipocarpha kernii
- Lipocarpha maculata, American halfchaff sedge
- Lipocarpha micrantha, small-flowered dwarf-bulrush
- Mapania floribunda
- Mapania longiflora
- Mesomelaena pseudostygia, semaphore sedge
- Oreobolus cleefii
- Oreobolus kuekenthalii
- Pycreus bipartitus, shining flatsedge
- Pycreus cooperi
- Pycreus dwarkensis
- Pycreus elegantulus
- Pycreus flavescens
- Pycreus flavidus
- Pycreus intermedius
- Pycreus macranthus
- Pycreus macrostachyos
- Pycreus mortonii
- Pycreus nuerensis
- Pycreus oakfortensis
- Pycreus okavangensis
- Pycreus pauper
- Pycreus polystachyos, bunchy flat sedge
- Pycreus pumilus
- Pycreus puncticulatus
- Pycreus sanguinolentus
- Pycreus stramineus
- Pycreus xantholepis
- Queenslandiella hyalina, Queensland sedge
- Rhynchospora alba
- Rhynchospora armerioides
- Rhynchospora bakhuisensis
- Rhynchospora capillacea, needle beaksedge
- Rhynchospora capitellata, brownish beaksedge
- Rhynchospora corymbosa
- Rhynchospora fusca, brown beakrush
- Rhynchospora macrostachya
- Rhynchospora spectabilis
- Schoenoplectiella lateriflora
- Schoenoplectiella leucantha
- Schoenoplectiella purshiana
- Schoenoplectiella roylei
- Schoenoplectiella senegalensis
- Schoenoplectiella smithii
- Schoenoplectiella supina
- Schoenoplectus acutus, hardstem bulrush
- Schoenoplectus americanus, American bulrush
- Schoenoplectus corymbosus
- Schoenoplectus decipiens
- Schoenoplectus heterochaetus
- Schoenoplectus junceus
- Schoenoplectus lacustris, common club-rush
- Schoenoplectus litoralis
- Schoenoplectus mucronatus, bog bulrush
- Schoenoplectus muricinux
- Schoenoplectus muriculatus
- Schoenoplectus paludicola
- Schoenoplectus pulchellus
- Schoenoplectus subterminalis, water bulrush
- Schoenoplectus tabernaemontani, grey club-rush
- Schoenoplectus torreyi, Torrey's bulrush
- Schoenoplectus triqueter, triangular club-rush
- Schoenus deformis, tufted bog rush
- Schoenus nigricans, black bog-rush
- Scirpoides holoschoenus, round-headed club-rush
- Scirpus atrocinctus, black-girdled bulrush
- Scirpus atrovirens, wool bulrush
- Scirpus bicolor
- Scirpus cyperinus
- Scirpus expansus
- Scirpus georgianus
- Scirpus hattorianus
- Scirpus longii
- Scirpus microcarpus
- Scirpus pallidus
- Scirpus pedicellatus
- Scirpus pendulus
- Scirpus sylvaticus, wood club-rush
- Scleria amazonica
- Scleria biflora
- Scleria bracteata
- Scleria dregeana
- Scleria foliosa
- Scleria griegifolia
- Scleria iostephana
- Scleria mackaviensis
- Scleria mikawana
- Scleria reticularis, reticulated nutrush
- Scleria terrestris
- Scleria triglomerata, whip nutrush
- Scleria verticillata
- Scleria vogelii
- Trichophorum alpinum
- Trichophorum caespitosum
- Trichophorum clintonii
- Trichophorum subcapitatum
- Uncinia leptostachya, bastard grass
- Zameioscirpus atacamensis

==== Eriocaulaceae ====
Species

- Eriocaulon achiton
- Eriocaulon albocapitatum
- Eriocaulon apetalum
- Eriocaulon aquaticum
- Eriocaulon balakrishnanii
- Eriocaulon brevipedunculatum
- Eriocaulon breviscapum
- Eriocaulon brownianum
- Eriocaulon conicum
- Eriocaulon cookei
- Eriocaulon cuspidatum
- Eriocaulon dictyophyllum
- Eriocaulon dregei
- Eriocaulon duthiei
- Eriocaulon elenorae
- Eriocaulon eurypeplon
- Eriocaulon fluviatile
- Eriocaulon fysonii
- Eriocaulon heterolepis, buttonhead pipewort
- Eriocaulon hookerianum
- Eriocaulon hydrophilum
- Eriocaulon inyangense
- Eriocaulon kanarense
- Eriocaulon lanceolatum
- Eriocaulon leptophyllum
- Eriocaulon leucomelas
- Eriocaulon longicuspe
- Eriocaulon margaretae
- Eriocaulon minimum
- Eriocaulon minutum
- Eriocaulon nepalense
- Eriocaulon odoratum
- Eriocaulon oryzetorum
- Eriocaulon parviflorum
- Eriocaulon peninsulare
- Eriocaulon ritchieanum
- Eriocaulon robustobrownianum
- Eriocaulon robustum
- Eriocaulon sahyadricum
- Eriocaulon schimperi
- Eriocaulon schlechteri
- Eriocaulon schultzii
- Eriocaulon sedgwickii
- Eriocaulon stellulatum, starry pipewort
- Eriocaulon talbotii
- Eriocaulon thwaitesii
- Eriocaulon truncatum, short pipe-wort
- Eriocaulon wightianum
- Eriocaulon xeranthemum
- Paepalanthus celsus
- Paepalanthus ensifolius
- Paepalanthus stuebelianus
- Syngonanthus lanatus
- Syngonanthus peruvianus
- Tonina fluviatilis

Varieties

- Eriocaulon dregei var. sonderianum

==== Juncaceae ====
Species

- Distichia acicularis
- Juncus acuminatus
- Juncus acutus, spiny rush
- Juncus alpinoarticulatus
- Juncus anthelatus
- Juncus articulatus, jointed rush
- Juncus balticus
- Juncus biglumis
- Juncus bolanderi
- Juncus brachycephalus
- Juncus brevicaudatus
- Juncus bufonius, toad rush
- Juncus bulbosus, bulbous rush
- Juncus canadensis
- Juncus capensis
- Juncus compressus, round-fruited rush
- Juncus conglomeratus, compact rush
- Juncus decipiens
- Juncus dregeanus
- Juncus dudleyi
- Juncus effusus, soft rush
- Juncus exsertus
- Juncus filiformis
- Juncus fontanesii
- Juncus heldreichianus
- Juncus hybridus
- Juncus inflexus, hard rush
- Juncus lomatophyllus
- Juncus marginatus
- Juncus mertensianus
- Juncus militaris
- Juncus minutulus
- Juncus nodosus
- Juncus oxycarpus
- Juncus pelocarpus
- Juncus prismatocarpus
- Juncus punctorius
- Juncus requienii
- Juncus rigidus, sea rush
- Juncus scabriusculus
- Juncus socotranus
- Juncus striatus
- Juncus stygius
- Juncus subcaudatus
- Juncus subnodulosus, blunt-flowered rush
- Juncus subtilis
- Juncus subulatus
- Juncus supiniformis
- Juncus tenageia
- Juncus triglumis
- Juncus wallichianus
- Luzula abyssinica
- Luzula wahlenbergii
- Prionium serratum

Subspecies

- Juncus dregeanus subsp. bachitii
- Juncus dregeanus subsp. dregeanus

==== Poaceae ====
Species

- Acroceras zizanioides, oat grass
- Aegopogon cenchroides
- Agropyron michnoi, Michno's wheatgrass
- Agrostis aequivalvis
- Agrostis canina, velvet bent
- Agrostis clavata
- Agrostis dyeri
- Agrostis lachnantha
- Agrostis media
- Agrostis nervosa
- Agrostis olympica
- Agrostis perennans
- Agrostis petriei
- Agrostis stolonifera, creeping bent grass
- Agrostis subulifolia
- Alopecurus aequalis, orange foxtail
- Alopecurus arundinaceus, creeping foxtail
- Alopecurus carolinianus, tufted foxtail
- Alopecurus creticus
- Alopecurus himalaicus
- Alopecurus magellanicus
- Alopecurus setarioides
- Ammochloa palaestina
- Andropogon chevalieri, beardgrass
- Andropogon virginicus, broomsedge bluestem
- Antinoria agrostidea
- Arctophila fulva
- Aristida appressa
- Aristida blakei
- Aristida purpurea, democrat grass
- Aristida repens
- Aristida subspicata, Galapagos three-awn grass
- Arundinella leptochloa
- Arundinella thwaitesii
- Arundo donax, giant reed
- Avena canariensis
- Axonopus scoparius, imperial carpet grass
- Axonopus senescens
- Bambusa heterostachya
- Beckmannia eruciformis
- Beckmannia syzigachne
- Bothriochloa pseudischaemum
- Brachiaria eruciformis
- Brachiaria longiflora
- Brachiaria multiculma
- Brachiaria mutica
- Brachiaria praetervisa, large armgrass
- Brachiaria ramosa
- Brachiaria reptans, creeping panic grass
- Brachiaria scalaris
- Brachiaria subquadripara
- Brachiaria texana, Texas signal grass
- Brachypodium retusum
- Bromus fasciculatus
- Bromus suksdorfii, Suksdorf's brome
- Calamagrostis canadensis, bluejoint reed grass
- Calamagrostis chalybaea
- Calamagrostis coarctata, Arctic reedgrass
- Calamagrostis ecuadoriensis
- Calamagrostis fibrovaginata
- Calamagrostis inexpansa, northern reedgrass
- Calamagrostis lapponica, Lapland reedgrass
- Calamagrostis pseudophragmites
- Calamagrostis setiflora
- Catabrosa aquatica, whorl-grass
- Cenchrus platyacanthus
- Chionachne gigantea
- Chionachne punctata
- Chionochloa rigida, narrow leaved snow tussock
- Chondrosum elatum
- Chondrosum gracile
- Chrysopogon polyphyllus
- Chusquea bambusoides, Brazil scrambling bamboo
- Chusquea circinata
- Chusquea perligulata
- Chusquea sulcata
- Coelachne minuta
- Coelachne perpusilla
- Coelorachis aurita
- Coleanthus subtilis
- Colpodium tibeticum
- Cottea pappophoroides, cotta grass
- Crypsis alopecuroides
- Crypsis schoenoides, swamp pricklegrass
- Cymbopogon obtectus, silky heads
- Cynodon transvaalensis, African Bermuda grass
- Dendrocalamus giganteus
- Dendrocalamus membranaceus
- Desmostachya bipinnata
- Digitaria balansae
- Digitaria curtigluma
- Digitaria curvinervis
- Digitaria junghuhniana
- Digitaria phaeotricha
- Digitaria siderograpta, crab grass
- Digitaria stenostachya
- Dimeria ornithopoda
- Dinebra haareri
- Distichlis spicata
- Echinochloa colona
- Echinochloa crus-galli
- Echinochloa frumentacea
- Echinochloa picta
- Echinochloa pyramidalis, antelope grass
- Echinochloa walteri
- Ehrharta stipoides, meadow ricegrass
- Eleusine indica
- Elionurus platypus
- Elymus alopex
- Elymus strictus
- Elymus violaceus
- Elytrophorus spicatus, spike grass
- Eragrostis aethiopica
- Eragrostis astreptoclada
- Eragrostis coarctata
- Eragrostis concinna
- Eragrostis condensata
- Eragrostis hondurensis
- Eragrostis hypnoides
- Eragrostis japonica, pond lovegrass
- Eragrostis orthoclada
- Eragrostis pubescens
- Eragrostis pusilla
- Eragrostis scabriflora
- Eragrostis sericata
- Eragrostis silveana, Silveus' lovegrass
- Eragrostis subsecunda
- Eragrostis unioloides
- Eremocaulon amazonicum
- Eriochloa meyeriana
- Eriochloa procera, spring grass
- Eulalia contorta
- Fargesia grossa
- Festuca chimborazensis
- Festuca christianii-bernardii
- Festuca elmeri, coast fescue
- Festuca henriquesii
- Festuca olgae
- Festuca parvigluma
- Festuca pubiglumis
- Festuca sodiroana
- Festuca summilusitana
- Festuca tatrae
- Festuca vaginalis
- Festuca varia
- Garnotia courtallensis
- Glyceria arundinacea
- Glyceria borealis
- Glyceria canadensis
- Glyceria fluitans, floating sweet-grass
- Glyceria grandis
- Glyceria leptostachya
- Glyceria maxima
- Glyceria melicaria
- Glyceria nemoralis
- Glyceria notata, plicate sweet-grass
- Glyceria obtusa
- Glyceria pulchella
- Glyceria septentrionalis, eastern mannagrass
- Glyceria striata
- Guadua weberbaueri
- Helictotrichon canescens
- Hemarthria altissima
- Hemarthria compressa, whip grass
- Homolepis aturensis
- Hyperthelia edulis
- Ichnanthus mayarensis
- Isachne albens
- Isachne angolensis
- Isachne clarkei
- Isachne disperma
- Isachne elegans
- Isachne globosa, swamp millet
- Isachne pulchella
- Isachne villosa
- Ischaemum molle
- Ischaemum muticum
- Ischaemum travancorense
- Iseilema macratherum, bull Flinders grass
- Koeleria micrathera
- Koeleria novozelandica
- Lasiacis divaricata, smallcane
- Leersia friesii
- Leersia oryzoides, cut-grass
- Leersia virginica
- Leptochloa fusca
- Leptochloa neesii, umbrella canegrass
- Leptochloa obtusiflora
- Leptochloa panicea, mucronate sprangletop
- Mesosetum ferrugineum
- Micraira spiciforma
- Muhlenbergia arenicola
- Muhlenbergia distichophylla
- Muhlenbergia duthieana
- Muhlenbergia glomerata
- Muhlenbergia spiciformis, longawn muhly
- Muhlenbergia uniflora
- Muhlenbergia watsoniana
- Nassella ibarrensis
- Nassella nardoides
- Neurachne minor
- Nicoraepoa subenervis
- Odontelytrum abyssinicum
- Olyra standleyi
- Oryza officinalis
- Oryza rufipogon
- Oryzidium barnardii
- Panicum acuminatum
- Panicum comorense
- Panicum effusum, hairy panic grass
- Panicum gilvum
- Panicum hippothrix
- Panicum lukwangulense
- Panicum millegrana
- Panicum mlahiense
- Panicum pilgerianum
- Panicum pole-evansii
- Panicum pseudowoeltzkowii
- Panicum repens
- Panicum rigidum
- Panicum scabriusculum
- Panicum strigosum, roughhair witchgrass
- Panicum sumatrense, barefoot panicgrass
- Paratheria glaberrima
- Paspalidium flavidum
- Paspalidium geminatum
- Paspalidium punctatum
- Paspalum canarae
- Paspalum clavuliferum
- Paspalum conjugatum
- Paspalum densum
- Paspalum distichum, knotgrass
- Paspalum distortum
- Paspalum galapageium
- Paspalum longifolium
- Paspalum maculosum
- Paspalum pleostachyum
- Paspalum repens
- Paspalum riparium
- Paspalum scrobiculatum, Kodo millet
- Paspalum squamulatum
- Paspalum vaginatum, seashore paspalum
- Pennisetum frutescens, naked fountain grass
- Pennisetum macrourum
- Pennisetum natalense
- Pennisetum thunbergii
- Pentameris aristidoides
- Pentameris capensis
- Pentameris tomentella
- Phalaris arundinacea, reed canary-grass
- Phalaris truncata
- Pharus latifolius
- Phippsia algida, ice grass
- Phleum alpinum
- Phleum montanum
- Phragmites australis, common reed
- Phragmites karka
- Phragmites vallatorius
- Phyllorachis sagittata
- Pleioblastus fortunei
- Pleuropogon refractus
- Pleuropogon sabinei
- Poa acicularifolia, limestone cushion poa
- Poa angustifolia
- Poa annua, annual meadow grass
- Poa bolanderi, Bolander's bluegrass
- Poa dimorphantha
- Poa faberi
- Poa hartzii
- Poa hirtiglumis
- Poa homomalla
- Poa hothamensis, ledge grass
- Poa lanigera
- Poa leioclada
- Poa leptocoma
- Poa palustris
- Poa paramoensis
- Poa pilata
- Poa pratensis, smooth meadow grass
- Poa reflexa
- Poa schimperiana
- Poa szechuensis
- Poecilostachys oplismenoides
- Pogonatherum paniceum
- Polypogon monspeliensis, annual beard-grass
- Polypogon nilgiricus
- Polypogon viridis, water bent
- Polytrias indica, Batiki bluegrass
- Psathyrostachys juncea
- Pseudoraphis sordida
- Pseudosorghum zollingeri
- Puccinellia angustata
- Puccinellia arctica, Arctic alkali grass
- Puccinellia nuttalliana
- Puccinellia pusilla
- Reynaudia filiformis
- Rytidosperma richardsonii, straw wallaby-grass
- Saccharum kajkaiense
- Saccharum ravennae
- Saccharum spontaneum
- Sacciolepis angustissima
- Sacciolepis curvata
- Sacciolepis cymbiandra
- Sacciolepis myosuroides
- Sasa cernua
- Sasa hidaensis
- Schizachyrium brevifolium, serillo dulce
- Schizachyrium gresicola
- Schizachyrium yangambiense
- Schizostachyum glaucifolium
- Sclerochloa woronowii
- Scolochloa festucacea
- Sesleria coerulans
- Setaria cernua
- Setaria parviflora, marsh brittlegrass
- Setaria paspalidioides
- Setaria setosa, West Indian bristle grass
- Sorghum angustum
- Sorghum interjectum
- Sorghum purpureosericeum
- Sorghum stipoideum
- Sorghum virgatum
- Spartina alterniflora, Atlantic cordgrass
- Spartina gracilis
- Spartina pectinata
- Sporobolus coahuilensis
- Sporobolus consimilis
- Sporobolus discosporus
- Sporobolus geminatus
- Sporobolus stapfianus
- Sporobolus tourneuxii
- Sporobolus trichodes
- Stipa austroitalica
- Stipa dongicola
- Stipa himalaica
- Stipa kingii, King's ricegrass
- Stipa lessingiana
- Stipa milleana
- Stipa oligostachya
- Stipa scribneri, Scribner needlegrass
- Thrasya thrasyoides
- Torreyochloa pallida
- Tragus pedunculatus
- Trichoneura lindleyana
- Trichopteryx dregeana
- Triodia lanata, wooly spinifex
- Triodia secunda, porcupine spinifex
- Trisetum bifidum
- Urochloa panicoides
- Ventenata dubia, North African grass
- Vetiveria fulvibarbis
- Vulpia octoflora, festuca octoflora
- Vulpiella stipoides
- Zingeria biebersteiniana
- Zingeria pisidica
- Zizania aquatica
- Zizania palustris

Varieties

- Paspalum galapageium var. galapageium
- Paspalum galapageium var. minoratum

==== Restionaceae ====
- Centrolepis glabra, smooth centrolepis
- Centrolepis philippinensis
- Elegia macrocarpa
- Platycaulos mahonii
- Restio insignis
- Restio subverticillatus

==== Typhaceae ====
- Sparganium americanum
- Sparganium androcladum
- Sparganium angustifolium, floating bur-reed
- Sparganium emersum, unbranched bur-reed
- Sparganium erectum, branched bur-reed
- Sparganium eurycarpum
- Sparganium fallax
- Sparganium fluctuans
- Sparganium glomeratum
- Sparganium hyperboreum
- Sparganium natans, least bur-reed
- Sparganium subglobosum, floating burr-reed
- Typha angustifolia, lesser bulrush
- Typha capensis
- Typha domingensis, southern cat-tail
- Typha elephantina
- Typha latifolia, broadleaf cattail
- Typha laxmannii
- Typha minima, dwarf bulrush
- Typha orientalis, bullrush

==== Xyridaceae ====
- Xyris aquatica
- Xyris bracteata
- Xyris capensis
- Xyris complanata
- Xyris difformis
- Xyris elliottii, Elliot's yelloweyed grass
- Xyris gracilis
- Xyris inaequalis
- Xyris indica
- Xyris intersita
- Xyris lobbii
- Xyris montana
- Xyris natalensis
- Xyris pauciflora
- Xyris peteri, yelloweyed grass
- Xyris wallichii

=== Hydatellales ===
- Trithuria lanterna

=== Zingiberales ===
There are 67 species and two varieties in the order Zingiberales assessed as least concern.

==== Costaceae ====
- Cheilocostus speciosus, synonym of Hellenia speciosa
- Costus bracteatus
- Costus curvibracteatus
- Costus giganteus
- Costus lasius
- Costus lima
- Costus malortieanus
- Costus plicatus
- Costus ricus
- Costus stenophyllus
- Costus villosissimus
- Costus wilsonii
- Costus woodsonii

==== Zingiberaceae ====
Species

- Aframomum angustifolium, Guinea grains
- Aframomum sulcatum
- Alpinia conchigera
- Amomum chinense
- Amomum chryseum
- Amomum elephantorum
- Amomum glabrifolium
- Amomum koenigii
- Amomum longiligulare
- Amomum masticatorium
- Amomum microcarpum
- Amomum pierreanum
- Amomum plicatum
- Amomum prionocarpum
- Amomum pterocarpum
- Amomum repoeense
- Amomum rubidum
- Amomum schmidtii
- Amomum sp.
- Amomum subcapitatum
- Amomum tenellum
- Amomum tomrey
- Amomum uliginosum
- Amomum villosum
- Aulotandra trigonocarpa
- Boesenbergia belalongensis
- Boesenbergia rotunda, Chinese ginger
- Boesenbergia xiphostachya
- Caulokaempferia violacea
- Curcuma aeruginosa
- Curcuma ecomata
- Curcuma harmandii
- Curcuma inodora, hidden lily
- Curcuma roscoeana, jewel of Burma
- Globba adhaerens
- Globba albiflora
- Globba fragilis
- Globba geoffrayi
- Globba pendula
- Globba racemosa
- Globba reflexa
- Globba sessiliflora
- Globba siamensis
- Globba substrigosa
- Globba winitii
- Globba xantholeuca
- Hedychium elatum
- Renealmia aurantifera
- Zingiber cernuum
- Zingiber junceum
- Zingiber neotruncatum
- Zingiber pellitum
- Zingiber thorelii

Varieties

- Amomum tomrey var. tomrey
- Amomum villosum var. villosum

==== Other Zingiberales species ====
- Ensete glaucum
- Ensete livingstonianum, wild banana
- Heliconia farinosa
- Monotagma dolosum
- Musa ingens
- Musa sikkimensis
- Stachyphrynium spicatum

== See also ==
- Lists of IUCN Red List least concern species
- List of near threatened plants
- List of vulnerable plants
- List of endangered plants
- List of critically endangered plants
- List of recently extinct plants
- List of data deficient plants
