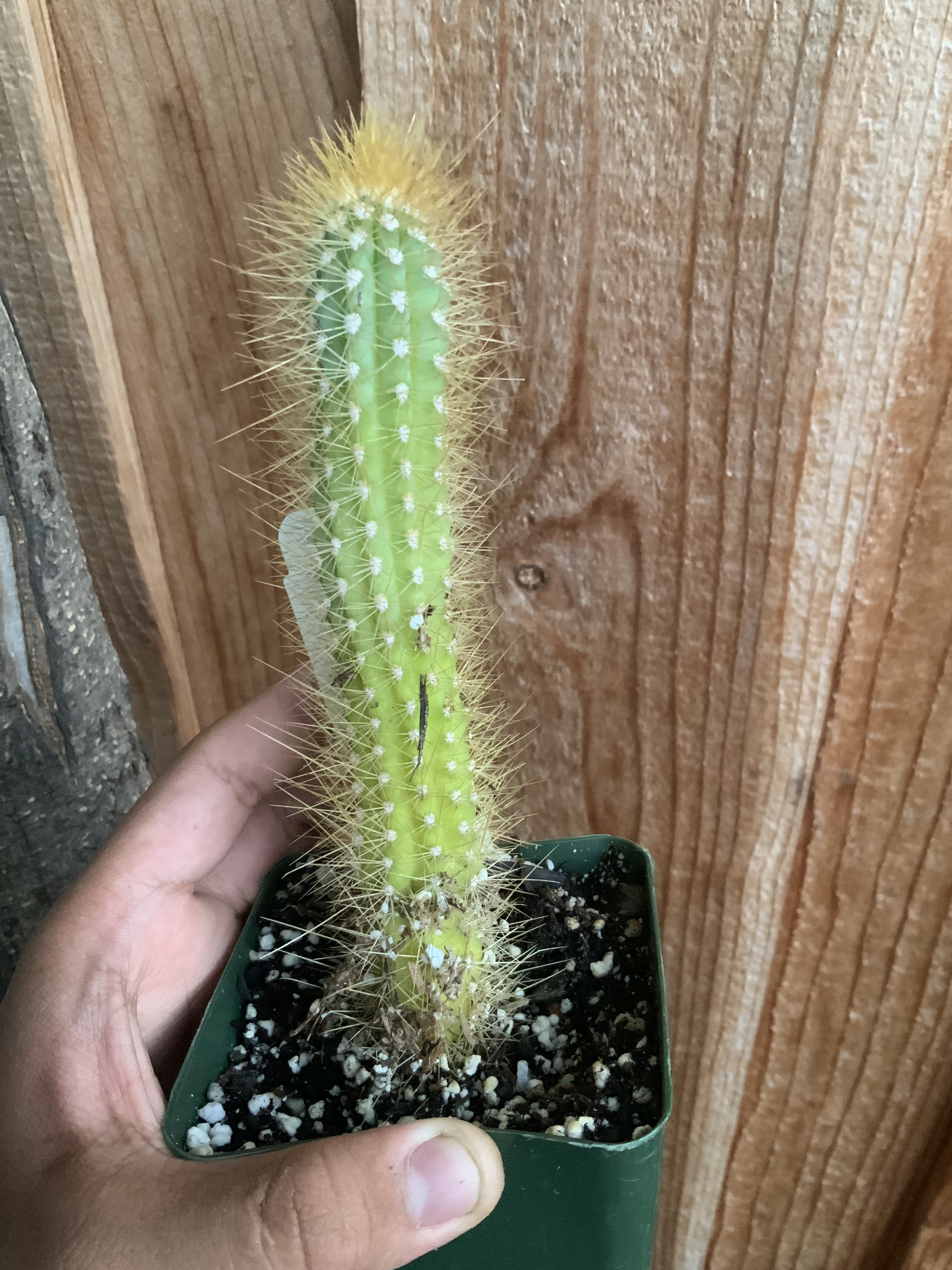

Scientific classification
- Kingdom: Plantae
- Clade: Tracheophytes
- Clade: Angiosperms
- Clade: Eudicots
- Order: Caryophyllales
- Family: Cactaceae
- Subfamily: Cactoideae
- Genus: Pilosocereus
- Species: P. pusillibaccatus

Binomial name
- Pilosocereus pusillibaccatus P.J. Braun & Esteves

= Pilosocereus pusillibaccatus =

Species of cactus

Pilosocereus pusillibaccatus is a species of plant in the family Cactaceae. It is endemic to Brazil.

== Description ==
Pilosocereus pusillibaccatus is a species of low-growing, cluster cactus with yellow spines, a green stem and small fruits

== Taxonomy ==
Pilosocereus pusillibaccatus was described in 1986, by Pierre Josef Braun and Eddie Esteves. P. pusillibaccatus is often confused with Pilosocereus Machrisii, and is in the Pilosocere aurisetus group along with Pilosocereus vilaboensis, Pilosocereus aurisetus, Pilosocereus jauruensis, Pilosocereus parvus, and Pilosocereus machrisii. The name "Pusillibaccatus" refers to the small fruit this species produces.
