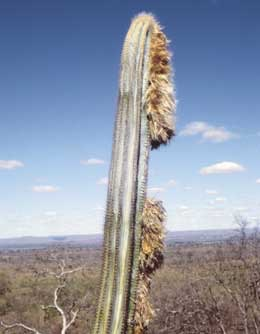

Scientific classification
- Kingdom: Plantae
- Clade: Embryophytes
- Clade: Tracheophytes
- Clade: Spermatophytes
- Clade: Angiosperms
- Clade: Eudicots
- Order: Caryophyllales
- Family: Cactaceae
- Subfamily: Cactoideae
- Tribe: Cereeae
- Subtribe: Cereinae
- Genus: Pilosocereus
- Species: P. occultiflorus

Binomial name
- Pilosocereus occultiflorus P.J.Braun & Esteves

= Pilosocereus occultiflorus =

Species of cactus

Pilosocereus occultiflorus is a species of cactus native to Brazil.

== Description ==
Pilosocereus occultiflorus is a tree-like cactus with a woody trunk up to 23 cm in diameter. Often branching meters above the ground, P. occultiflorus is candelabra-shaped and reaches heights of up to 7 meters. The slightly curved stems are dull gray-green, growing up to 3 meters long and 6 to 9.5 centimeters in diameter. On each stem, there are 8 to 9 triangular ribs in cross-section. The areoles on these ribs are spaced 5 to 9 millimeters apart. The spines are yellow, becoming gray with age. The areoles have 6 to 13 central spines (25 to 90 mm) and 20 radial spines (9 to 11 mm). A pronounced cephalium is present on mature stems. The floriferous areoles are covered with brown wool. The flowers are 3 to 4 cm long and reach diameters of 2 to 2.5 cm at anthesis. The fruits are 1.9 to 2.4 cm, splitting open when ripe.

== Taxonomy ==
Pilosocereus occultiflorus was first described by Pierre Josef Braun and Eddie Esteves Pereira in 1999. It is possibly a natural hybrid between Pilosocereus densiareolatus and Pilosocereus pachycladus subsp. pachycladus.

== Etymology ==
The specific epithet "occultiflorus" refers to the flowers hidden in the pseudocephalium. This epithet comes from the Latin "occultus" meaning covered or hidden and the Latin "-florus" meaning flowered.
