= Pilosocereus samanensis =

Scientific classification
- Kingdom: Plantae
- Clade: Tracheophytes
- Clade: Angiosperms
- Clade: Eudicots
- Order: Caryophyllales
- Family: Cactaceae
- Subfamily: Cactoideae
- Genus: Pilosocereus
- Species: P. samanensis

Binomial name
- Pilosocereus samanensis Hoxey & Gdaniec

Species of cactus

Pilosocereus samanensis is a species of flowering plant in the cactus family Cactaceae, endemic to the northeast of the Dominican Republic. It was first described in 2021. P. samanensis has also been considered to fall within the normal variability of P. polygonus, and so not a distinct species.

== Description ==
Plants of Pilosocereus samanensis have a tree-like habit, 2–3 m (7–10 ft) tall, with a woody trunk up to 50 cm (1.6 ft) tall and 15–20 cm (6–8 in) across. The primary stem supports 5–10 upright branches, occasionally up to 20, some becoming woody as they age. The stems are 5–6 cm (2–2 in) across and have 8–9 ribs. They are green when young becoming grey-green with age. The areoles are about 3 mm (0.1 in) across and about 8 mm (0.3 in) apart. Non-flowering areoles initially have a few white hairs up to 10 mm (0.4 in) long which are lost with age. Flowering areoles have many more white hairs. Areoles bear about 12–15 spines, mostly 15–20 mm (0.6–0.8 in) long.

The flowers appear at night. Excluding the style, they are about 55–65 mm (2.2–2.6 in) long. The white style is up to 40 mm (1.6 in) long. The outer perianth segments are rounded and fleshy, about 10 mm (0.4 in) long and wide. The inner perianth segments are white. The fruit is spherical, about 30 mm (1.2 in) across, with red pulp and shiny black seeds.

== Taxonomy ==
Pilosocereus samanensis was first described in 2021. The specific epithet samanensis refers to the Samaná peninsula where this species appears to be restricted. Previously, all the species of Pilosocereus found on the island of Hispaniola were treated as Pilosocereus polygonus. P. samanensis was distinguished from P. polygonus by its shorter height when mature. Its stems are generally thinner (up to 6 cm (2.4 in) across). Its spines are shorter (generally about 15 mm (0.6 in) long rather than 15–30 mm (0.6–1.2 in) long). Its areoles also have distinctly shorter tufts of hairs than P. polygonus. It has a mixture of features found in P. polygonus and P. excelsus. P. samanensis has also been considered to fall within the normal variability of P. polygonus, and so not a distinct species.

== Distribution and habitat ==
Pilosocereus samanensis is endemic to the northeast of the Dominican Republic, where it has only been found on the Samaná peninsula. Most of the peninsula has a high rainfall so that the habitat is generally unsuitable for cacti. P. samanensis occurs only on steep rocky cliffs on the coast, along with other xerophytic plants such as Agave and Opuntia.
