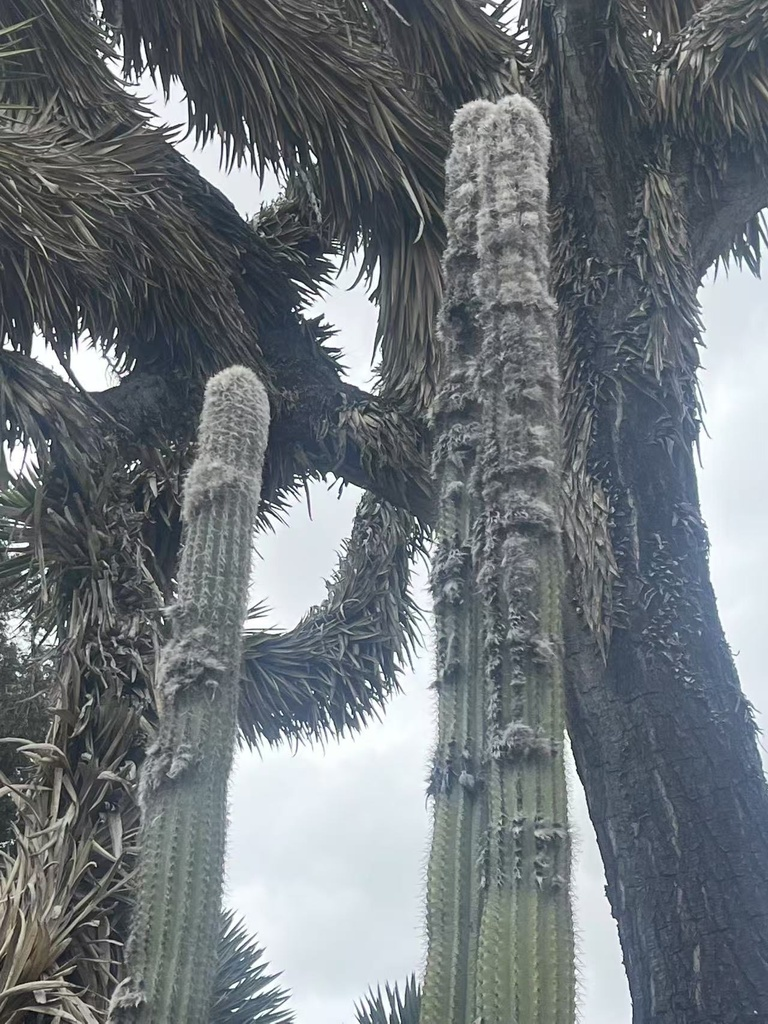

Scientific classification
- Kingdom: Plantae
- Clade: Tracheophytes
- Clade: Angiosperms
- Clade: Eudicots
- Order: Caryophyllales
- Family: Cactaceae
- Subfamily: Cactoideae
- Genus: Pilosocereus
- Species: P. alensis

Binomial name
- Pilosocereus alensis (F.A.C.Weber ex Rol.-Goss.) Byles & G.D.Rowley

Synonyms
- Cephalocereus alensis (F.A.C.Weber) Britton & Rose; Cephalocereus guerreronis (Backeb.) Buxb.; Cereus alensis (Weber) Vaupel; Pilocereus alensis F.A.C.Weber ex Rol.-Goss.; Pilocereus guerreronis Backeb.; Pilosocereus guerreronis (Backeb.) Byles & G.D.Rowley

= Pilosocereus alensis =

Species of cactus

Pilosocereus alensis, the Sonoran old man cactus, is a species of cactus native to Western Mexico, from Sonora south to Jalisco. The hairs protect the flower buds. Flowers open at night in June and give off the odor of ammonia, attracting bats for pollination.
