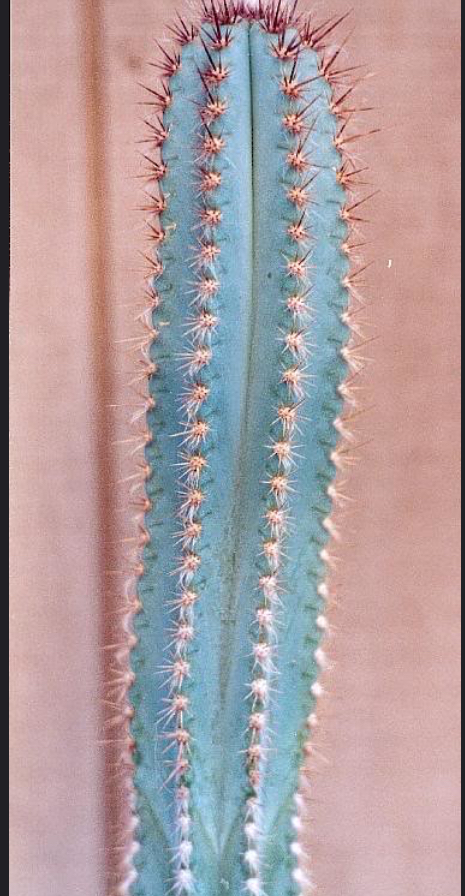

Scientific classification
- Kingdom: Plantae
- Clade: Tracheophytes
- Clade: Angiosperms
- Clade: Eudicots
- Order: Caryophyllales
- Family: Cactaceae
- Subfamily: Cactoideae
- Genus: Pilosocereus
- Species: P. rosae

Binomial name
- Pilosocereus rosae P.J.Braun.

Synonyms
- Pilosocereus fulvilanatus subsp. rosae (P.J.Braun) Zappi

= Pilosocereus rosae =

Species of plant

Pilosocereus rosae is a species of tree cactus found in Minas Gerais, Brazil.

== Description ==
It is a moderately branched plant growing to a few meters tall, often found on rocky outcrops. The stem consists of 5-7 thin ribs 2-3.5 centimeters (1-2 inches) wide. Areoles are round or oval, 3-4 millimeters wide, 3-4 millimeters wide, and have brownish hairs on mature stems. The cephalium is very thin consisting of 3-4 centimeter long hair of golden brownish orange. Spines are up to 5 centimeters long, with radial spines between 1-2 centimeters. All spines are dark at the base and become greyish as they age. The fruits are 2-5cm, globose, and will reveal there red flesh when they ripen.

== Taxonomy ==
The taxonomy of the species and other Pilosocereus has only been cleared recently. This species was formerly known as Pilosocereus fulvilanatus subsp. rosae.

== Pollination and dispersal ==
Like other Pilosocereus, Pilosocereus rosae is likely pollinated by bats or insects as the flowers have a strong, rotten smell. Fruits are dispersed by frugivores such as bats.
