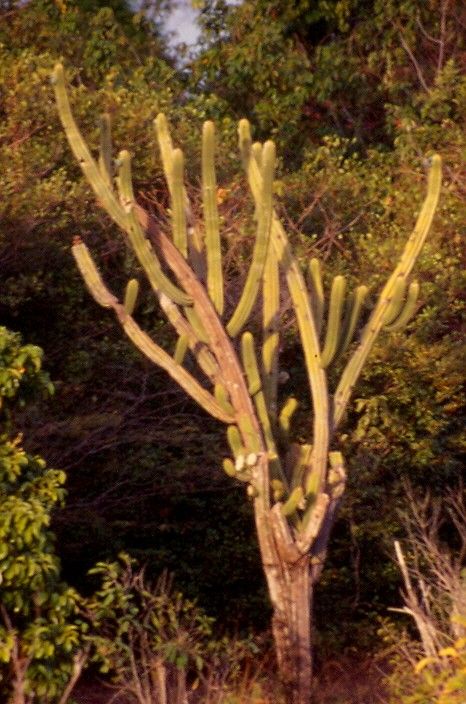
- Pilosocereus catingicola

Scientific classification
- Kingdom: Plantae
- Clade: Tracheophytes
- Clade: Angiosperms
- Clade: Eudicots
- Order: Caryophyllales
- Family: Cactaceae
- Subfamily: Cactoideae
- Tribe: Cereeae
- Subtribe: Cereinae
- Genus: Pilosocereus; Byles & G.D.Rowley

Type species
- Pilosocereus leucocephalus (Poselg.) Byles & G.D.Rowley

Species
- See text
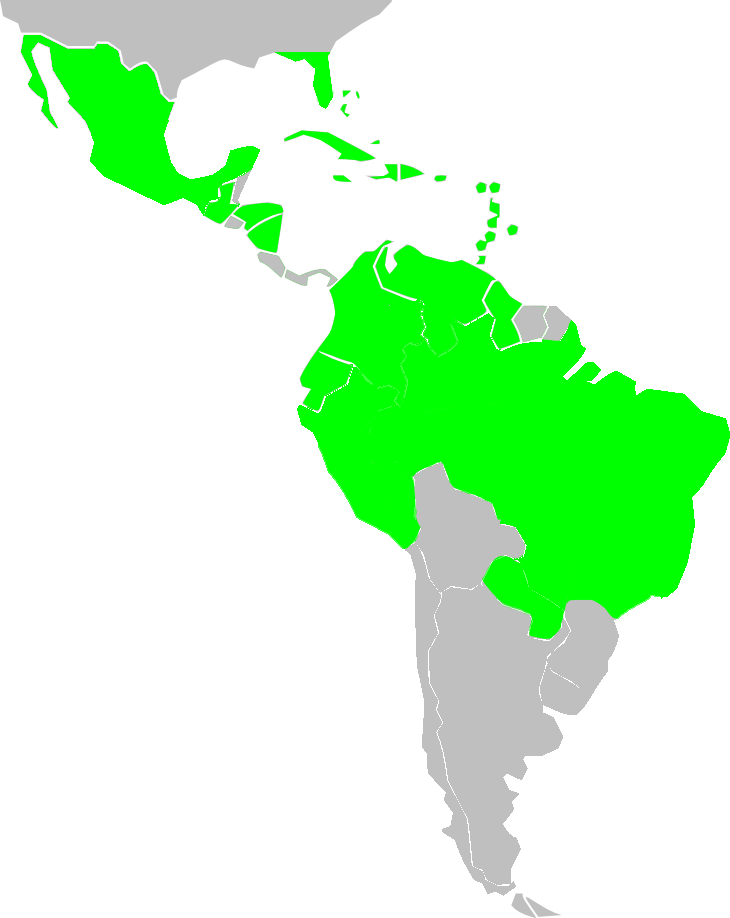
- Approximate distribution

Synonyms
- Pilocereus sensu K.Schum. non Lem.; Pseudopilocereus Buxb.

= Pilosocereus =

Genus of cacti

Pilosocereus (from Latin, "hairy cereus") is a genus of cactus native to the Neotropics. Tree cactus is a common name for Pilosocereus species. The genus Pseudopilocereus is a synonym of this genus. For many years, the illegitimate name Pilocereus was used for this genus, although properly a synonym for Cephalocereus. The subdivision of the genus has varied very widely, resulting in very different numbers of species being accepted.

The commonly cultivated Pilosocereus pachycladus (syn. Pilosocereus azureus) is a blue cactus with hairy areoles that emit golden spines.

== Description ==
Species of the genus Pilosocereus are columnar cacti with a shrubby or tree-like habit. Some may be up to 7 m (23 ft) tall. They may be unbranched, or have a dense mass of branches. The stems vary widely in the number of ribs and spines. The areoles may have long or short hairs, sometimes with more silky hairs on flowering areoles than on non-flowering ones. A few species have a pseudocephalium. The flowers usually open at night and may smell strongly of garlic. The fruits have white, red-purple or other-colored pulp when ripe.

== Taxonomy ==
The taxonomic history of the genus name Pilosocereus is somewhat complicated. In 1838, Charles Antoine Lemaire created a section within the genus Cereus, C. sect. Cephalophori, based on Cereus senilis and C. columna-trajani. In the same year, Ludwig Pfeiffer published the genus name Cephalocereus, also based on Cereus senilis. In 1839, Lemaire raised his Cereus sect. Cephalophori to a genus under the name Pilocereus, presumably unaware of Pfeiffer's earlier name. Since both Cephalocereus and Pilocereus are based on the same type (i.e. Cereus senilis), the later of the two names is superfluous, and so must be rejected under the International Code of Nomenclature for algae, fungi, and plants (ICNafp). In 1894, Karl Moritz Schumann decided that Lemaire's Cereus sect. Cephalophori needed to be split into two genera, rather than treated as one genus. He retained Pfeiffer's Cephalocereus, and attempted to use Pilocereus for the other. Schumann removed from Pilocereus both of the species originally designated by Lemaire; however, this is not allowed by the ICNafp which requires that a name is permanently attached to its type, so Pilocereus sensu Schumann is equally illegitimate.

Subsequently, the genus name Pilocereus was widely used and several attempts were made to legitimize it. One possible solution would have been to conserve Schumann's name against Lemaire's. However, a proposal to do so was not accepted by the 1954 International Botanical Congress. In 1957, Ronald Stewart Byles and Gordon Rowley provided a solution by publishing Pilosocereus with the type species Pilocereus leucocephalus (which thus became Pilosocereus leucocephalus). They also provided names in Pilosocereus for all the species then placed in Pilocereus.

The number of species recognized within the genus has varied very considerably. Taking the Caribbean and northern Andes as an example, Britton and Rose accepted 18 species in their 1920 treatment (which used the genus Cephalocereus). Many later authors followed this approach when Cephalocereus was split and the relevant species placed in what is now Pilosocereus. Alternatively, treatments in the late 1990s and early 2000s used much more broadly circumscribed species, resulting in many fewer being recognized, for example as few as two or three replaced the 18 of Britton and Rose. A 2019 review of Pilosocereus in the Caribbean and northern Andes returned to a larger number of species with narrower circumscriptions. A 2020 molecular phylogenetic study of the genus resulted in three species being moved to a new genus Xiquexique to maintain the monophyly of Pilosocereus, which the authors considered to have 42 species placed in two subgenera, Pilosocereus subg. Pilosocereus and Pilosocereus subg. Gounellea. As of July 2025, Plants of the World Online accepted 61 species, including two natural hybridS.

== Natural hybrids ==
=== × Colosocereus ===
A natural hybrid between Pilosocereus magnificus and Coleocephalocereus decumbens occurs in Brazil.

=== × Microsocereus ===
At least two known natural hybrids exists between Pilosocereus and Micranthocereus. Pilosocereus pentaedrophorus and Pilosocereus glauchorus are known to hybridize with Micranthocereus purpureus.

== Species ==
As of January 2025, Plants of the World Online accepted the following species: (Pilosocereus novaromanus was described in 2025, and as of January 2026 was not yet accepted by Plants of the World Online.)

Image	Scientific name	Distribution
	Pilosocereus albisummus P.J.Braun & Esteves	Minas Gerais, Brazil
	Pilosocereus alensis (F.A.C.Weber ex Rol.-Goss.) Byles & G.D.Rowley	Western Mexico
	Pilosocereus armatus (Otto ex Pfeiff.) A.R.Franck	Puerto Rico and the Virgin Islands
	Pilosocereus arrabidae (Steud.) Byles & G.D.Rowley	Brazil
	Pilosocereus aureispinus (Buining & Brederoo) F.Ritter	Brazil
	Pilosocereus aurisetus (Werderm.) Byles & G.D.Rowley	Minas Gerais, Brazil
	Pilosocereus azulensis N.P.Taylor & Zappi	Minas Gerais, Brazil
	Pilosocereus brasiliensis (Britton & Rose) Backeb.	East Brazil
	Pilosocereus brauniorum (Esteves) N.P.Taylor & Zappi	Minas Gerais, Brazil
	Pilosocereus brevispinus Hoxey & Gdaniec	Central Hispaniola
	Pilosocereus brooksianus (Britton & Rose) Byles & G.D.Rowley	Southeast Cuba
	Pilosocereus catimbauensis (N.P.Taylor & Albuq.-Lima) N.P.Taylor & Albuq.-Lima	Pernambuco, Brazil
	Pilosocereus catingicola (Gürke) Byles & G.D.Rowley	Rio Grande do Norte, Pernambuco, Alagoas, Sergipe, Paraíba, Bahia.
	Pilosocereus chrysacanthus (F.A.C.Weber ex K.Schum.) Byles & G.D.Rowley	Mexico and Honduras
	Pilosocereus chrysostele (Vaupel) Byles & G.D.Rowley	Brazil
	Pilosocereus collinsii (Britton & Rose) Byles & G.D.Rowley	Oaxaca, Mexico
	Pilosocereus colombianus (Rose) Byles & G.D.Rowley	Colombia, Ecuador
	Pilosocereus curtisii (Otto) A.R.Franck	The Lesser Antilles and the British Virgin Islands
	Pilosocereus densiareolatus F.Ritter	East Brazil
	Pilosocereus diersianus (Esteves) P.J.Braun	Tocantins and Goiás
	Pilosocereus eddie-estevesii (P.J.Braun) Guiggi	Minas Gerais
	Pilosocereus estevesii P.J. Braun	Bahia
	Pilosocereus excelsus Hoxey & Gdaniec	East Dominican Republic
	Pilosocereus flavipulvinatus (Buining & Brederoo) F.Ritter	Northern Brazil
	Pilosocereus flexibilispinus P.J.Braun & Esteves	Central Brazil
	Pilosocereus floccosus Byles & G.D.Rowley	East Brazil
	Pilosocereus fulvilanatus (Buining & Brederoo) F.Ritter	Minas Gerais, Brazil
	Pilosocereus gaumeri (Britton & Rose) Backeb.	Southeast Mexico
	Pilosocereus glaucochrous (Werderm.) Byles & G.D.Rowley	Northeast Brazil
	Pilosocereus goianus P.J.Braun & Esteves	Goiás
	Pilosocereus hermii P.J.Braun, Esteves & Hofacker	Brazil
	Pilosocereus jamaicensis Proctor	Cayman Islands, Jamaica
	Pilosocereus juaruensis (Buining & Brederoo) P.J.Braun	Central Brazil, Northeast Paraguay
	Pilosocereus kanukuensis (Alexander) Leuenb.	Kanuku mountains, Guyana
	Pilosocereus lanuginosus (L.) Byles & G.D.Rowley	Netherlands Antilles
	Pilosocereus leucocephalus (Poselg.) Byles & G.D.Rowley	Mexico, Honduras
	Pilosocereus lindaianus P.J.Braun & Esteves	Brazil
	Pilosocereus machrisii (E.Y.Dawson) Backeb.	Brazil
	Pilosocereus magnificus (Buining & Brederoo) F.Ritter ex D.R.Hunt	Southeast Brazil
	Pilosocereus millspaughii (Britton) Byles & G.D.Rowley	Florida (Locally extinct), The Antilles
	Pilosocereus mollispinus P.J.Braun & Esteves	Goias, Brazil
	Pilosocereus moritzianus (Otto ex Pfeiff.) Byles & G.D.Rowley	Lesser Antilles, Northern Venezuela
	Pilosocereus multicostatus F.Ritter	Southeast Brazil
	Pilosocereus novaromanus F.Oliveira Pereira & Olsthoorn	Eastern Goiás
	Pilosocereus occultiflorus P.J.Braun & Esteves	Minas Gerais, Brazil
	Pilosocereus oligolepis (Vaupel) Byles & G.D.Rowley	Guyana, Brazil, possibly Venezuela
	Pilosocereus pachycladus F.Ritter	Minas Gerais, Brazil
	Pilosocereus parvus (Diers & Esteves) P.J.Braun	Central Brazil
	Pilosocereus pentaedrophorus (Labour.) Byles & G.D.Rowley	East Brazil
	Pilosocereus piauhyensis (Gürke) Byles & G.D.Rowley	Piaui, Brazil
	Pilosocereus polygonus (Lam.) Byles & G.D.Rowley	Central Hispaniola
	Pilosocereus × pseudosuperfloccosus P.J.Braun & Esteves	Bahia, Brazil
	Pilosocereus purpusii (Britton & Rose) Byles & G.D.Rowley	Zacatecas, Mexico
	Pilosocereus pusillibaccatus P.J.Braun & Esteves	North Brazil
	Pilosocereus quadricentralis (E.Y.Dawson) Backeb.	Oaxaca and Chiapas
	Pilosocereus robinii (Lem.) Byles & G.D.Rowley	Florida and the Bahamas
	Pilosocereus rosae P.J.Braun	Minas Gerais, Brazil
	Pilosocereus samanensis Hoxey & Gdaniec	Northeast Dominican Republic
	Pilosocereus splendidus F.Ritter	Bahia, Brazil
	Pilosocereus × subsimilis Rizzini & A.Mattos	Minas Gerais, Brazil
	Pilosocereus tillianus R.Gruber & Schatzl	Mérida, Venezuela
	Pilosocereus ulei (K.Schum.) Byles & G.D.Rowley	South-east Rio de Janeiro
	Pilosocereus vilaboensis (Diers & Esteves) P.J.Braun	West-central Brazil
	Pilosocereus zahrae P.J.Braun	Bahia, Brazil
