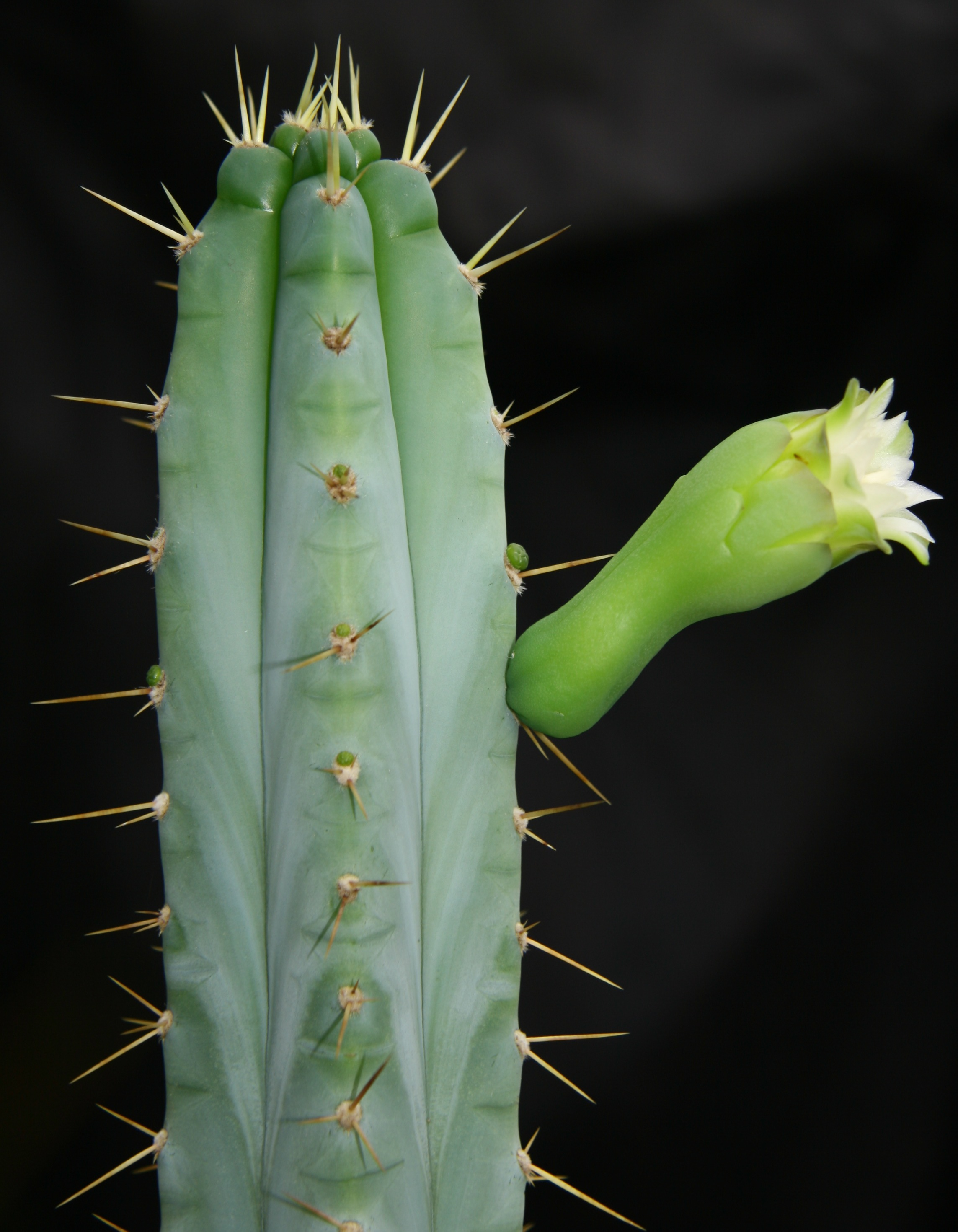

Conservation status
- Least Concern (IUCN 3.1)

Scientific classification
- Kingdom: Plantae
- Clade: Tracheophytes
- Clade: Angiosperms
- Clade: Eudicots
- Order: Caryophyllales
- Family: Cactaceae
- Subfamily: Cactoideae
- Genus: Pilosocereus
- Species: P. pentaedrophorus

Binomial name
- Pilosocereus pentaedrophorus (Labour.) Byles & G.D.Rowley

Synonyms
- Cereus pentaedrophorus Cels.; Pilocereus pentaedrophorus (Cels) Console ex K.Schum..; Pilocereus pentaedropkorus Console; Pilocereus pentaedropkorus Console ex C.F.Först. & Rümpler

= Pilosocereus pentaedrophorus =

Species of plant

Pilosocereus pentaedrophorus is a species of tree cactus found in Bahia and Minas Gerais, Brazil.

== Description ==
It is a branched plant growing to 3 or more meters tall, often found on rocky outcrops. The stem consists of 5-7 ribs 3 centimeters wide. Stems are often covered in a blue glaucous farina. Areoles are round or oval, 3-4 millimeters wide, 3-4 millimeters wide. This species is one of the only ones in the genus Pilosocereus without a cephalium. Flowers grow directly out of the areoles. Fruits are globose with red flesh and dark black seeds.

== Taxonomy ==
Originally described 1957 and was at one time classified as Cephalocereus and Cereus.

== Pollination and dispersa ==
Like other Pilosocereus, Pilosocereus pentaedrophorus is likely pollinated by bats or insects as the flowers have a strong, rotten smell. Fruits are dispersed by frugivores such as bats.
