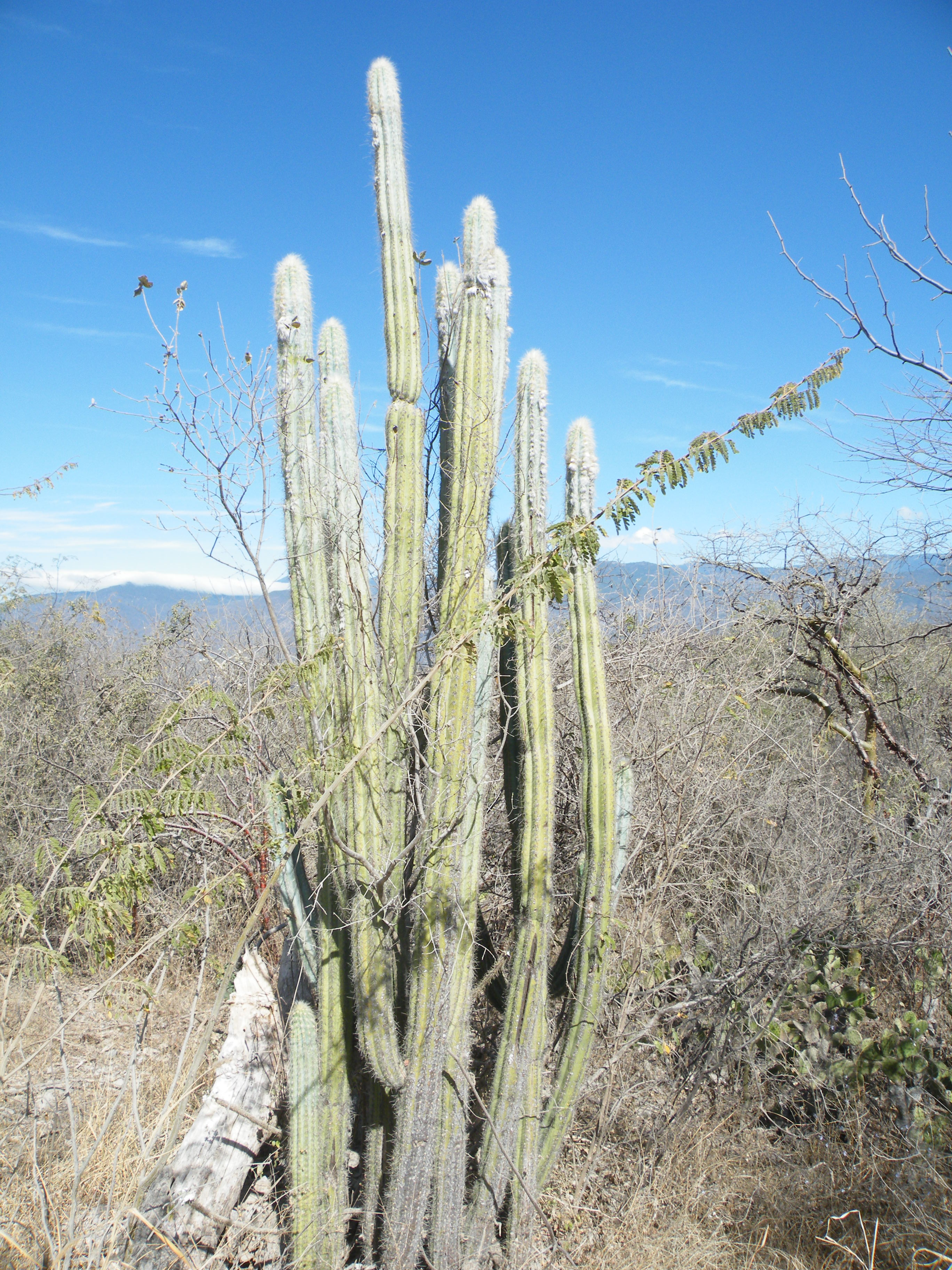

Conservation status
- Endangered (IUCN 3.1)

Scientific classification
- Kingdom: Plantae
- Clade: Tracheophytes
- Clade: Angiosperms
- Clade: Eudicots
- Order: Caryophyllales
- Family: Cactaceae
- Subfamily: Cactoideae
- Genus: Pilosocereus
- Species: P. quadricentralis

Binomial name
- Pilosocereus quadricentralis (E.Y.Dawson) Backeb. 1960

Synonyms
- Cephalocereus quadricentralis E.Y.Dawson 1948

= Pilosocereus quadricentralis =

Species of cactus

Pilosocereus quadricentralis is a species of Pilosocereus found in Oaxaca and Chiapas States of Mexico.

== Description ==
Pilosocereus quadricentralis is a tree-like cactus that features a distinct trunk and branches that grow well above the base, reaching heights of up to 5 meters. Its upright, glaucoma-green shoots are 7 to 8 centimeters in diameter and have 8 ribs. The spines are thickened at the bulbous base, starting as brownish-red and turning gray over time. The four central spines spread out, measuring 2 to 3.5 centimeters long, while the 11 to 13 radial spines spread out and are 10 to 20 millimeters long. The flowering area is clearly defined, located laterally or near the tip of the shoot, and is covered with abundant white wool.

The flowers are large, though further details are not provided. The spherical fruits can reach diameters of up to 4 centimeters.

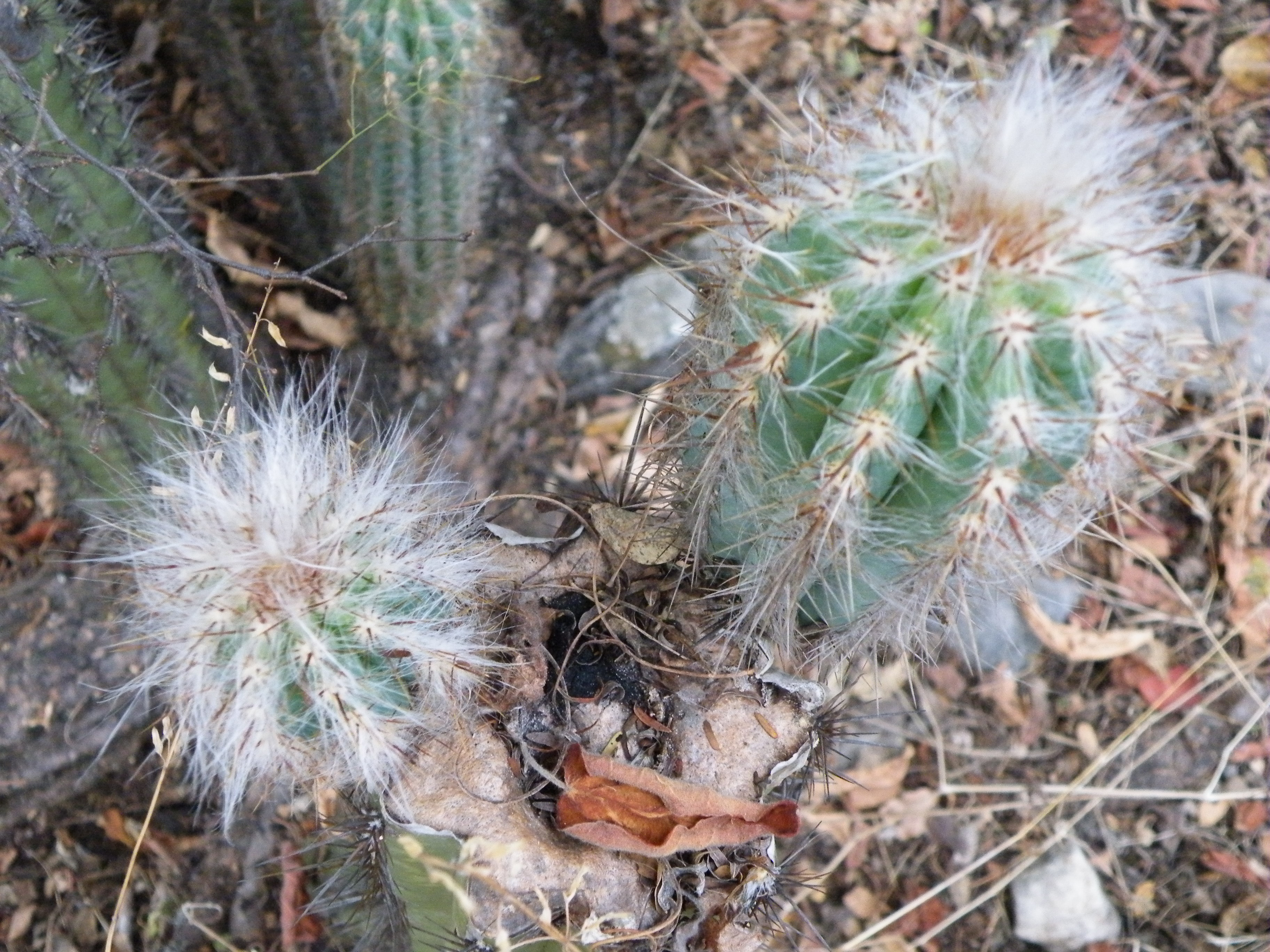
Small plants

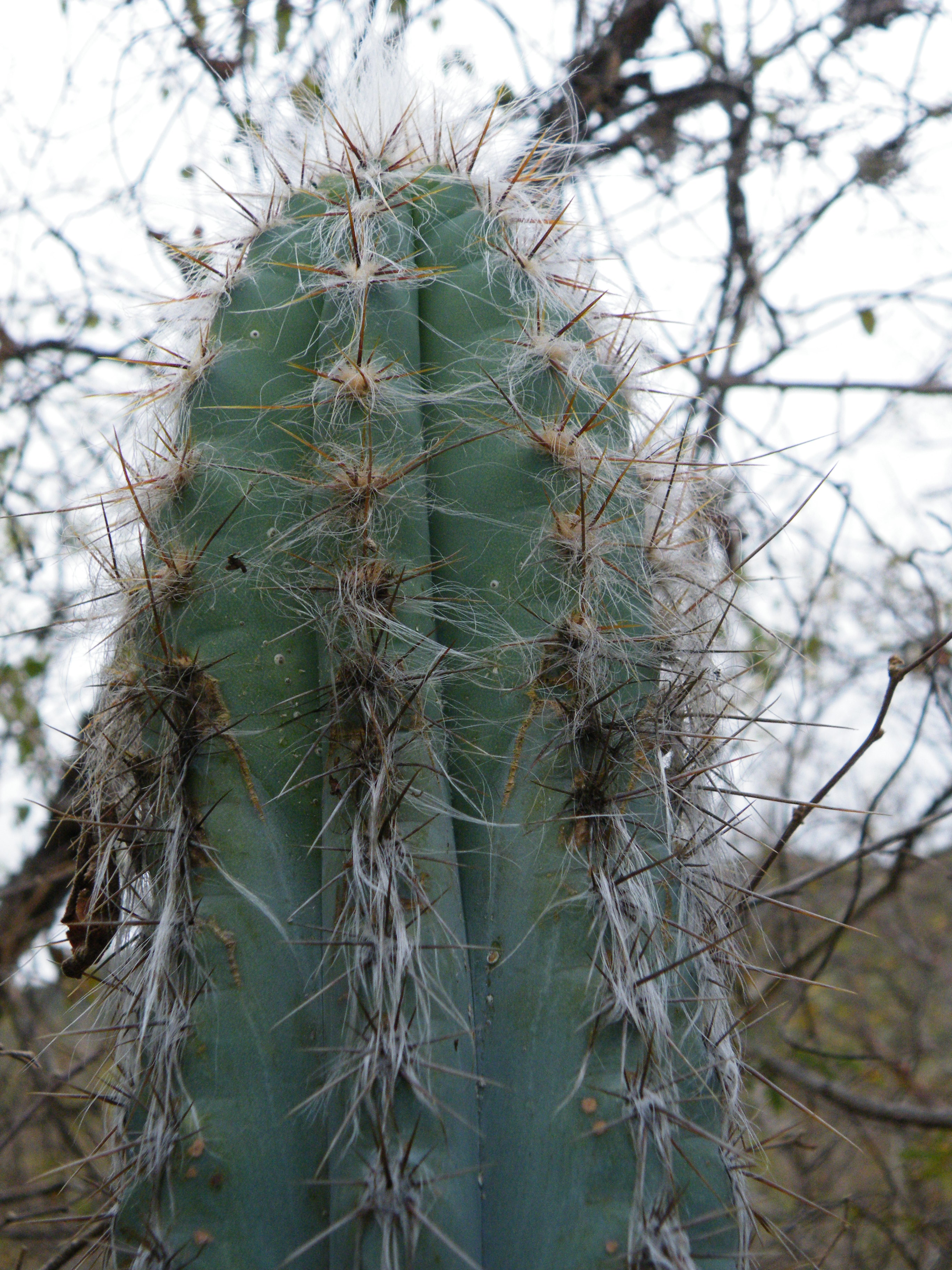
Top

== Distribution ==
This species is native to the Mexican states of Oaxaca and Chiapas.

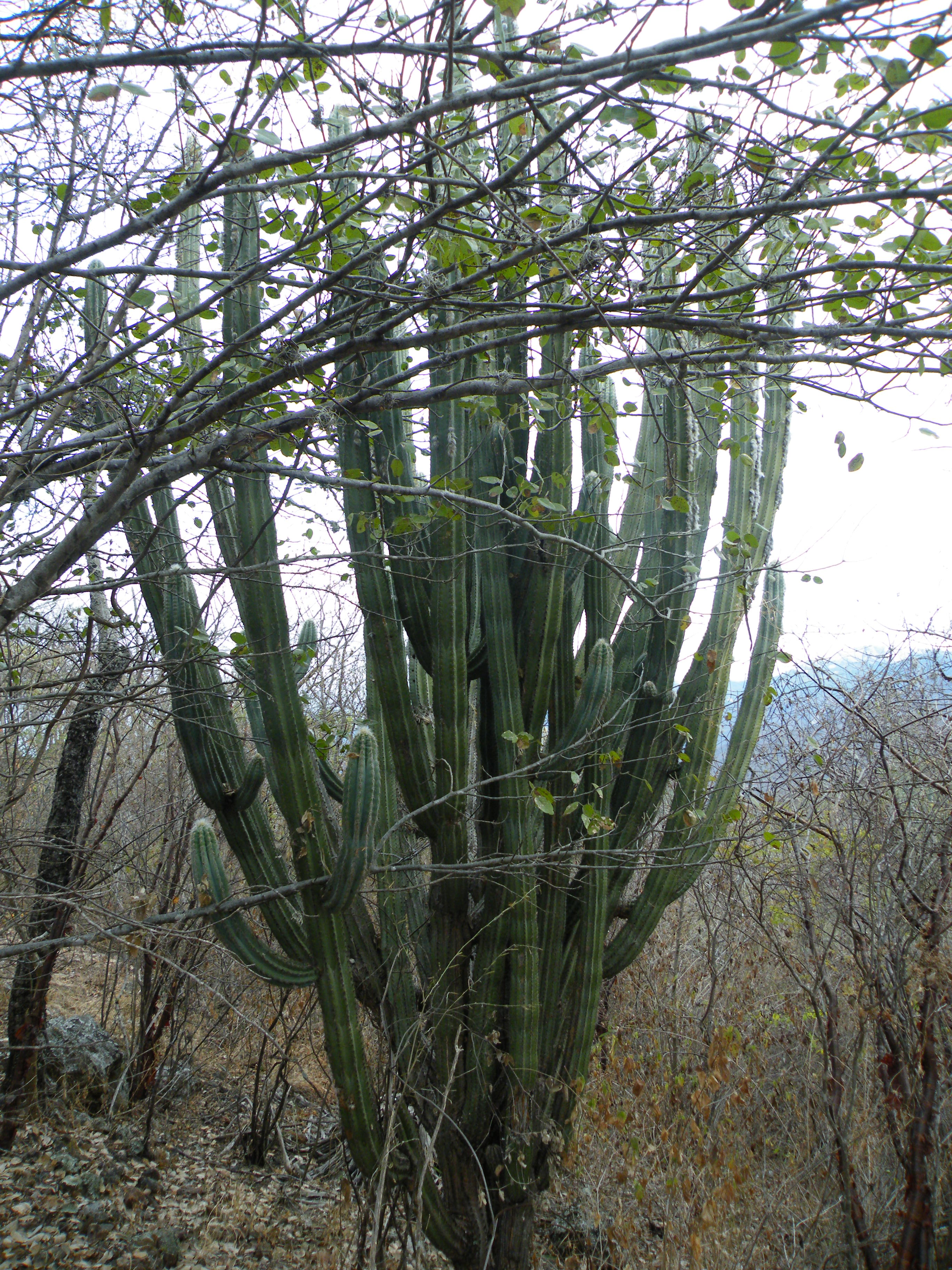
Plants growing in habitat on the way to Tomellin, Oaxaca

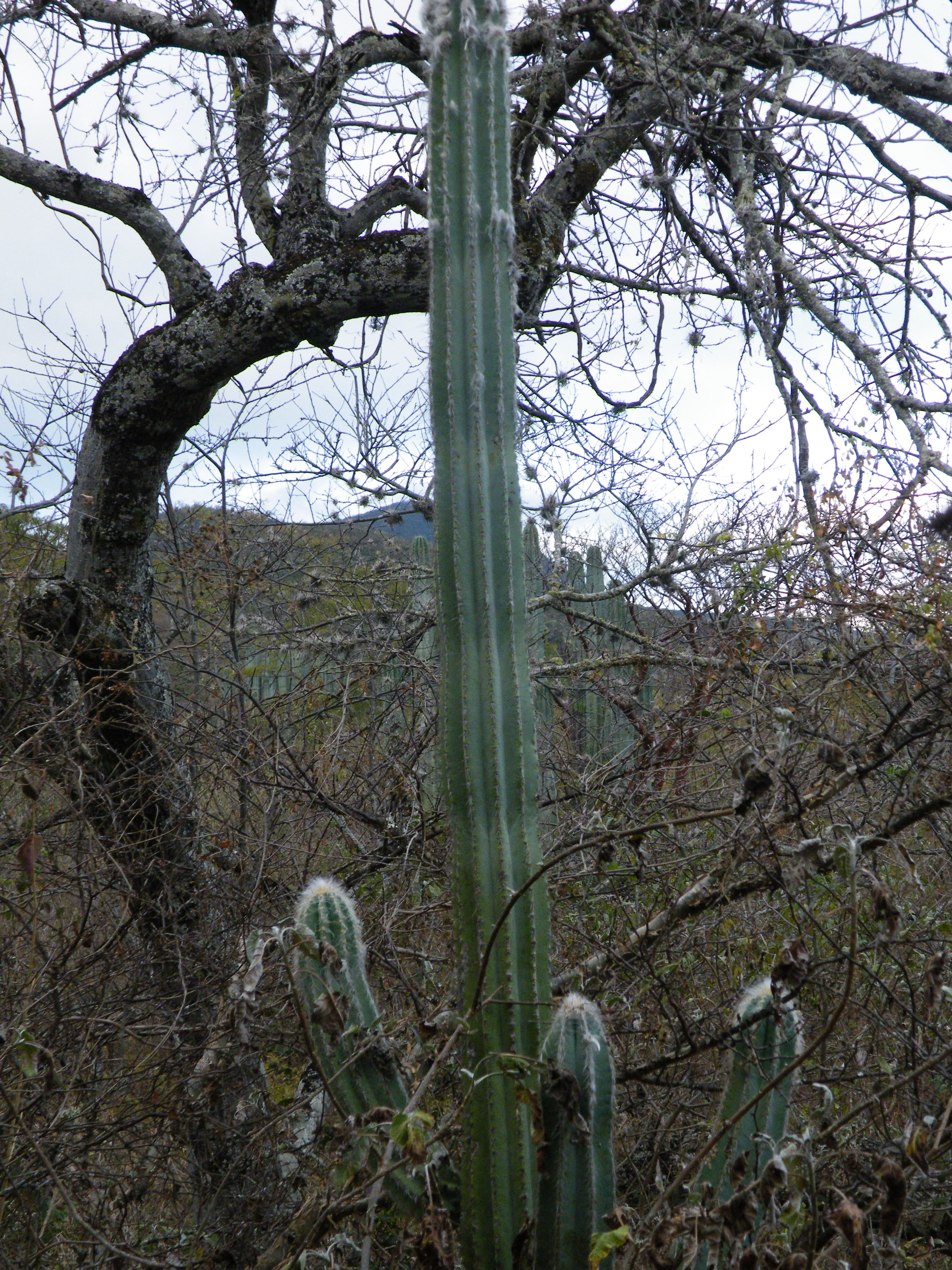
Plants growing in habitat on the way to Tomellin, Oaxaca

== Taxonomy ==
The first scientific description was published in 1948 by Elmer Yale Dawson under the name Cephalocereus quadricentralis. The name "quadricentralis" refers to the presence of four central spines. In 1960, Curt Backeberg reclassified the species into the genus Pilosocereus.
