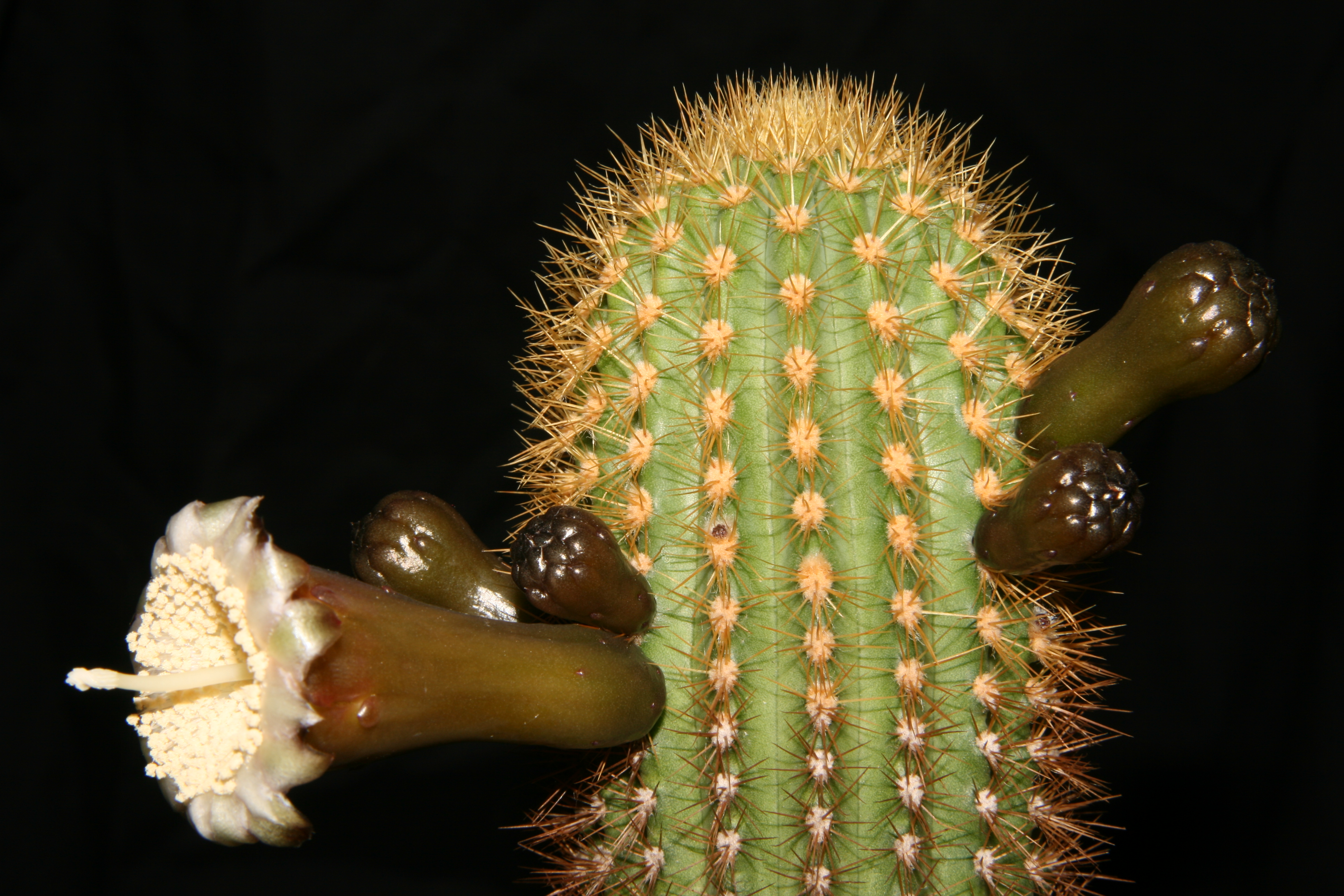

Conservation status
- Least Concern (IUCN 3.1)

Scientific classification
- Kingdom: Plantae
- Clade: Tracheophytes
- Clade: Angiosperms
- Clade: Eudicots
- Order: Caryophyllales
- Family: Cactaceae
- Subfamily: Cactoideae
- Genus: Pilosocereus
- Species: P. piauhyensis

Binomial name
- Pilosocereus piauhyensis (Gürke) Byles & G.D.Rowley

= Pilosocereus piauhyensis =

Species of cactus

Pilosocereus piauhyensis is a species of plant in the family Cactaceae. It is endemic to Brazil, in the states of Piauí, Ceará, and Rio Grande do Norte. Its natural habitat is rocky areas.
