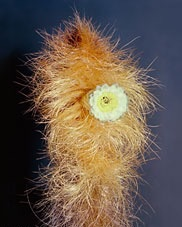

Conservation status
- Critically Endangered (IUCN 3.1)

Scientific classification
- Kingdom: Plantae
- Clade: Tracheophytes
- Clade: Angiosperms
- Clade: Eudicots
- Order: Caryophyllales
- Family: Cactaceae
- Subfamily: Cactoideae
- Genus: Pilosocereus
- Species: P. diersianus

Binomial name
- Pilosocereus diersianus (Esteves) P.J.Braun

Synonyms
- Pseudopilocereus diersianus Esteves

= Pilosocereus diersianus =

Species of cactus

Pilosocereus diersianus is a species of cactus native to Tocantins and Goiás Only around 50 remain in the wild. This species is commonly known as Facherio De Goiás in Brazil

== Description ==
Pilosocereus diersianus is a columnar cactus, growing up to 2 meters tall. The stems are 5–9 cm wide and bluish green in color. The ribs are thin, only 5–8 mm vwide. The oval areoles are 2-4 by 3-5mm. The pseudocephalic areoles are broad, sometimes interrupted, and are adorned with bluish-white wool up to 10 cm long. 20-30 thin and flexible spines radiate from areoles; about 10 spines are in the center. Spines are at first brown but become gray with age. The tubular white flowers emerge from the pseudocephalium, not even a little curved. Few triangular scales are found on the flower. The olive colored fruits are globose are 2.5-3 centimeters in diameter. Once ripe, the red, juicy pulp is revealed.

The type locality is located in Northeastern Minas Gerais.

== Taxonomy ==
Pilosocereus diersianus was originally described as Pseudopilocereus diersianus in 1981. When Pseudopilocereus with dissolved in 1988, it was moved to Pilosocereus.

== Etymology ==
The specific epithet "Diersianus" refers to Prof. Dr. Lothar Diers (1932–Present)
