= Pilosocereus flavipulvinatus =

Conservation status
- Least Concern (IUCN 3.1)

Scientific classification
- Kingdom: Plantae
- Clade: Tracheophytes
- Clade: Angiosperms
- Clade: Eudicots
- Order: Caryophyllales
- Family: Cactaceae
- Subfamily: Cactoideae
- Genus: Pilosocereus
- Species: P. flavipulvinatus

Binomial name
- Pilosocereus flavipulvinatus (Buining & Brederoo) F.Ritter

Synonyms
- Pilosocereus carolinensis F.Ritter; Pilosocereus carolinensis var. robustispinus F.Ritter; Pilosocereus flavipulvinatus var. carolinensis (F.Ritter) F.Ritter; Pilosocereus flavipulvinatus subsp. carolinensis (F.Ritter) P.J.Braun & Esteves; Pilosocereus flavipulvinatus var. robustispinus (F.Ritter) P.J.Braun & Esteves; Pseudopilocereus carolinensis (F.Ritter) P.V.Heath; Pseudopilocereus carolinensis var. robustispinus (F.Ritter) P.V.Heath

Species of cactus

Pilosocereus flavipulvinatus is a species of cactus native to Northern and Northeastern Brazil.

== Description ==
Pilosocereus flavipulvinatus features a blue-green stems, growing up to 4–5 m tall and 5 cm in diameter. 7-8 rounded ribs 12 mm in width are present on the stems. Spaced 15 mm apart, the oval areoles have 10 radial spines and 4-5 radial spines. The spines are at first yellow, but they become gray with age. spines are 2.8 cm long. The campanulate flowers are up to 6.8 cm long and are covered in small scales. The fruit is 3.8 by 2.2 cm.

The type locality is located Simplício Mendes, piaui, Brazil at 350 m above sea level.

== Etymology ==
The specific epithet flavipulvinatus comes from the Latin flāvus meaning yellow and the Latin pulvīnātus meaning cushioned. The epithet refers to the yellow-cushioned areoles.
