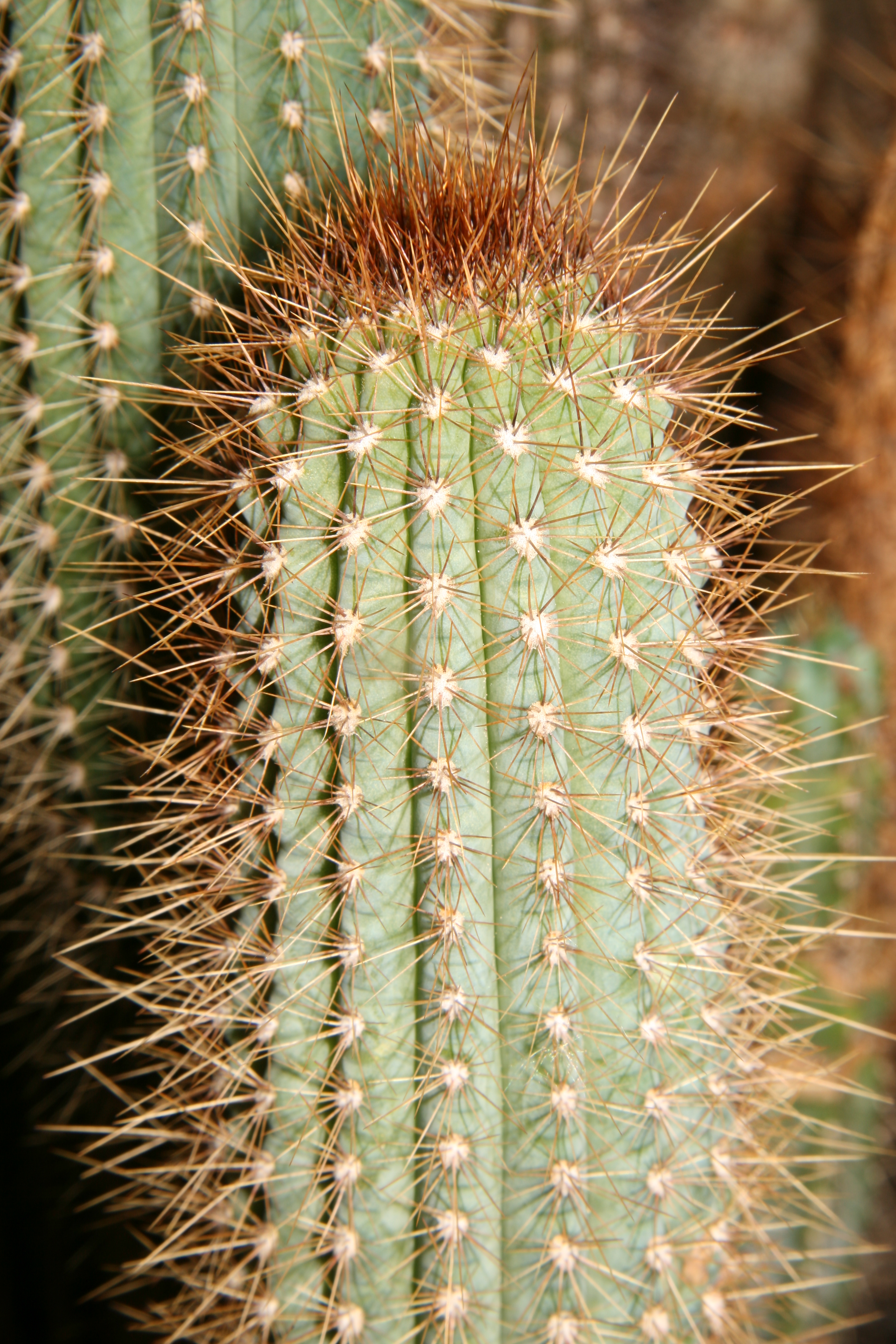

Scientific classification
- Kingdom: Plantae
- Clade: Tracheophytes
- Clade: Angiosperms
- Clade: Eudicots
- Order: Caryophyllales
- Family: Cactaceae
- Subfamily: Cactoideae
- Genus: Pilosocereus
- Species: P. mollispinus

Binomial name
- Pilosocereus mollispinus P.J. Braun & Esteves

= Pilosocereus mollispinus =

Species of cactus

Pilosocereus mollispinus is a species of cactus native to Brazil.

== Description ==
Pilosocereus mollispinus is a shrubby cactus that reaches heights of up to 2.3 meters. The dark green to grayish-green shoots have a diameter of up to 8.5 centimeters and have 13 to 16 ribs. The areoles are spaced 7 to 12 millimeters apart, and have 13 to 16 soft, flexible non-prickly gray spines. The radial spines are up to 1.3 centimeters long, and the central spines are up to 2.3 centimeters long. Stems have little to no cephalium.

The funnel-shaped flowers are about 4.5 centimeters long and reach a diameter of up to 3.4 centimeters. The flower tube is green, and the bracts are white. The fruits are greenish, having a diameter of up to 3 centimeters and contain white flesh. The fruits contain small, black seeds.

== Taxonomy ==
Pilosocereus mollispinus was described 2004 by Pierre Josef Braun and Eddie Esteves. The specific epithet "mollispinus" refers to the soft spines.
