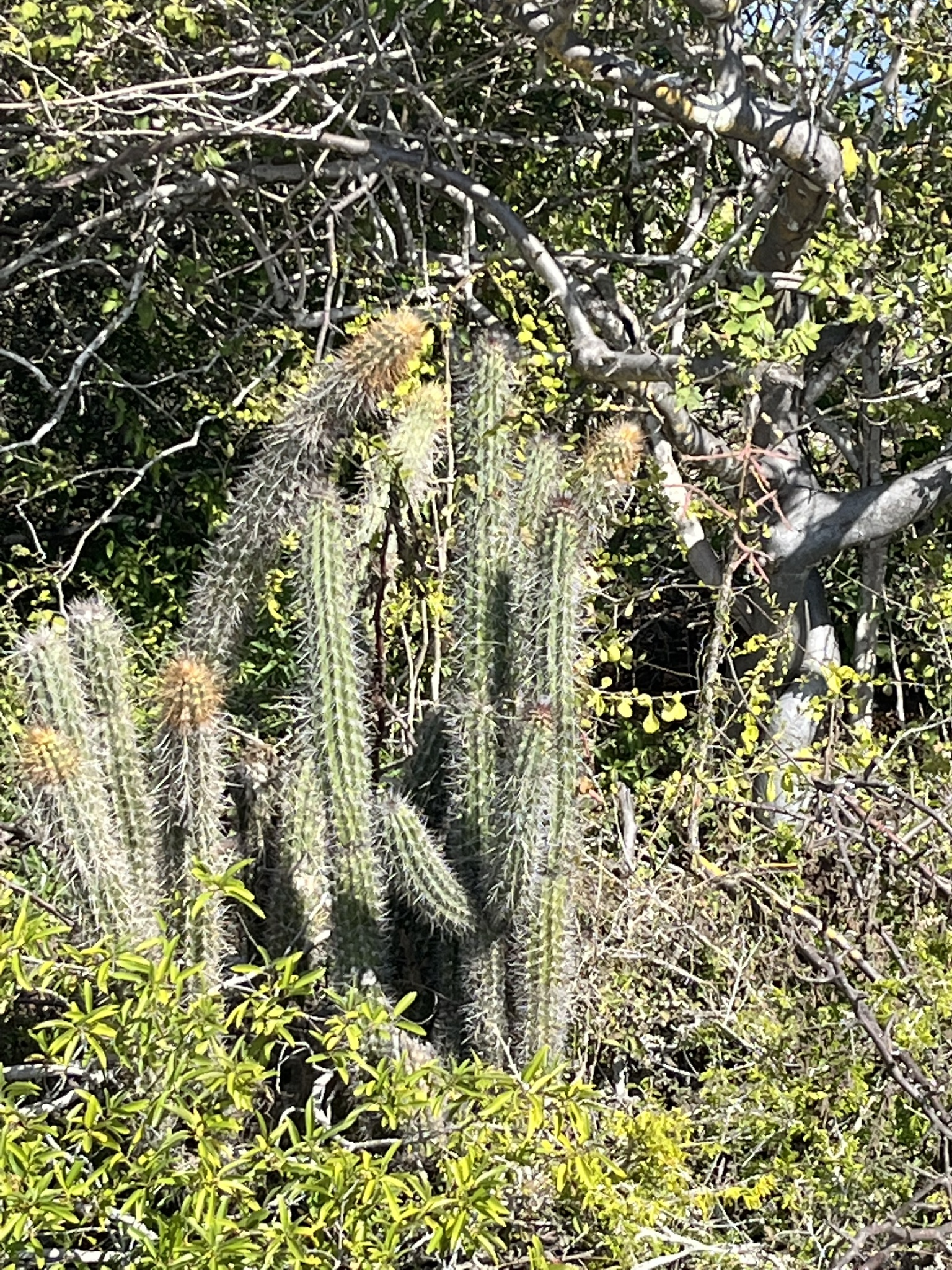

Scientific classification
- Kingdom: Plantae
- Clade: Embryophytes
- Clade: Tracheophytes
- Clade: Spermatophytes
- Clade: Angiosperms
- Clade: Eudicots
- Order: Caryophyllales
- Family: Cactaceae
- Subfamily: Cactoideae
- Genus: Pilosocereus
- Species: P. collinsii

Binomial name
- Pilosocereus collinsii (Britton & Rose) Byles & G.D.Rowley

Synonyms
- Cephalocereus collinsii Britton & Rose; Pilocereus collinsii (Britton & Rose) F.M.Knuth

= Pilosocereus collinsii =

Species of cactus

Pilosocereus collinsii is a species of cactus native to Oaxaca, Mexico.

== Description ==
Pilosocereus collinsii grows up to 3 meters tall, having slender stems 3-4 cm in diameter. Each stem has around 7 obtuse ribs. Numerous acicular spines are found on the areoles; the areoles are spaced 1.5 cm apart. Up to 5 cm long, the flowers are born on the stem tips. Fruits are globular, somewhat depressed, and 3 cm long. The black seeds are 1.5 to 2 mm long.

== Taxonomy ==
Pilosocereus collinsii was originally described in 1923 as Cephalocereus collinsii by Britton and Rose. Cephalocereus collinsii was then recombined, becoming the name Pilocereus collinsii. Finally, Pilocereus was transferred to the current genus Pilosocereus, resulting in the current name. Some sources consider Pilosocereus collinsii as a synonym of Pilosocereus purpusii, however, most sources do not accept this treatment.

== Etymology ==
The specific epithet "Collinsii" refers G. N. Collins, who first reported this plant in 1902.
