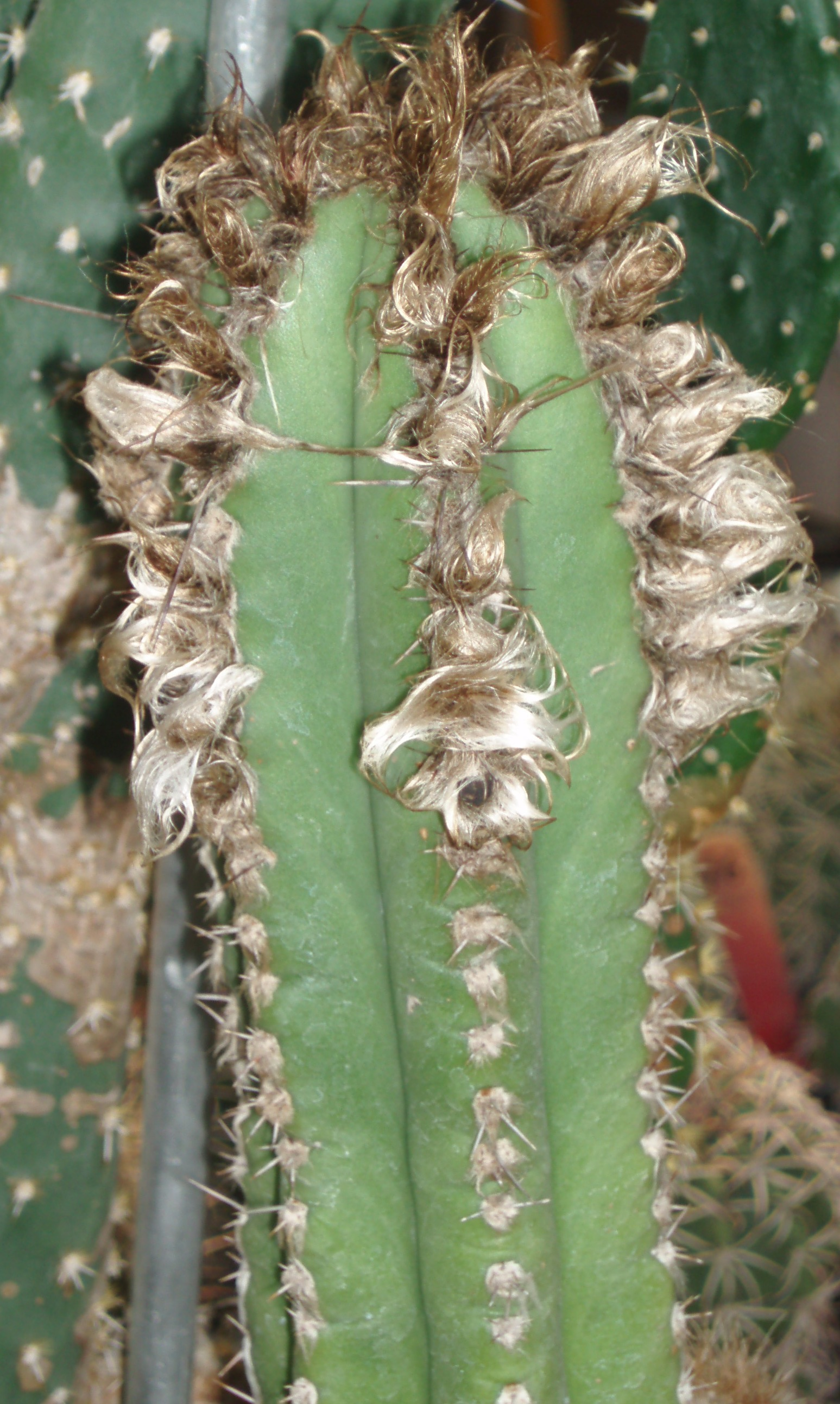
- Pilosocereus floccosus

Conservation status
- Least Concern (IUCN 3.1)

Scientific classification
- Kingdom: Plantae
- Clade: Tracheophytes
- Clade: Angiosperms
- Clade: Eudicots
- Order: Caryophyllales
- Family: Cactaceae
- Subfamily: Cactoideae
- Genus: Pilosocereus
- Species: P. floccosus

Binomial name
- Pilosocereus floccosus Byles & G.D.Rowley

= Pilosocereus floccosus =

Species of cactus

Pilosocereus floccosus is a species of plant in the family Cactaceae. It is endemic to Brazil, in Bahia and Minas Gerais states. Its natural habitats are subtropical or tropical dry forests and rocky areas. It is threatened by habitat loss.

== Subspecies ==
- Pilosocereus floccosus subsp. floccosus
- Pilosocereus floccosus subsp. quadricostatus (F.Ritter) Zappi
