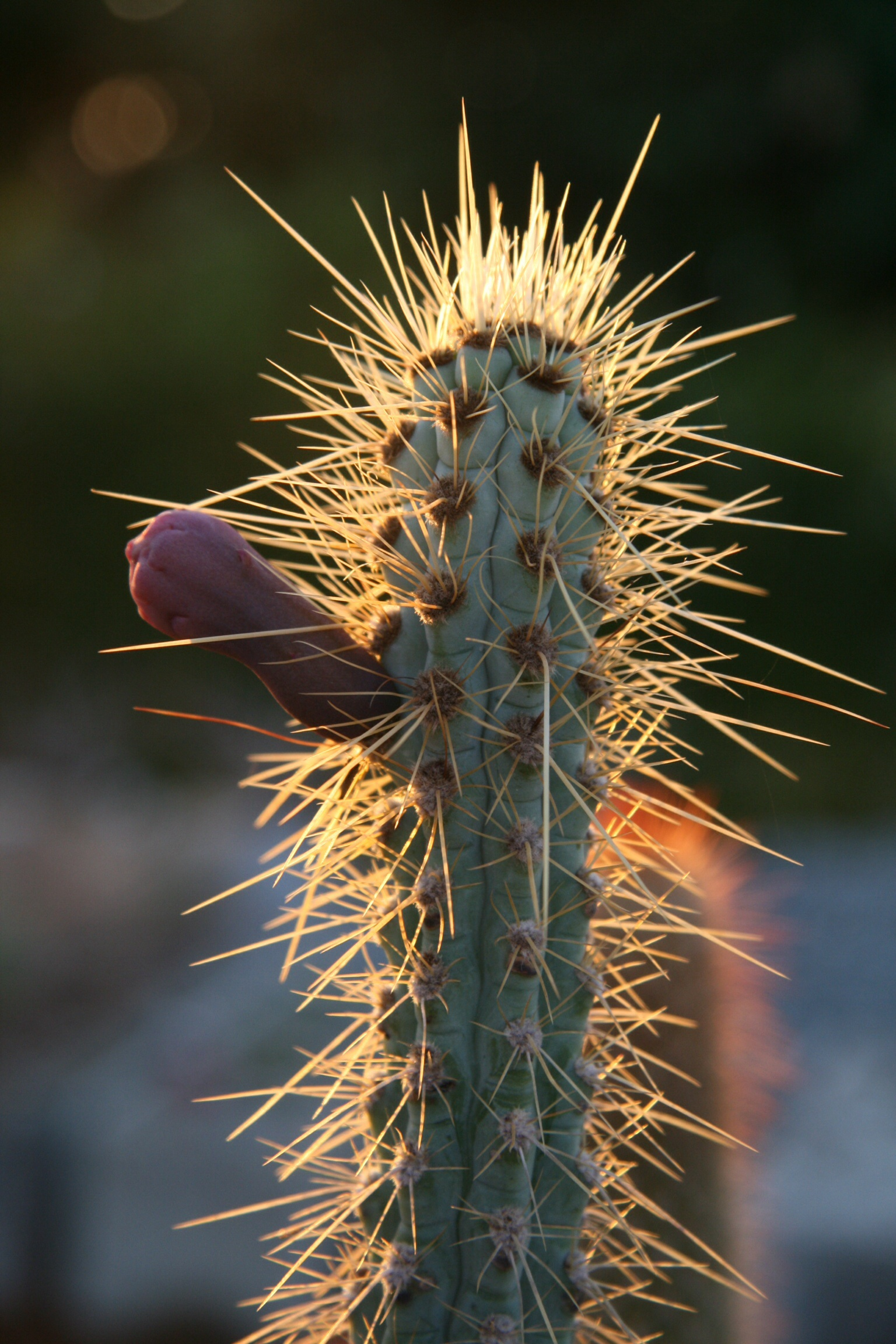

Conservation status
- Least Concern (IUCN 3.1)

Scientific classification
- Kingdom: Plantae
- Clade: Tracheophytes
- Clade: Angiosperms
- Clade: Eudicots
- Order: Caryophyllales
- Family: Cactaceae
- Subfamily: Cactoideae
- Genus: Pilosocereus
- Species: P. glaucochrous

Binomial name
- Pilosocereus glaucochrous (Werderm.) Byles & G.D.Rowley

= Pilosocereus glaucochrous =

Species of cactus

Pilosocereus glaucochrous is a species of plant in the family Cactaceae. It is endemic to eastern Brazil, in central Bahia state. Its natural habitat is subtropical or tropical dry forests. It is threatened by habitat loss.
