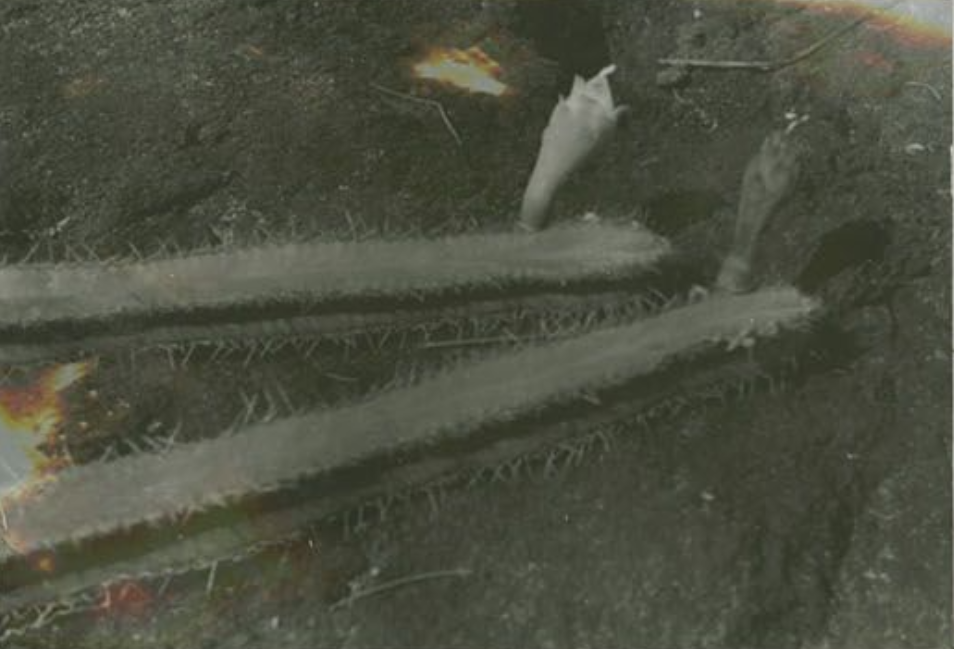

Conservation status
- Data Deficient (IUCN 3.1)

Scientific classification
- Kingdom: Plantae
- Clade: Tracheophytes
- Clade: Angiosperms
- Clade: Eudicots
- Order: Caryophyllales
- Family: Cactaceae
- Subfamily: Cactoideae
- Genus: Pilosocereus (Werderm.) Byles & G.D.Rowley
- Species: P. kanukuensis

Binomial name
- Pilosocereus kanukuensis (Alexander) Leuenb.

Synonyms
- Cephalocereus kanukuensis Alexander; Pilosocereus oligolepis subsp. kanukuensis (Alexander) P.J.Braun & Esteves

= Pilosocereus kanukuensis =

Species of cactus

Pilosocereus kanukuensis is a species of plant in the family Cactaceae. It is endemic to the slopes of the Kanuku Mountains in Guyana. Its natural habitat is seasonally dry slopes. It is known from only one collection made in 1938. It is sometimes considered conspecific with Pilosocereus oligolepis.
