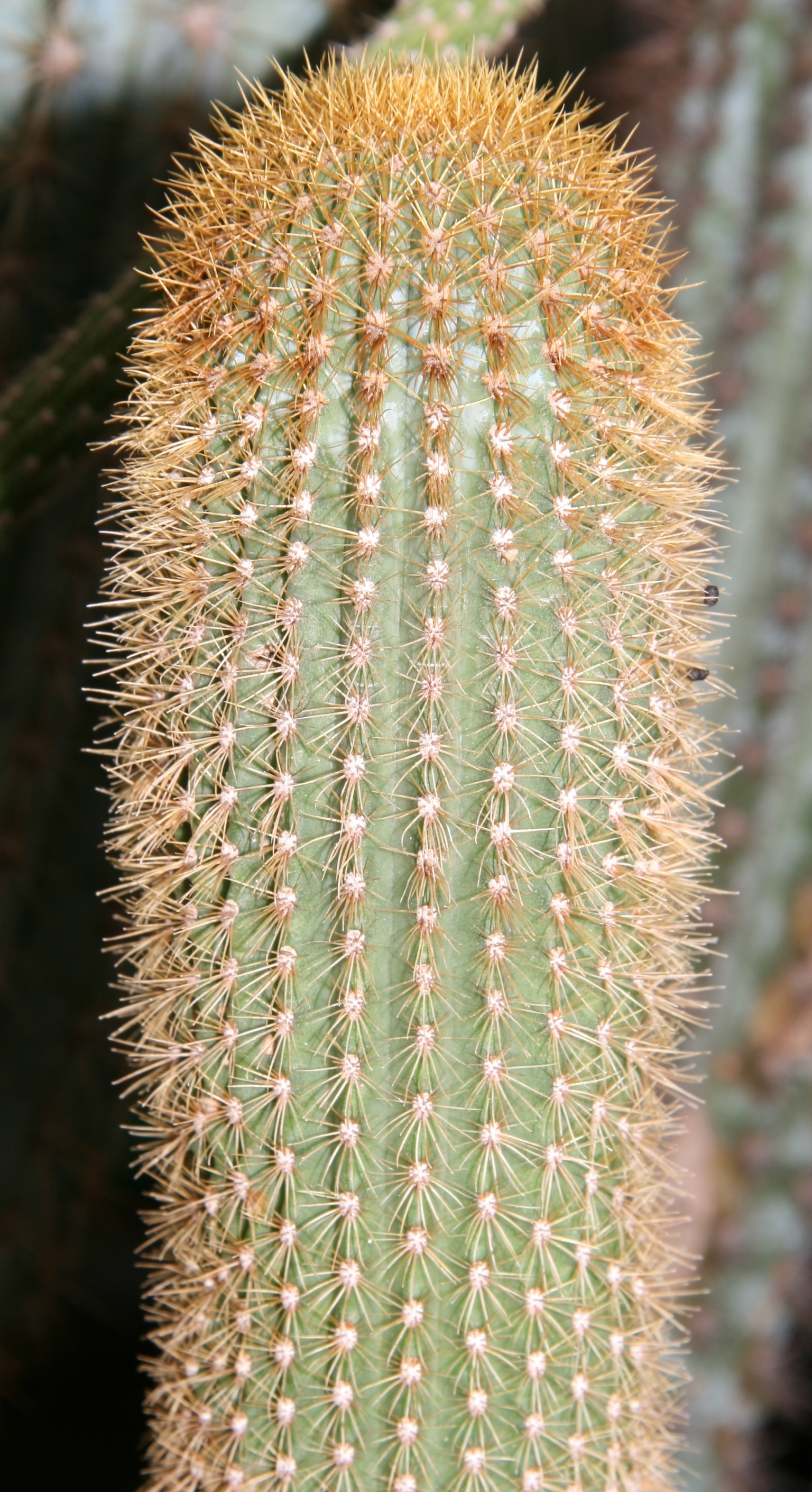

Conservation status
- Endangered (IUCN 3.1)

Scientific classification
- Kingdom: Plantae
- Clade: Tracheophytes
- Clade: Angiosperms
- Clade: Eudicots
- Order: Caryophyllales
- Family: Cactaceae
- Subfamily: Cactoideae
- Genus: Pilosocereus
- Species: P. multicostatus

Binomial name
- Pilosocereus multicostatus F.Ritter

= Pilosocereus multicostatus =

Species of cactus

Pilosocereus multicostatus is a species of plant in the family Cactaceae. It is endemic to Brazil, in northern Minas Gerais state. Its natural habitat are rocky areas. It is threatened by habitat loss.
