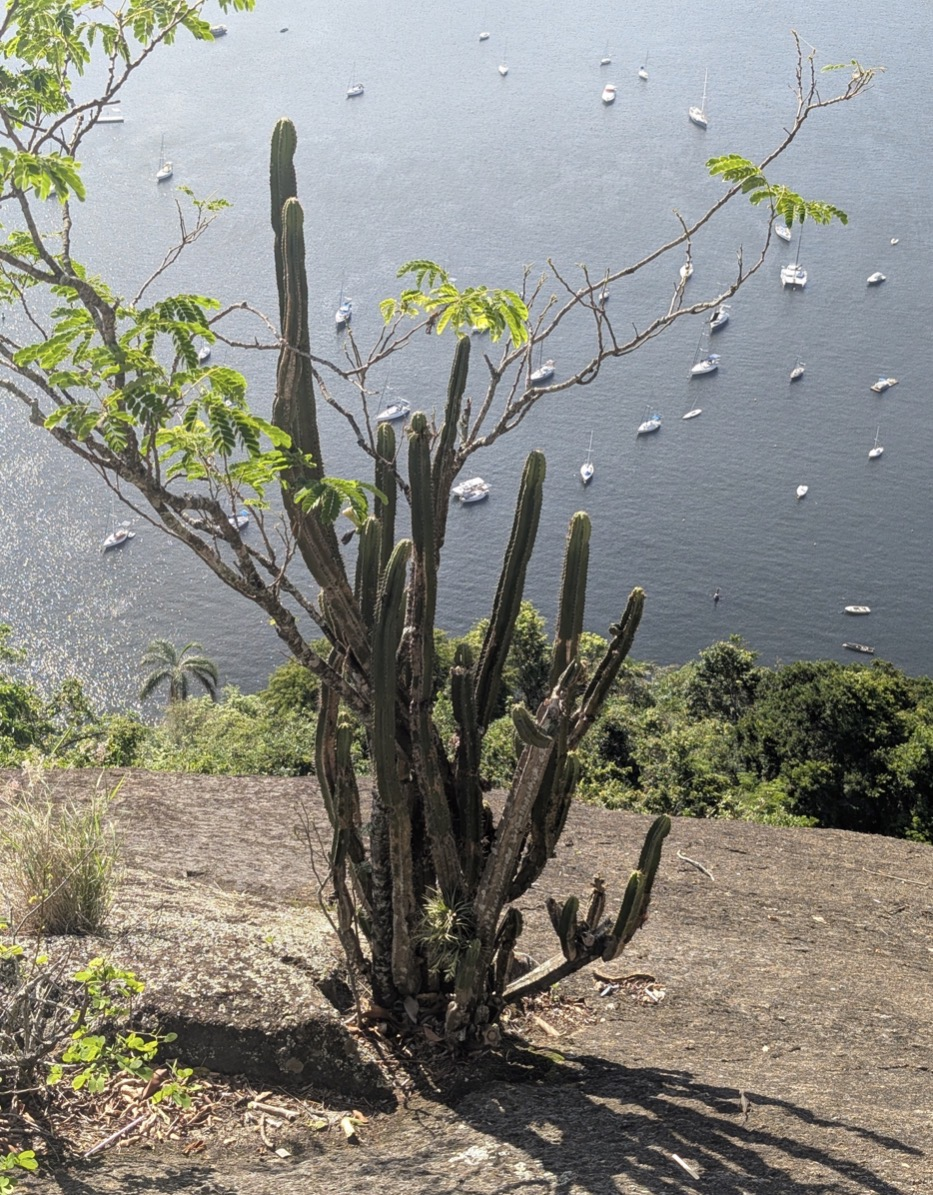

Scientific classification
- Kingdom: Plantae
- Clade: Embryophytes
- Clade: Tracheophytes
- Clade: Angiosperms
- Clade: Eudicots
- Order: Caryophyllales
- Family: Cactaceae
- Subfamily: Cactoideae
- Genus: Pilosocereus
- Species: P. brasiliensis

Binomial name
- Pilosocereus brasiliensis (Britton & Rose) Backeb.

= Pilosocereus brasiliensis =

Species of cactus

Pilosocereus brasiliensis is a species of cactus native to Eastern Brazil.

== Description ==
Pilosocereus brasiliensis is a somewhat branched tree-like cactus, up to 3 meters tall, and weakly branched. Somewhat glaucous when young, the branches turn green when older. The branches, having 4-5 ribs are nearly square at the base, but are more obtuse at the top. Areoles are closely spaced, with white hairs longer than the spines. A cephalium is present.

== Habitat ==
Pilosocereus brasiliensis is found on localized rocky outcrops in Northeastern Brazil.

== Ecology ==
Pilosocereus brasiliensis subsp. ruschianus is known to grow with Coleocephalocereus aff. pluricostatus.

== Etymology ==
The epithet "brasiliensis" refers to the plant being found in Brazil.

== Taxonomy ==
Pilosocereus brasiliensis contains the following subspecies:

- Pilosocereus brasiliensis subsp. ruschianus
- Pilosocereus brasiliensis subsp. brasiliensis
