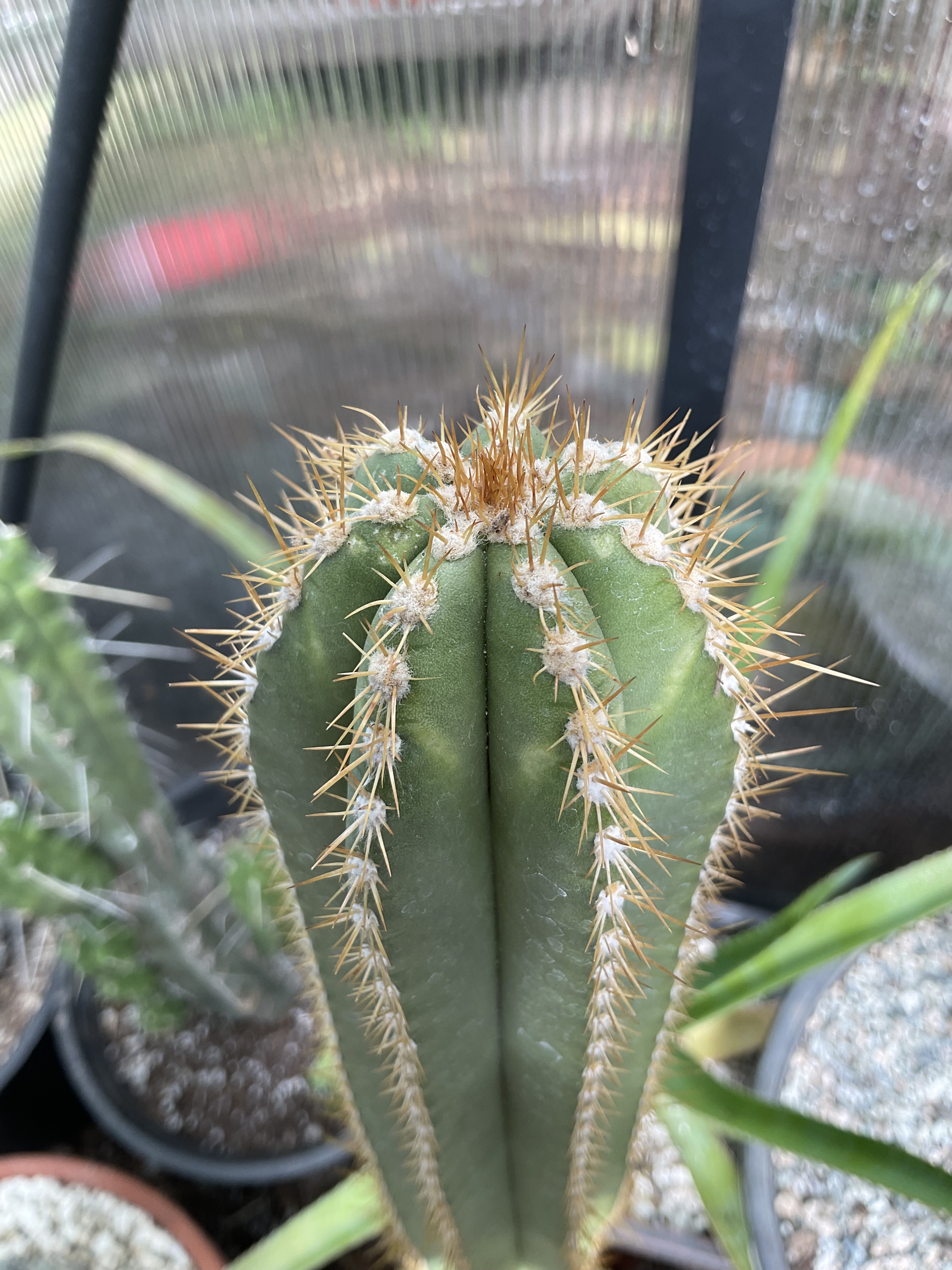

Conservation status
- Critically Endangered (IUCN 3.1)

Scientific classification
- Kingdom: Plantae
- Clade: Tracheophytes
- Clade: Angiosperms
- Clade: Eudicots
- Order: Caryophyllales
- Family: Cactaceae
- Subfamily: Cactoideae
- Genus: Pilosocereus
- Species: P. azulensis

Binomial name
- Pilosocereus azulensis N.P.Taylor & Zappi

= Pilosocereus azulensis =

Species of cactus

Pilosocereus azulensis is a species of plant in the family Cactaceae. It is endemic to Brazil. Its natural habitat is subtropical or tropical dry forests. It is threatened by habitat loss. Pilosocereus azulensis is commonly referred to as Xique-Xique-Azul or Facheiro do Azul in Brazil although it has no affiliation with the genus Xiquexique.

== Description ==
Pilosocereus azulensis is a tree-like or shrubby cactus that branches above its base and can grow up to 10 meters tall. Its smooth shoots, which range in color from olive green to a bluish hue, have a diameter of 8 to 9.5 centimeters. The shoots possess 6 to 12 ribs, often marked by transverse furrows. The areoles are spaced 5 to 7 millimeters apart and bear slender, opaque spines that are yellowish-brown in color. Each shoot has between 1 and 11 central spines that are 0.5 to 4 centimeters long, and 8 to 12 radial spines that spread out and measure 3 to 13 millimeters. The flowering portion of the shoots is not very prominent, with flowers emerging from areoles located on 1 to 3 ribs at the tip of the shoots or just below. These flowers are adorned with white to gray hairs up to 3 centimeters in length.

The flowers are wide-open and light green on the outside, measuring 5.5 to 6.7 centimeters long and 4.7 to 7 centimeters in diameter. The fruits are depressingly spherical, with diameters of 4.2 to 6 centimeters, and they split open laterally to reveal magenta-colored flesh.

== Distribution ==
Pilosocereus azulensis can be found in Pedra Azul municipality, in the Brazilian state of Minas Gerais.

== Taxonomy ==
It was first described in 1997 by Nigel Paul Taylor and Daniela Cristina Zappi. The name "azulensis" refers to its type location in Pedra Azul National Park.
