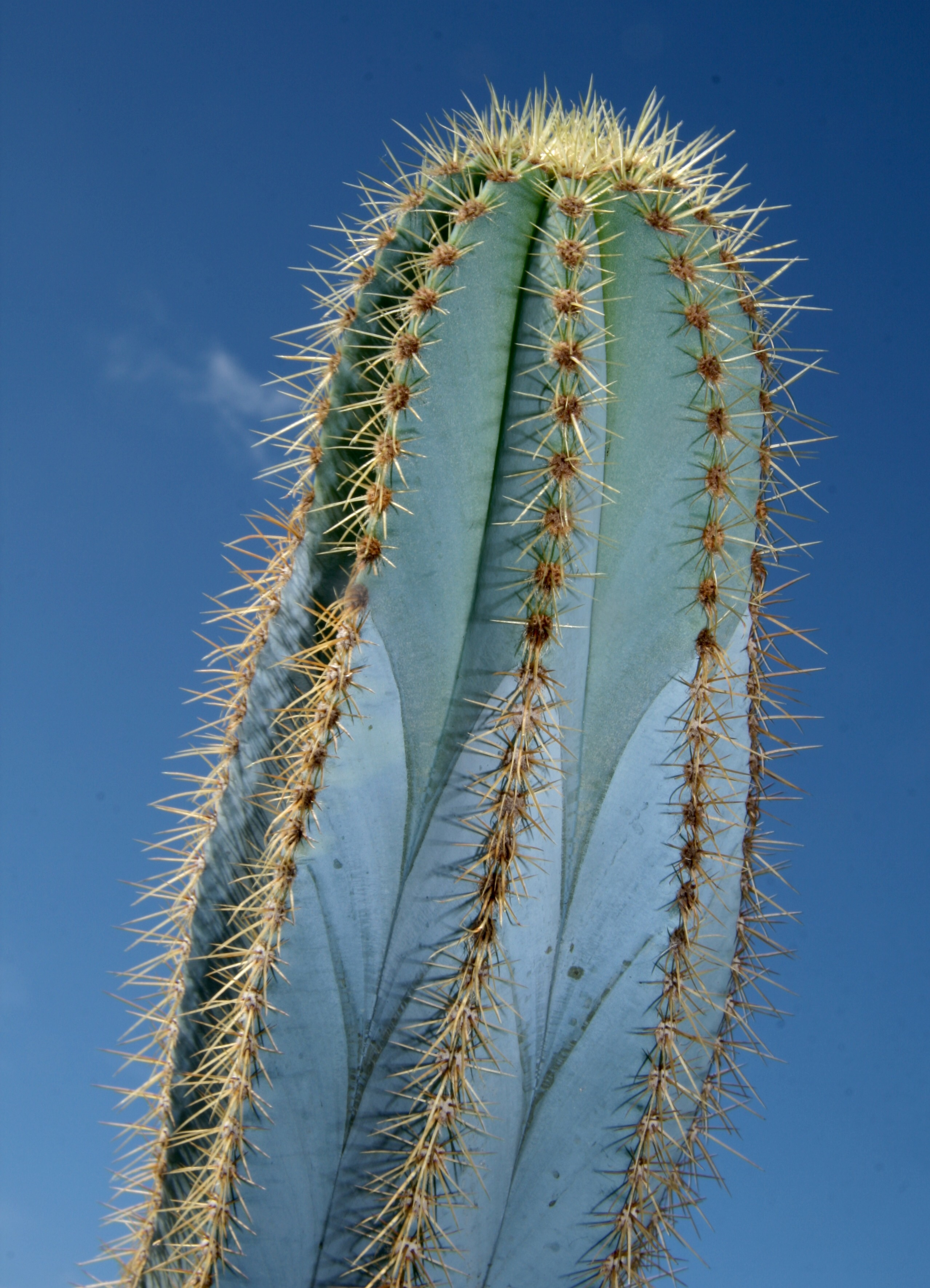

Conservation status
- Endangered (IUCN 3.1)

Scientific classification
- Kingdom: Plantae
- Clade: Tracheophytes
- Clade: Angiosperms
- Clade: Eudicots
- Order: Caryophyllales
- Family: Cactaceae
- Subfamily: Cactoideae
- Genus: Pilosocereus
- Species: P. magnificus

Binomial name
- Pilosocereus magnificus (Buining & Brederoo) F.Ritter

= Pilosocereus magnificus =

Species of cactus

Pilosocereus magnificus is a species of plant in the family Cactaceae. It is endemic to Brazil, within Minas Gerais state. Its natural habitats are subtropical or tropical dry forests, subtropical or tropical dry shrubland, and rocky areas. It is threatened by habitat loss.
