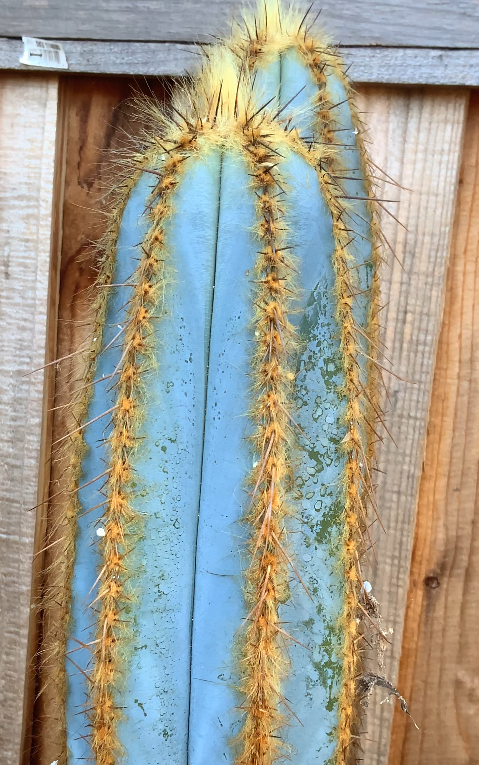

Conservation status
- Near Threatened (IUCN 3.1)

Scientific classification
- Kingdom: Plantae
- Clade: Tracheophytes
- Clade: Angiosperms
- Clade: Eudicots
- Order: Caryophyllales
- Family: Cactaceae
- Subfamily: Cactoideae
- Genus: Pilosocereus
- Species: P. fulvilanatus

Binomial name
- Pilosocereus fulvilanatus (Buining & Brederoo) F.Ritter

= Pilosocereus fulvilanatus =

Species of cactus

Pilosocereus fulvilanatus is a species of plant in the family Cactaceae. It is endemic to Brazil. Its natural habitats are subtropical or tropical dry forests, subtropical or tropical dry shrubland, and rocky areas. It is threatened by habitat loss. In Brazil, Pilosocereus fulvilanatus is locally known as “Jamacaru Cabeludo”
