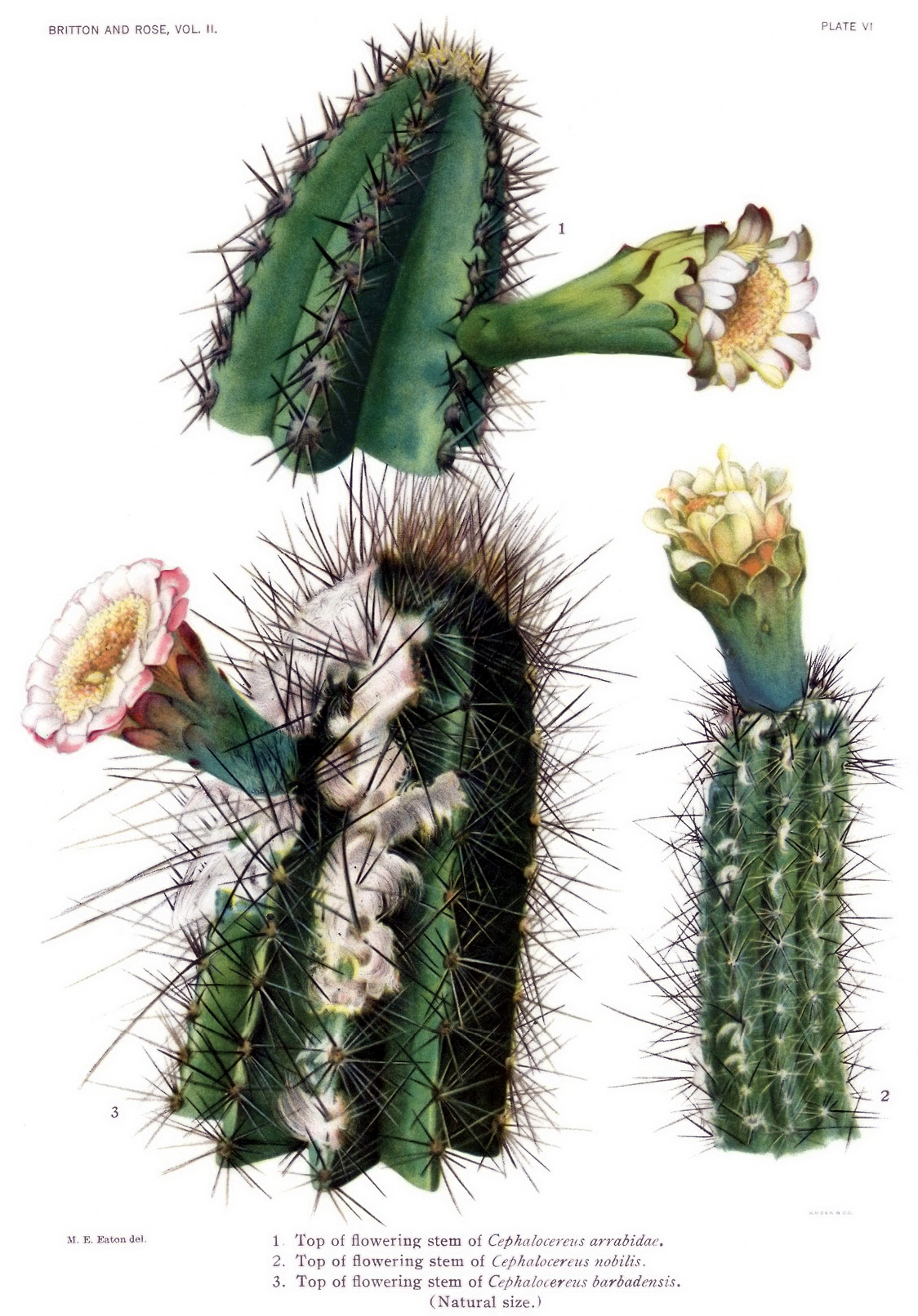
- Specimen at top

Conservation status
- Near Threatened (IUCN 3.1)

Scientific classification
- Kingdom: Plantae
- Clade: Tracheophytes
- Clade: Angiosperms
- Clade: Eudicots
- Order: Caryophyllales
- Family: Cactaceae
- Subfamily: Cactoideae
- Genus: Pilosocereus
- Species: P. arrabidae

Binomial name
- Pilosocereus arrabidae (Lem.) Byles & G.D.Rowley

= Pilosocereus arrabidae =

Species of cactus

Pilosocereus arrabidae is a species of plant in the family Cactaceae. It is endemic to Brazil. Its natural habitats are rocky shores and sandy shores. It is threatened by habitat loss.
