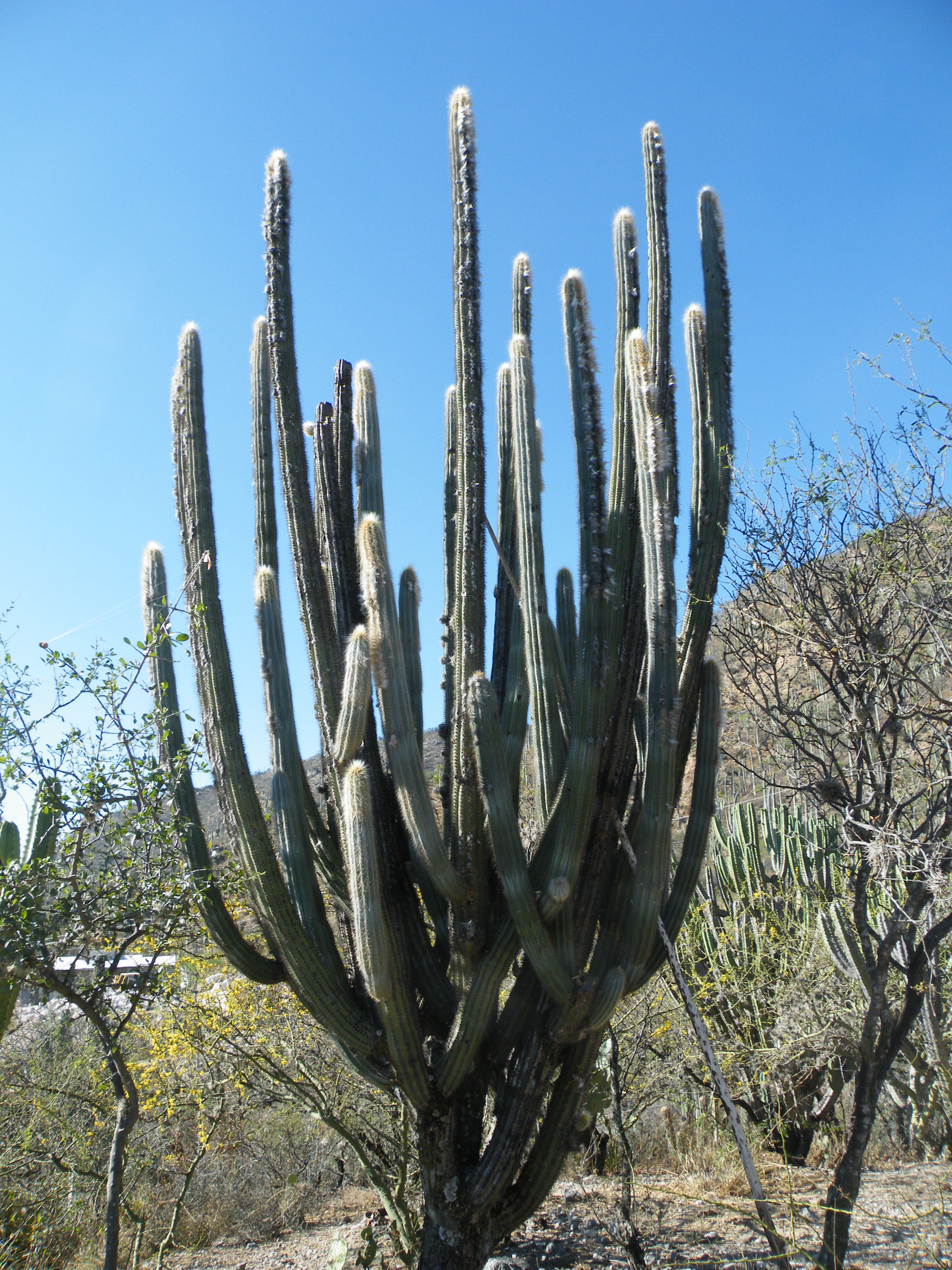

Scientific classification
- Kingdom: Plantae
- Clade: Tracheophytes
- Clade: Angiosperms
- Clade: Eudicots
- Order: Caryophyllales
- Family: Cactaceae
- Subfamily: Cactoideae
- Genus: Pilosocereus
- Species: P. chrysacanthus

Binomial name
- Pilosocereus chrysacanthus (F.A.C.Weber ex K.Schum.) Byles & G.D.Rowley 1957

= Pilosocereus chrysacanthus =

Species of cactus

Pilosocereus chrysacanthus is a species of Pilosocereus found in Mexico to Honduras
