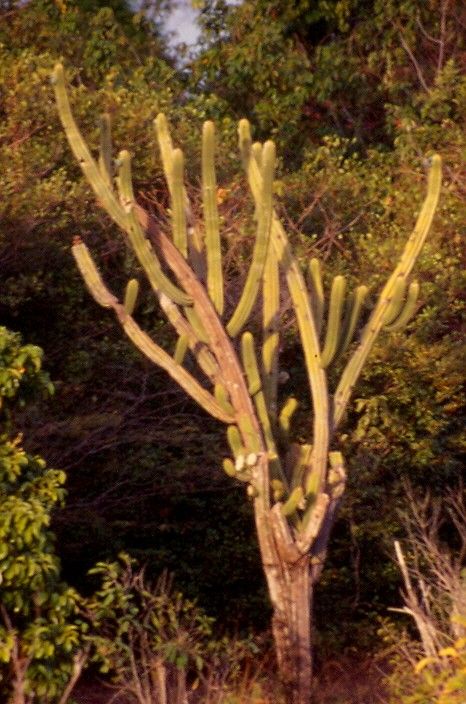
- Habitus of Pilosocereus catingicola subsp. salvadorensis (Werderm.) Zappi
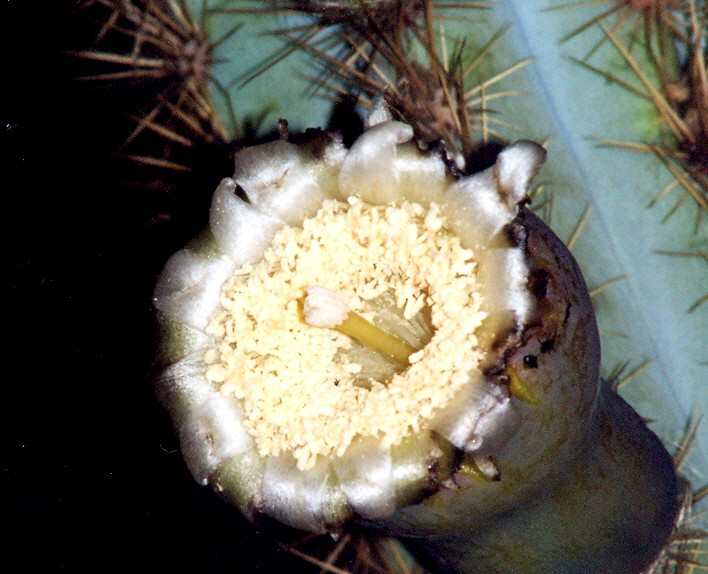
- Flower in detail

Conservation status
- Least Concern (IUCN 3.1)

Scientific classification
- Kingdom: Plantae
- Clade: Embryophytes
- Clade: Tracheophytes
- Clade: Spermatophytes
- Clade: Angiosperms
- Clade: Eudicots
- Order: Caryophyllales
- Family: Cactaceae
- Subfamily: Cactoideae
- Genus: Pilosocereus
- Species: P. catingicola

Binomial name
- Pilosocereus catingicola (Gürke) Byles & G.D. Rowley 1957

= Pilosocereus catingicola =

Species of cactus

Pilosocereus catingicola is a flowering plant in the family Cactaceae that is endemic in northeastern Brazilian states of Rio Grande do Norte, Pernambuco, Alagoas, Sergipe, Paraíba, Bahia.

The plant is bat-pollinated, by Goldman's nectar bat.
