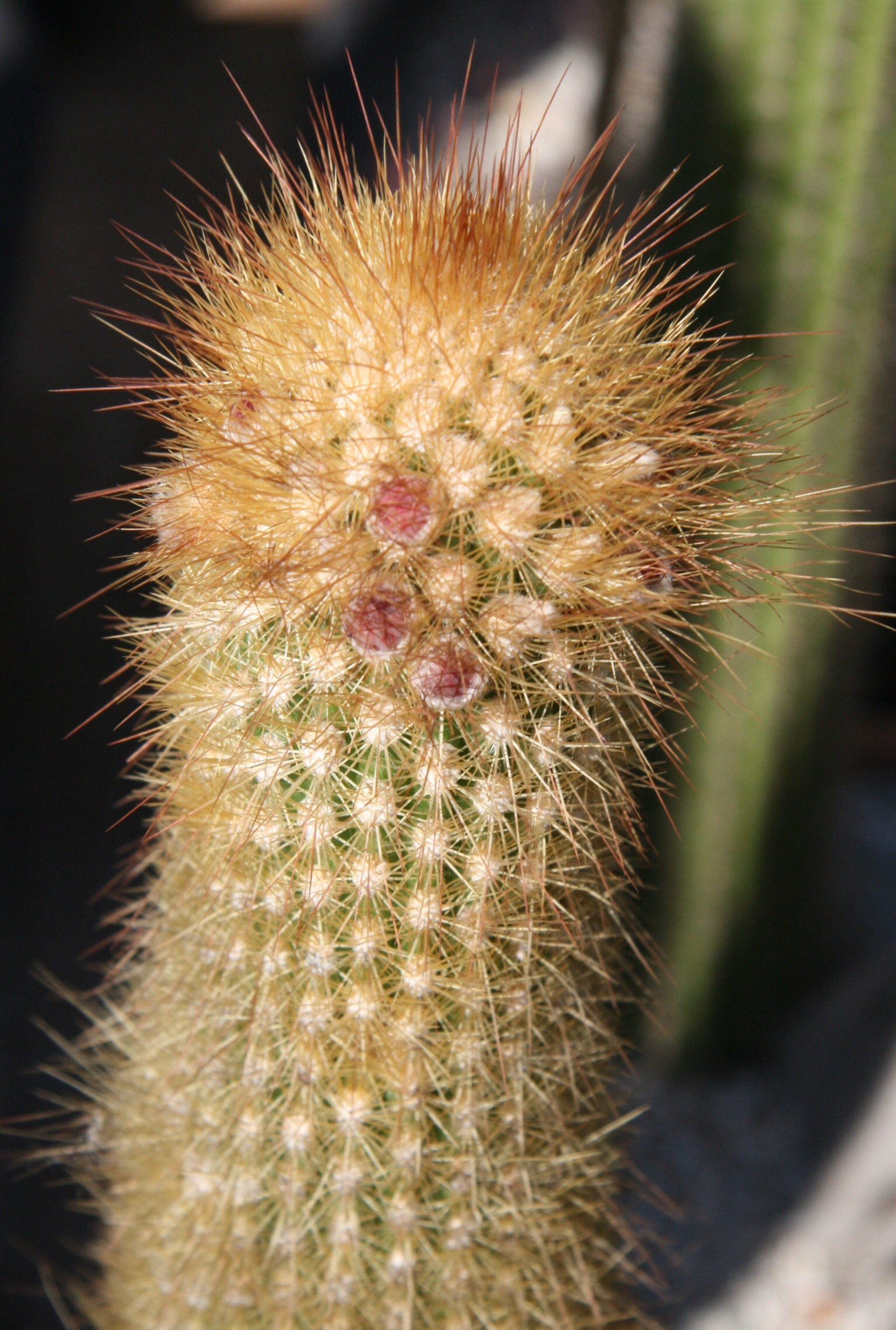

Conservation status
- Vulnerable (IUCN 3.1)

Scientific classification
- Kingdom: Plantae
- Clade: Tracheophytes
- Clade: Angiosperms
- Clade: Eudicots
- Order: Caryophyllales
- Family: Cactaceae
- Subfamily: Cactoideae
- Genus: Pilosocereus
- Species: P. aureispinus

Binomial name
- Pilosocereus aureispinus (Buining & Brederoo) F.Ritter

= Pilosocereus aureispinus =

Species of cactus

Pilosocereus aureispinus is a species of plant in the family Cactaceae, endemic to Brazil. Its natural habitats include dry savanna and rocky areas. The species is currently threatened by habitat loss.
