= Pilosocereus excelsus =

Scientific classification
- Kingdom: Plantae
- Clade: Tracheophytes
- Clade: Angiosperms
- Clade: Eudicots
- Order: Caryophyllales
- Family: Cactaceae
- Subfamily: Cactoideae
- Genus: Pilosocereus
- Species: P. excelsus

Binomial name
- Pilosocereus excelsus Hoxey & Gdaniec

Species of cactus

Pilosocereus excelsus is a species of flowering plant in the cactus family Cactaceae, endemic to the east of the Dominican Republic. It was first described in 2021, when it was separated from Pilosocereus polygonus.

== Description ==
Plants of Pilosocereus excelsus have a tree-like habit, reaching at least 10 m (33 ft) in height when mature, with a woody trunk up to 2 m (7 ft). Fewer than 10 principal branches emerge from the primary stem. With age, these become woody; large specimens develop more than 100 secondary branches. The blue-green stems are 8–12 cm (3–5 in) across and have about 8 ribs. The areoles are about 5 mm (0.2 in) across and about 12 mm (0.5 in) apart. Areoles on young branches have tufts of white hairs 10–15 mm (0.4–0.6 in) long that are lost with age. Non-flowering areoles have 15–20 spines, each about 10–15 mm (0.4–0.6 in) long, occasionally up to 20 mm (0.8 in) long. Flowering areoles have shorter spines, usually less than 10 mm (0.4 in) long.

The flowers appear at night and have a smell described as "musty". Excluding the style, they are about 65 mm (2.6 in) long and about 45 mm (1.8 in) across. The white style is 65 mm (2.6 in) long. The outer perianth segments are rounded and fleshy, about 10 mm (0.4 in) long and wide. There are about 16 white inner perianth segments that are about 15 mm (0.6 in) long and 8 mm (0.3 in) wide. The fruit is spherical, about 40 mm (1.6 in) across, with red pulp and shiny black seeds.

== Taxonomy ==
Pilosocereus excelsus was first described in 2021. The specific epithet excelsus refers to the height of this species. Previously, all the species of Pilosocereus found on the island of Hispaniola were treated as Pilosocereus polygonus. P. excelsus was distinguished from P. polygonus by its greater height when mature. Its stems are thicker (greater than 8 cm (3.1 in) across). Its spines are shorter (generally about 10 mm (0.4 in) long rather than 15–30 mm (0.6–1.2 in) long). Its areoles also have somewhat shorter tufts of hairs than P. polygonus. P. excelsus has also been considered to fall within the normal variability of P. polygonus, and so not a distinct species.

== Distribution and habitat ==
Pilosocereus excelsus is endemic to the Dominican Republic, where it occurs only in the south-east. It has been found in two offshore islands, Catalina Island and Saona Island, as well as on the main island of Hispaniola. Plants are usually found close to the coast at elevations up to 100 m (330 ft). When growing in seasonally dry woodland, specimens are generally very tall, allowing branches to emerge from other vegetation.
