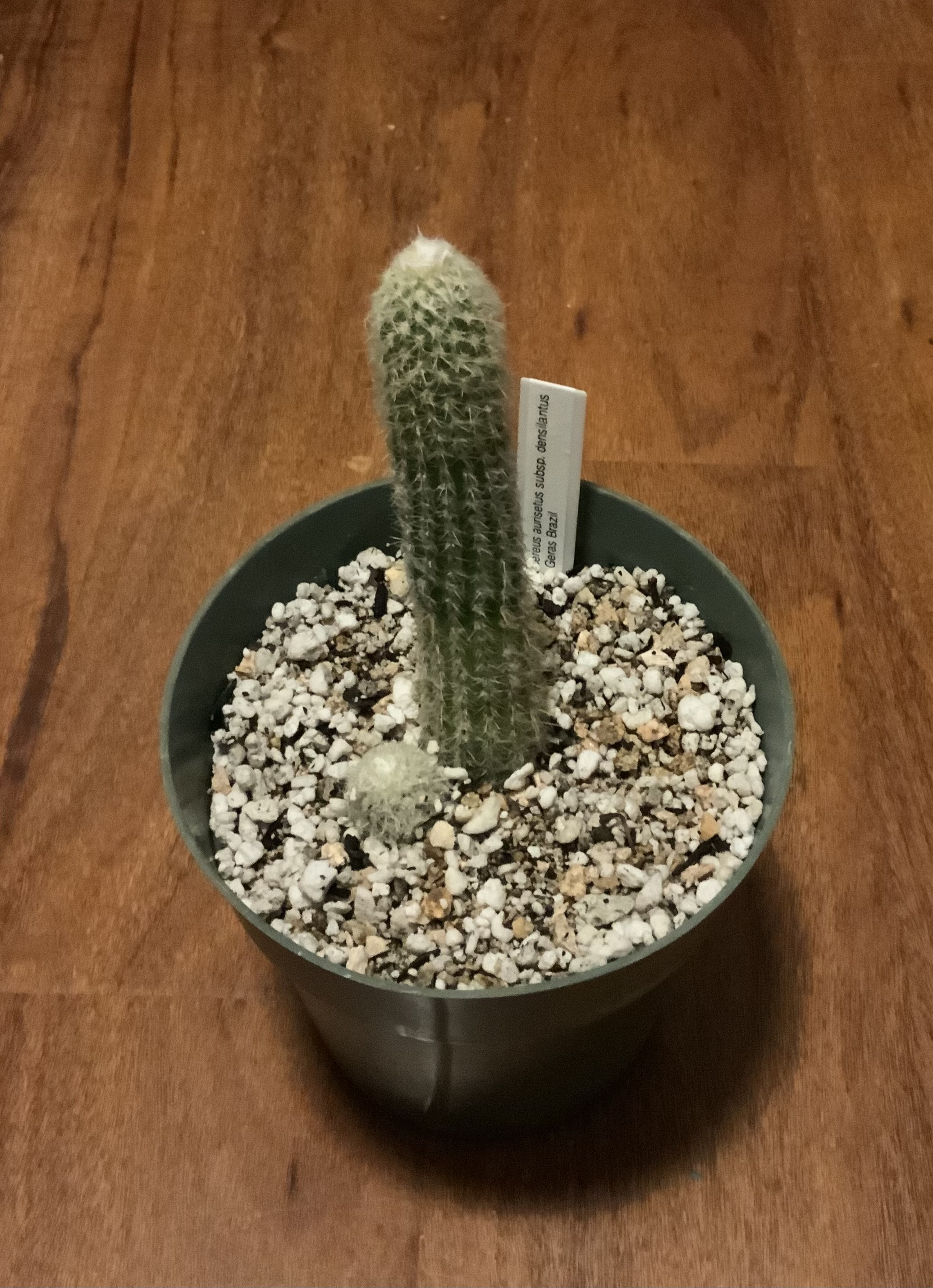

Conservation status
- Least Concern (IUCN 3.1)

Scientific classification
- Kingdom: Plantae
- Clade: Tracheophytes
- Clade: Angiosperms
- Clade: Eudicots
- Order: Caryophyllales
- Family: Cactaceae
- Subfamily: Cactoideae
- Genus: Pilosocereus
- Species: P. aurisetus

Binomial name
- Pilosocereus aurisetus Byles & G.D.Rowley (1957)

= Pilosocereus aurisetus =

Species of cactus

Pilosocereus auristetus is a species of cactus native to Minas Gerais, Brazil and was first described in 1957.

== Description ==
Pilosocereus aurisetus is a columnar cactus that gets no taller than 3 feet. White wool grows out of the areoles and the spines when dense create a yellow hue. Uniformly spaced ribs and this cactus does not branch though it can create new plants by suckering.

== Habitat ==
Pilosocereus aurisetus is native to Minas Gerais and grows at about 650 M to at most 1300 M above sea level in quartzitic rock outcrops in a savannah type habitat.
