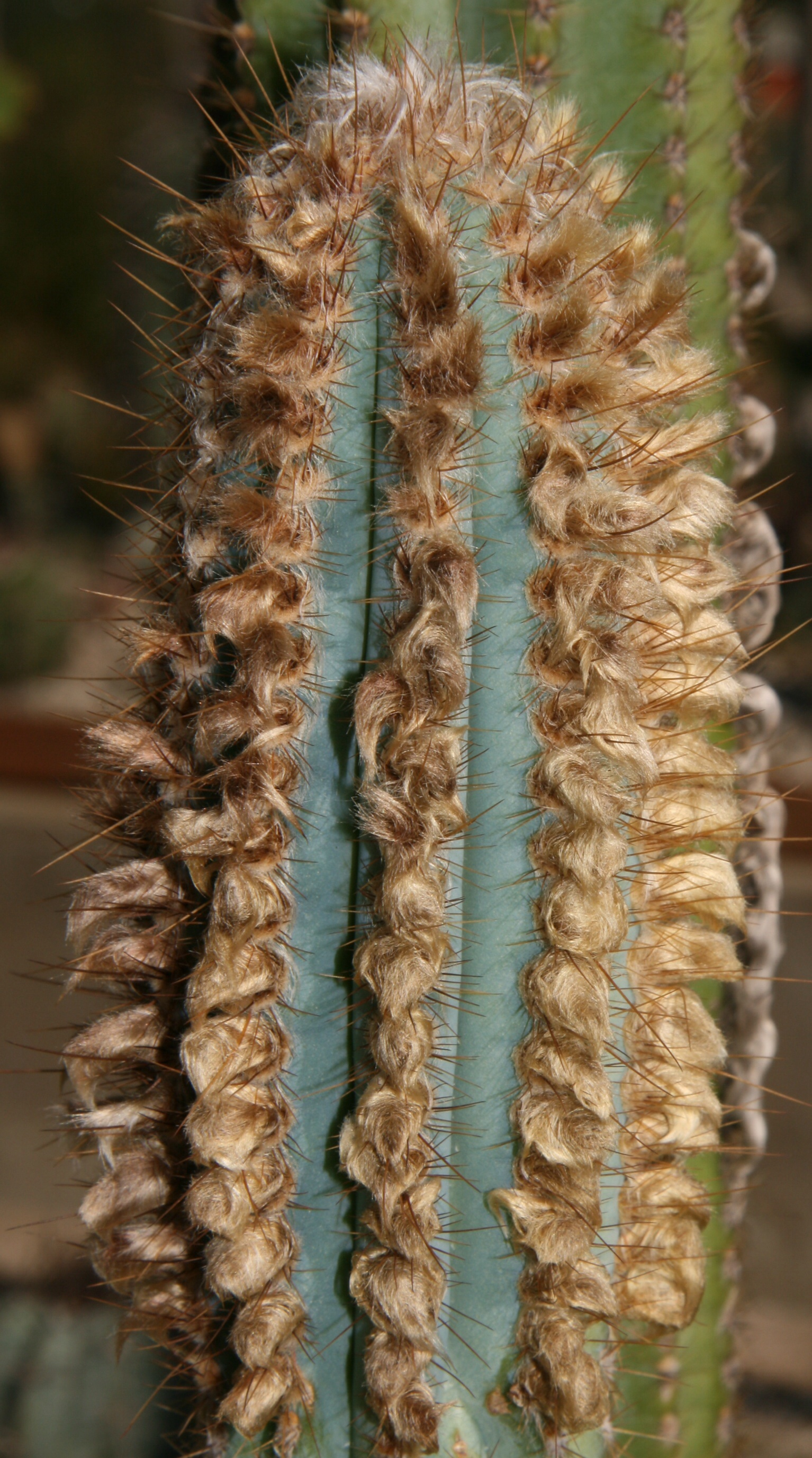

Scientific classification
- Kingdom: Plantae
- Clade: Tracheophytes
- Clade: Angiosperms
- Clade: Eudicots
- Order: Caryophyllales
- Family: Cactaceae
- Subfamily: Cactoideae
- Genus: Pilosocereus
- Species: P. machrisii

Binomial name
- Pilosocereus machrisii (E.Y.Dawson) Backeb. 1960

= Pilosocereus machrisii =

Species of plant

Pilosocereus machrisii is a species of Pilosocereus found in from West Bahia to Minas Gerais, Brazil. The cricumscription of this species is not well agreed upon by botanists.
