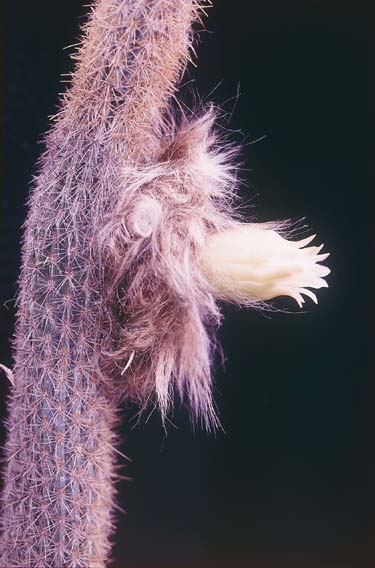

Scientific classification
- Kingdom: Plantae
- Clade: Tracheophytes
- Clade: Angiosperms
- Clade: Eudicots
- Order: Caryophyllales
- Family: Cactaceae
- Subfamily: Cactoideae
- Genus: Pilosocereus
- Species: P. densiareolatus

Binomial name
- Pilosocereus densiareolatus F.Ritter

Synonyms
- Pseudopilocereus densiareolatus (F.Ritter) P.V.Heath; Pilosocereus densiareolatus subsp. brunneolanatus P.J.Braun & Esteves

= Pilosocereus densiareolatus =

Species of cactus

Pilosocereus densiareolatus is a species of cactus native to Eastern Brazil.

== Description ==
Pilosocereus densiareolatus is a shrubby cactus growing up to 4–5 m tall. The glaucous to brownish branches are 4–7 cm thick. Each stem has around 18 ribs that are slightly crenate. The brownish areoles are 2-3 mm diameter having white hairs. The aeroles are 2–4 min apart. Each aeroles has 10–12 marginal spines, and 5-8 central spines. A well formed white cephalium is present on mature plants. The tubular flowers are 3.5–4 cm long. The fruit are pale red with white pulp; the seeds are 2 mm long and 1.4 mm wide.

The type locality is at Montes Claros, Minas Gerais.

== Etymology ==
The specific epithet "densiareolatus" refers to the plant's dense aeroles
