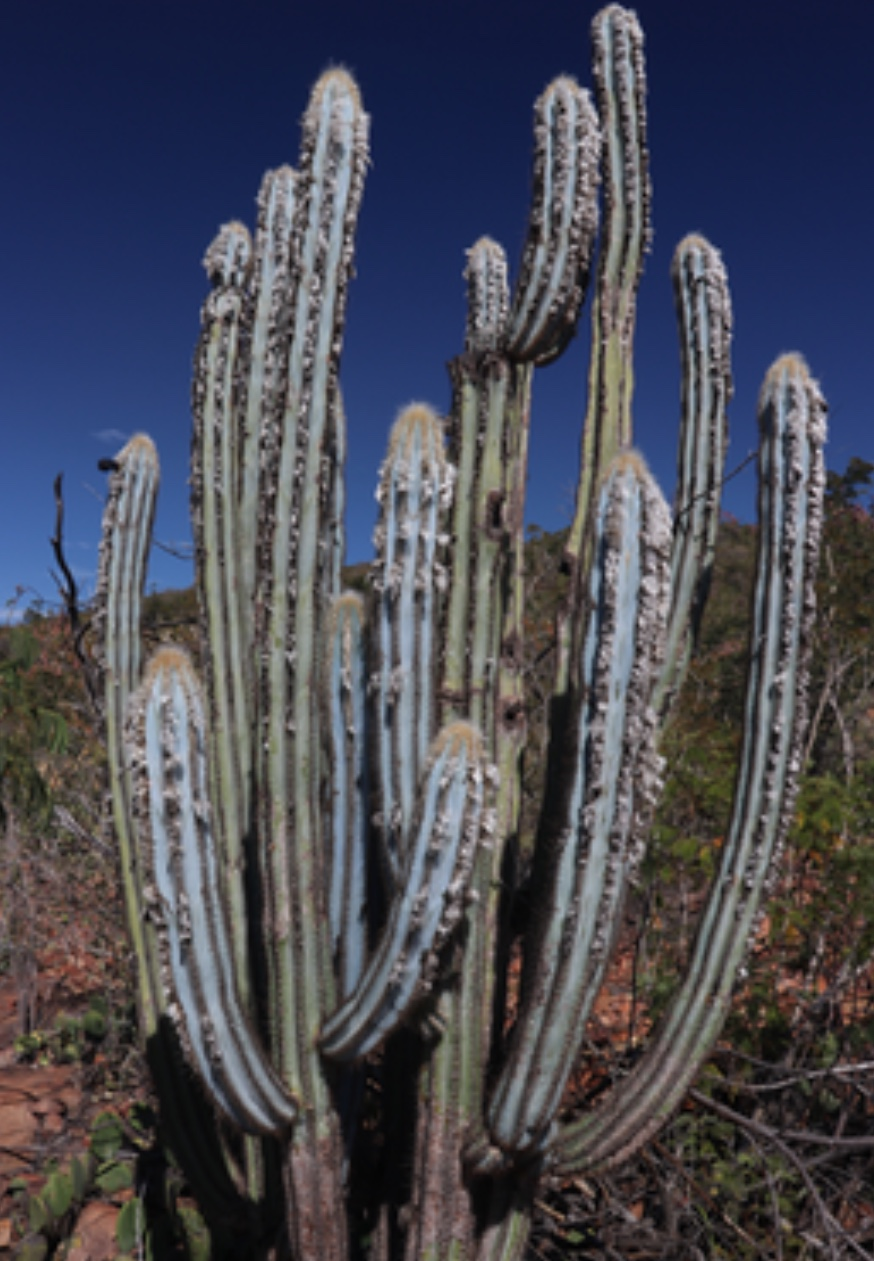

Scientific classification
- Kingdom: Plantae
- Clade: Tracheophytes
- Clade: Angiosperms
- Clade: Eudicots
- Order: Caryophyllales
- Family: Cactaceae
- Subfamily: Cactoideae
- Genus: Pilosocereus
- Species: P. pachycladus

Binomial name
- Pilosocereus pachycladus F.Ritter

Synonyms
- Pseudopilocereus pachycladus (F.Ritter) P.V.Heath

= Pilosocereus pachycladus =

Species of cactus

Pilosocereus pachycladus is a species of flowering plant in the family Cactaceae found in eastern Brazil, and introduced to the Canary Islands.

== Description ==
Pilosocereus pachycladus grows in a tree-like form, reaching a height of up to 30 feet. Its stems are upright, smooth, and range in color from gray-green to blue-green with a glaucous appearance.The stems measure 3 to 6 inches in diameter. Each stem has 5 to 19 ribs, which feature transverse grooves near the tips of the stems. The spines are golden-yellow, turning grayish with age. Each areole has 1 to 12 central spines up to 1 inch long, and 8 to 18 radial spines up to 0.5 inches long. The pseudocephalium varies from specimens. Some do not have any pseudocephalium, while others have a pronounced pseudocephalium. The pseudocephalia also vary in color from white to dark brown. flowers are highly variable, ranging from 2 to 4 inches in length and 1 to 2 inches in diameter. The fruits are depressed-spherical in shape, splitting open on the side to reveal magenta-colored pulp.

== Distribution and Habitat ==
Pilosocereus pachycladus is endemic to Brazil, occurring in the states of Bahia, Minas Gerais, Piauí, Ceará, Rio Grande do Norte, Paraíba, Pernambuco, and Alagoas. It grows at elevations ranging from 50 to 1,550 meters. This species is found in the central-southern Cattinga region on quartzite outcrops and within the scrub vegetation associated with Campos Rupestres (rocky highland grasslands). It can also be found growing alongside other woody vegetation in the Cattinga, in rocky areas within and surrounding the Chapada Diamantina, and on sandy or rocky substrates.

== Taxonomy ==
The taxonomy of Pilosocereus pachycladus is often debated. Various species are either segregated from or subsumed under Pilosocereus pachycladus depending on the classification.

=== Pilosocereus azureus ===
Under some classifications, this species is kept separate from pachycladus on the basis of it lacking a pseudocephalium. As of November 2026, POWO considers Pilosocereus azureus to be synonymous with pachycladus

=== Pilosocereus cenepequei ===
Pilosocereus cenepequei is a name assigned to Pilosocereus pachycladus found in NE Minas Gerais. Some consider it different as the cenepequei consistently has 4-5 ribs compared to pachycladus with up to 19. As of November 2026, POWO considers Pilosocereus cenepequei to be synonymous with Pilosocereus pachycladus subsp. pachycladus

== Gallery ==
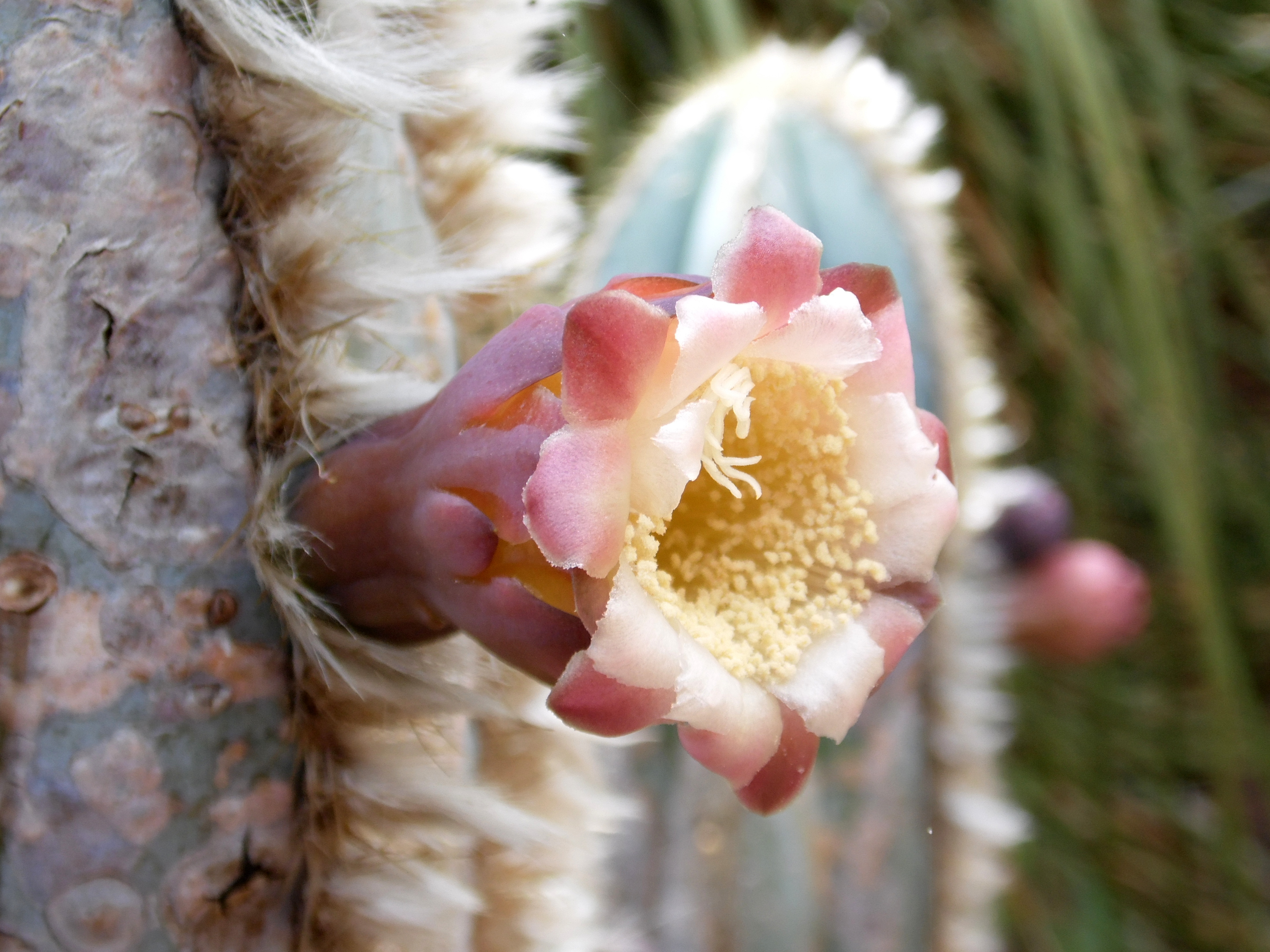
Flowers

Pilosocereus azureus

Fruit

Pilosocereus pachycladus v. viridis

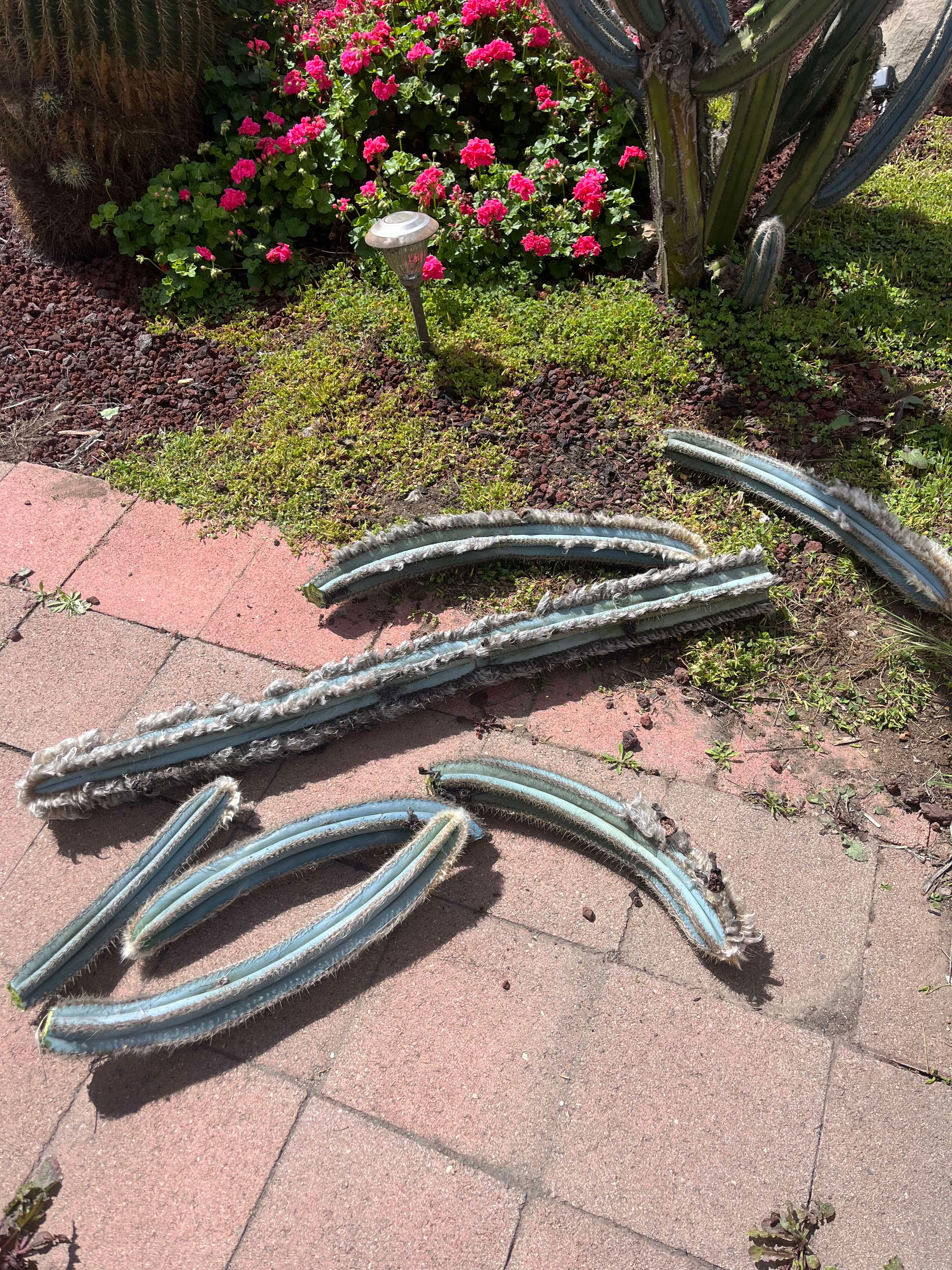

== Subspecies ==
- Pilosocereus pachycladus subsp. pachycladus
- Pilosocereus pachycladus subsp. pernambucoensis (F.Ritter) Zappi
- Pilosocereus pachycladus subsp. vridis N.P.Taylor & Albuq.-Lima
