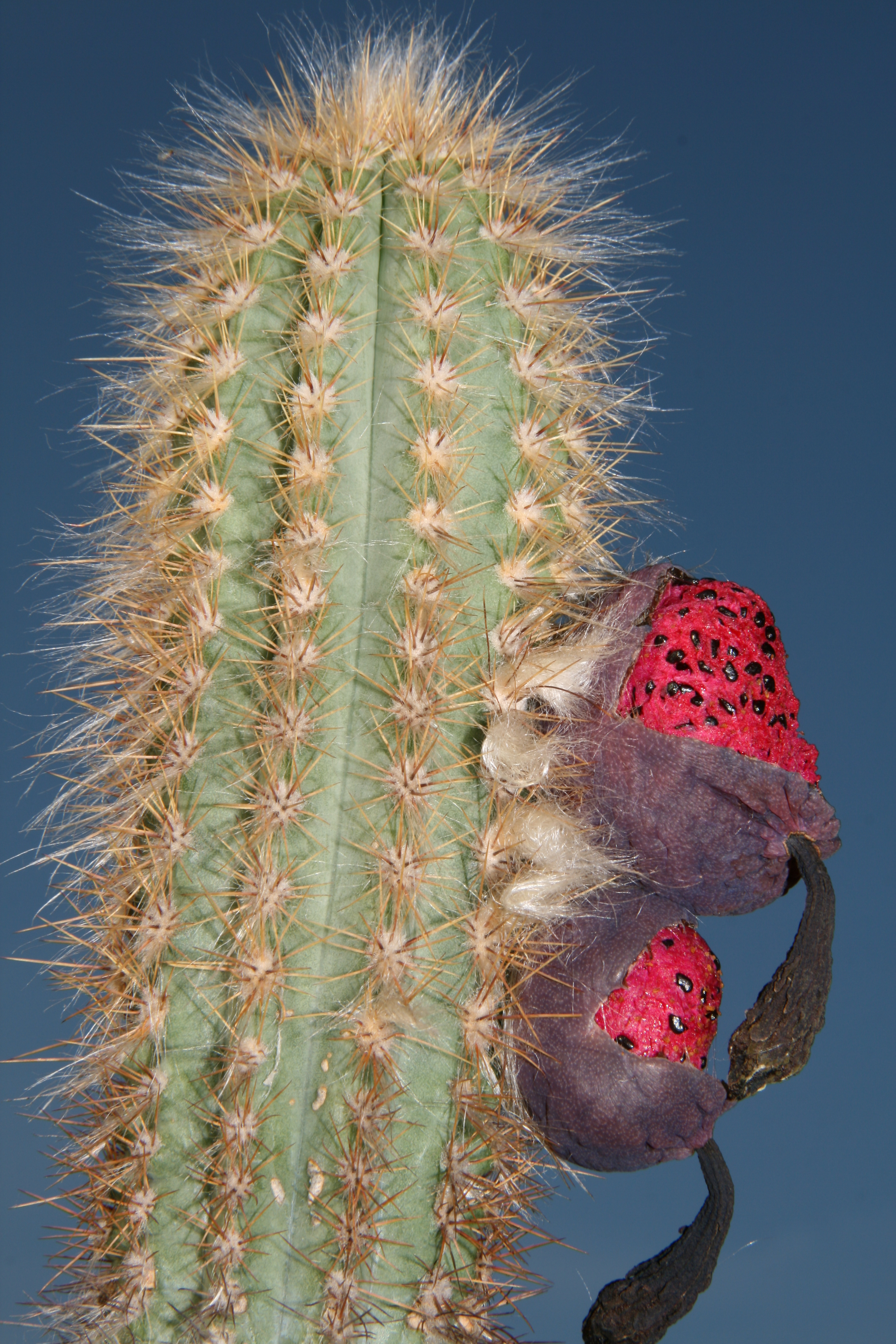

Scientific classification
- Kingdom: Plantae
- Clade: Tracheophytes
- Clade: Angiosperms
- Clade: Eudicots
- Order: Caryophyllales
- Family: Cactaceae
- Subfamily: Cactoideae
- Genus: Pilosocereus
- Species: P. goianus

Binomial name
- Pilosocereus goianus P.J.Braun & Esteves

= Pilosocereus goianus =

Species of cactus

Pilosocereus goianus is a species of cactus native to Goiás.

== Description ==
Pilosocereus goianus is shrubby cactus that branches at the base. Sometimes, this species forms a short trunk. The branches form a candelabra-like shape and reaches the height of up to 2.8 m. The grayish-green shoots have a diameter of 6.5 to 11 centimeters and 13 to 15 low ribs. The areoles lightly felted, becoming dark gray as they age. The areoles are spaced 6 to 11 mm apart. Each areole has 26 to 40 needle-like spines. There 12 to 16 central spines and 30 radial spines that vary considerably in length. The cephalic areoles are whitish, scattered across the branches.

The bell shaped flowers are up to 4.8 cm long and has a diameter of 3 centimeters. The flower tube is brown and the perianth segments are white. The wrinkled fruits are greenish to a dark red. They have a diameter of 4.2 cm by 3.2 cm. The fruits contain dark pink flesh.

== Taxonomy and etymology ==
Pilosocereus goianus was first described in 2002 by Pierre J Braun and Eddie Esteves. Over time, some authorities have synonymized this species with Pilosocereus machrisii and Pilosocereus albisummus. The specific epithet "goianus" refer to the occurrence of this species in the Brazilian state of Goiás.
