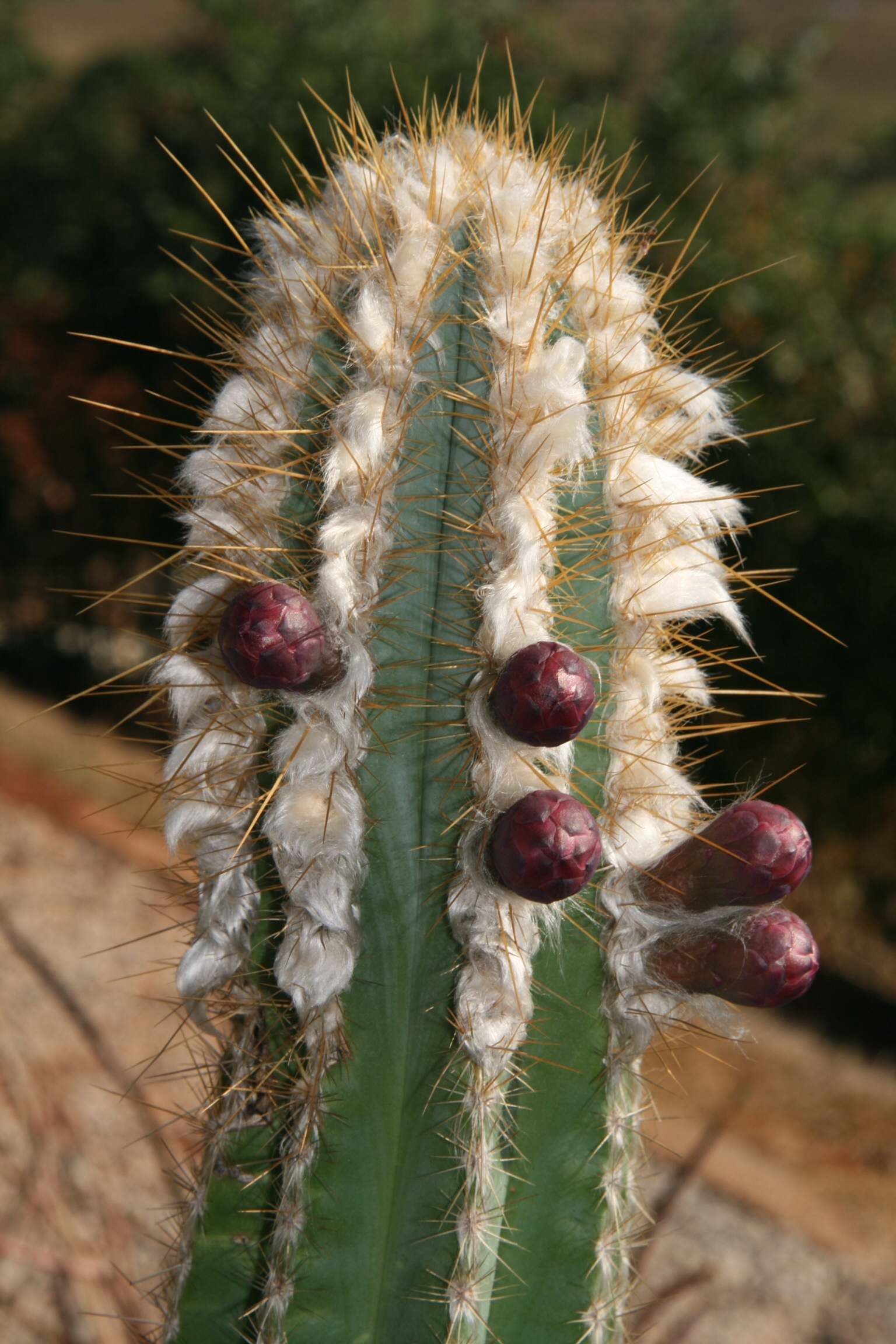

Conservation status
- Data Deficient (IUCN 3.1)

Scientific classification
- Kingdom: Plantae
- Clade: Tracheophytes
- Clade: Angiosperms
- Clade: Eudicots
- Order: Caryophyllales
- Family: Cactaceae
- Subfamily: Cactoideae
- Genus: Pilosocereus
- Species: P. albisummus

Binomial name
- Pilosocereus albisummus P.J. Braun & Esteves Pereira 1987

Synonyms
- Pilosocereus pachycladus subsp. albisummus (P.J.Braun & Esteves) Guiggi 2020

= Pilosocereus albisummus =

Species of cactus

Pilosocereus albisummus is a species of Pilosocereus found in Minas Gerais, Brazil.

== Description ==
Pilosocereus albisummus is a shrub or tree-like cactus with a defined trunk and upright, gray-green shoots that can grow up to 8.5 centimetres (3.3 in) in diameter and reach a height of 2.8 metres (9 ft 2 in) with 6 to 12 ribs and light yellow or reddish thorns that turn gray or black. The 3 to 7 central spines are 5 to 10 millimeters long and can curve inwards, while the 11 to 13 radial spines are 5 to 7 millimeters long when spread out. The flowering part of the shoots is distinctive, with grayish to brownish hairs up to 2.2 centimetres (0.87 in) long and thorns up to 4.1 centimetres (1.6 in) long on the flowering areoles.

The flowers of Pilosocereus albisummus are silver-white to slightly purple, measuring up to 4.3 centimetres (1.7 in) long and 3.5 centimetres (1.4 in) in diameter. Its spherical fruits are depressed, up to 2.5 centimetres (0.98 in) long, and open with a side slit, containing magenta-colored flesh.

== Distribution ==
Pilosocereus albisummus is distributed in the west of the Brazilian state of Minas Gerais.

== Taxonomy ==
The plant was first described in 1987 by Pierre Josef Braun and Eddie Esteves Pereira. The specific epithet albisummus means 'with white tips'. A nomenclature synonym is Pilosocereus pachycladus subsp. albisummus (P.J.Braun & Esteves) Guiggi (2020). Pilosocereus estevesii and Pilosocereus goianus were previously considered synonyms of Pilosocereus albisummus.
