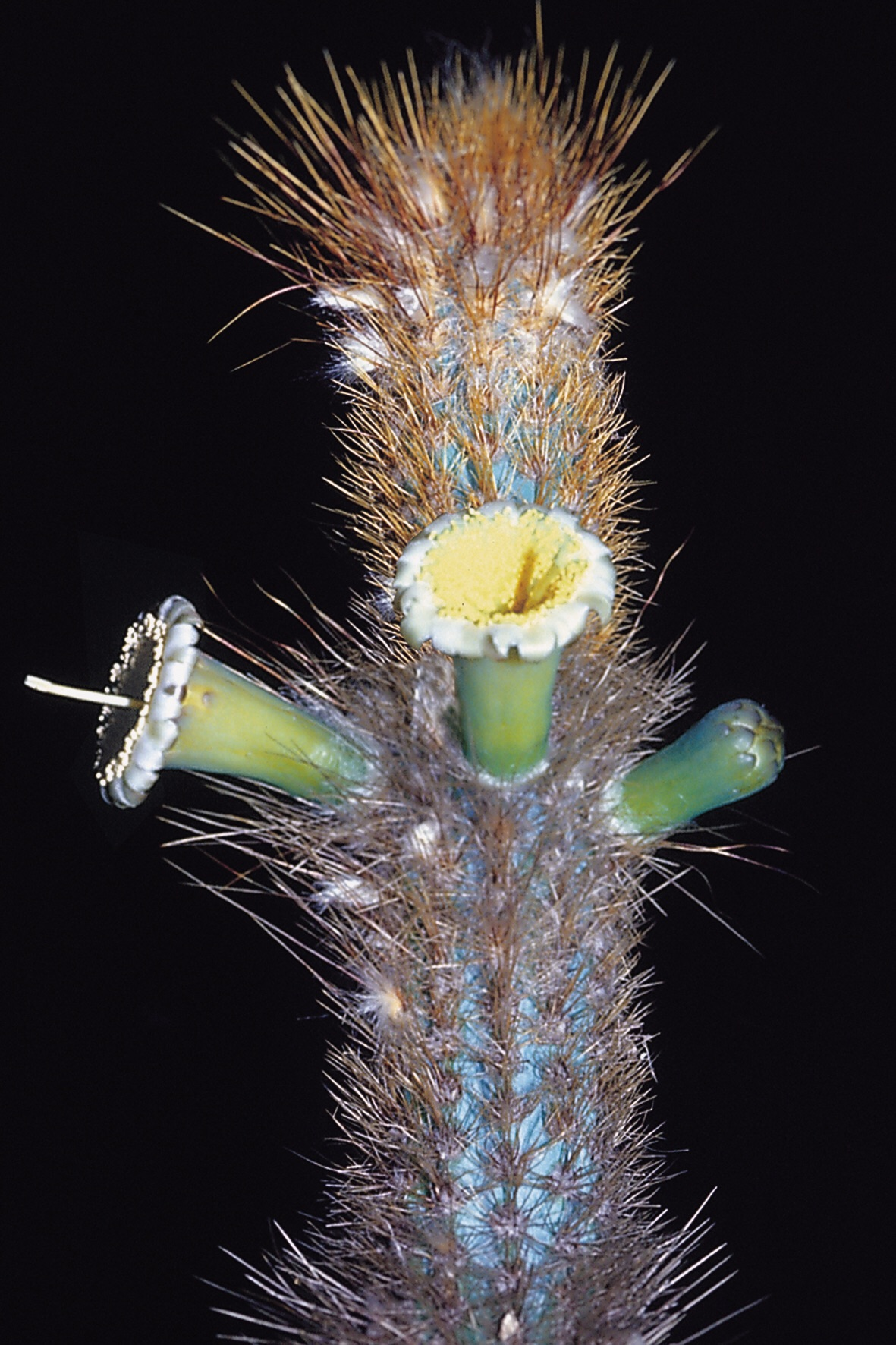

Scientific classification
- Kingdom: Plantae
- Clade: Tracheophytes
- Clade: Angiosperms
- Clade: Eudicots
- Order: Caryophyllales
- Family: Cactaceae
- Subfamily: Cactoideae
- Genus: Pilosocereus
- Species: P. estevesii

Binomial name
- Pilosocereus estevesii P.J. Braun

= Pilosocereus estevesii =

Species of cactus

Pilosocereus estevesii is a species of cactus native to Bahia

== Description ==
Pilosocereus estevesii is a tree-like cactus, often branching in a candelabra-like form. P. estevesii reaches the height of up to 3.2 meters. The stems are upright. The greenish-blue to greenish-gray shoots have a diameter of 5.5 to 6.5 cm. The stems have 10 to 23 ribs, slightly depressed between the circular to oval areoles. The areoles are spaced 1.3 cm apart. The straight, needle-like, spines are pale yellow to brownish or grayish. On each areoles, there are 1 to 7 central spines and 13 to 17 radial spines. The mature stems are very distinct. The areoles in this area are covered with brownish to grayish bristles up to 4.7 centimeters long. The funnel-shaped, whitish flowers are up to 4.7 cm long. The fruit are spherical to globular, and pink in color. They have a diameter of up to 4.7 centimeters. They split open laterally when ripe, and contain dark pink flesh.

== Taxonomy ==
Pilosocereus estevesii was first published in 1999 by Pierre J. Braun. It is named after the Brazilian botanist Eddie Esteves. It is purported to be extinct in the wild and has been lumped with Pilosocereus machrisii and Pilosocereus albisummus.
