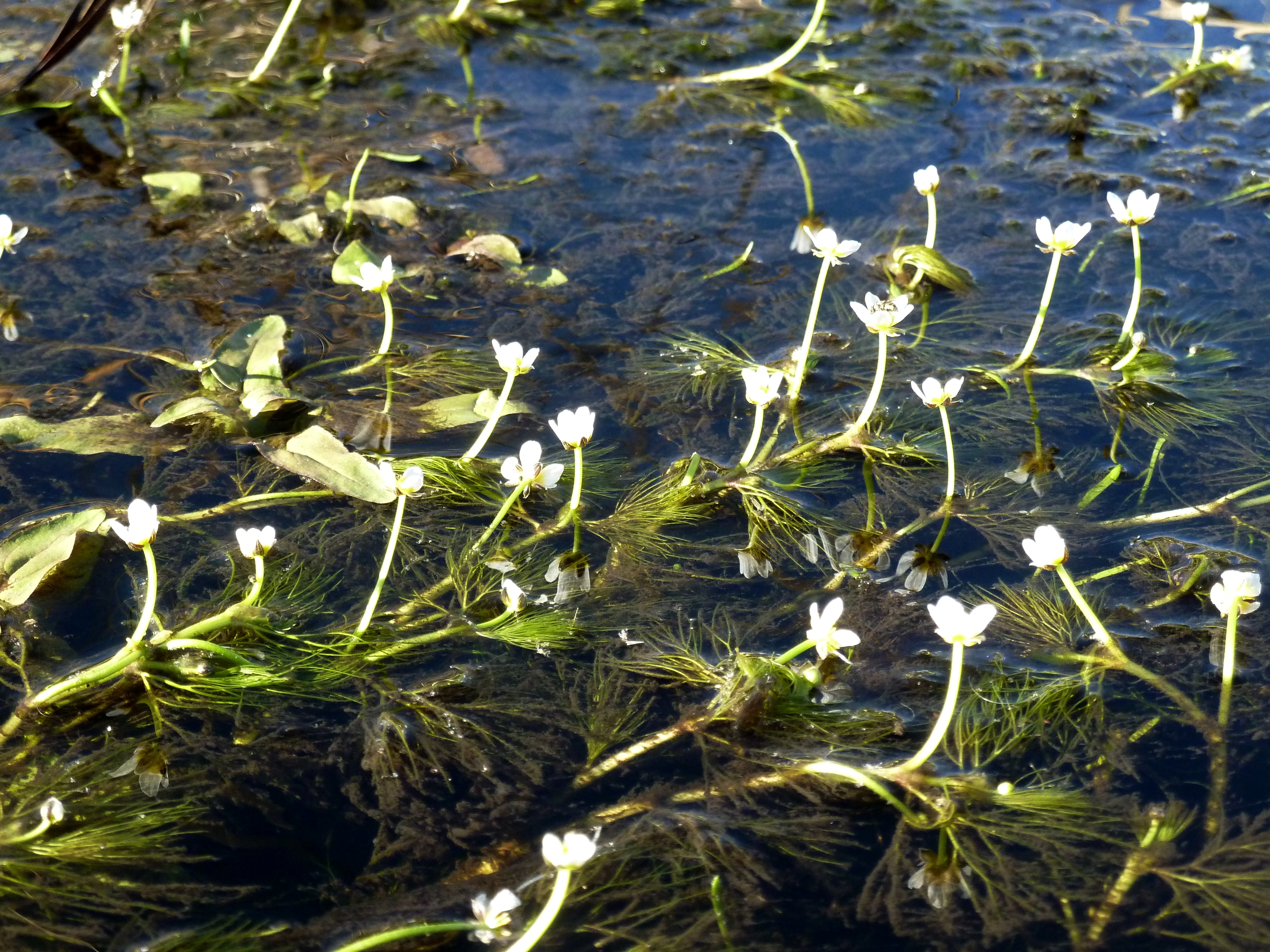

Scientific classification
- Kingdom: Plantae
- Clade: Tracheophytes
- Clade: Angiosperms
- Clade: Eudicots
- Order: Ranunculales
- Family: Ranunculaceae
- Genus: Ranunculus
- Species: R. rionii

Binomial name
- Ranunculus rionii Lagger, 1848

Synonyms
- Batrachium rionii; Batrachium trichophyllum rionii; Ranunculus flaccidus rionii

= Ranunculus rionii =

Species of buttercup

Ranunculus rionii is a species of water crowfoot in the buttercup genus. It occurs from Europe to western China, and in North Africa, western North America and South Africa. The white, five-petaled flowers are arranged in cymes. The deciduous, tripinnate foliage has an opposite arrangement.
