= Rosa komarovii =

Scientific classification
- Kingdom: Plantae
- Clade: Tracheophytes
- Clade: Angiosperms
- Clade: Eudicots
- Clade: Rosids
- Order: Rosales
- Family: Rosaceae
- Genus: Rosa
- Species: R. komarovii

Binomial name
- Rosa komarovii Sosn.

Species of rose

Rosa komarovii is a species of rose that was described by Dmitrii Ivanovich Sosnowsky. Rosa komarovii is part of the genus Roses, and the family Rosaceae.
