= Discocactus piscibarbarus =

Scientific classification
- Kingdom: Plantae
- Clade: Tracheophytes
- Clade: Angiosperms
- Clade: Eudicots
- Order: Caryophyllales
- Family: Cactaceae
- Subfamily: Cactoideae
- Genus: Discocactus
- Species: D. piscibarbarus

Binomial name
- Discocactus piscibarbarus N.P.Taylor & Olsthoorn, 2023

Species of cactus

Discocactus piscibarbarus is a species of succulent flowering plant in the genus Discocactus, within the family Cactaceae. It is endemic to the state of Minas Gerais in southeastern Brazil.

== Description ==
Discocactus piscibarbarus is a species of small, solitary cactus with a discoid growth form. The stems measure up to 5 cm tall (not counting the cephalium) and 10 to 14 cm in diameter. The epidermis is dark green, and the roots are branched.

This species has 11 to 18 short, rounded ribs with sinuate grooves between them. The ribs are 1.8 to 2.5 cm wide, and are more or less divided into tubercles. On the tubercles are oval areoles, which measure up to 6 mm in length and 4 mm in width and are separated by 1.2 to 2.2 cm. They have a white, velvety covering when young; this is lost with age.

The spines are initially black. They measure 1.5 to 2.5 cm in length and up to 1 mm in width. They are very narrow and recurved, and do not remain close to the stem. Often, this species has 1 central spine (which may be absent) and 5 to 11 radial spines.

At the apex of adult plants is a woolly structure known as a cephalium, which measures up to 4 cm tall and 4.5 to 6 cm in diameter. It is made up of white wool and flexible, black, exserted spines measuring up to 4 cm in length. The cephalium functions to protect the sensitive apex of the plant from intense ultraviolet radiation as well as the occasional low temperature. It is also believed to attract pollinatiors - it is often very showy even before the flowers develop.

The flowers, which may develop solitarily or in small groups, are white, sweet-scented, and funnel-shaped. They develop from the edges of the cephalium, open at night, and are pollinated by moths. They measure up to 7 cm in length and approximately 5.5 cm in diameter. The pericarpel has no trichomes and measures approximately 6 mm in length and 4 mm in width. The floral tube measures up to 6.5 cm in length and 0.4 to 0.6 cm in diameter, gradually widens, is red-brown on the outside of the lower part and white on the upper part, and with light green-brown linear scales covering the upper two-thirds. The linear tepals are very numerous; they are white in color, and measure approximately 2.5 cm in length and 0.4 cm in width. The stamens appear inserted in the upper half.

The fruits are white in color with a reddish apex. They are club-shaped, and measure up to 3 cm in length. When mature, they split open lengthwise, and retain the remaining floral remnants. They measure up to 3.5 cm in length and approximately 0.5 cm in width. Inside the fruits, the seeds are shiny, black, and slightly widened towards the hilum. They measure approximately 1.8 mm in length and 1.5 mm in width, and the periclinal walls of the testa cells appear strongly convex.

== Distribution and habitat ==
This species is native to the state of Minas Gerais in southeastern Brazil. It is found primarily in the seasonally-dry tropical biome.

Normally, it grows on iron-rich, gravelly soils known locally as "canga"; it also grows on quartz substrates.

== Taxonomy ==
Discocactus piscibarbarus was described by the botanists Nigel Paul Taylor and Gerardus Olsthoorn, and published for the first time in the scientific journal Bradleya 41: 134 26: 2 in 2023.

Etymology

- Discocactus: the genus name is derived from the Greek words diskos (meaning "disc") and kaktos (meaning "thistle" or "spiny plant"), referring to the flat, disc-shaped appearance of many species in this genus.
- piscibarbarus: the specific epithet is derived from the Latin words piscis (meaning "fish") and barbarus (meaning "wild", "foreign", or "barbarian").

== Conservation status ==
The primary threat facing this species is habitat destruction from iron mining, given that it normally grows on iron-rich substrates.

== Cultivation ==
Discocactus piscibarbarus is rarely cultivated as an ornamental. It may be propagated by seed or cuttings.
