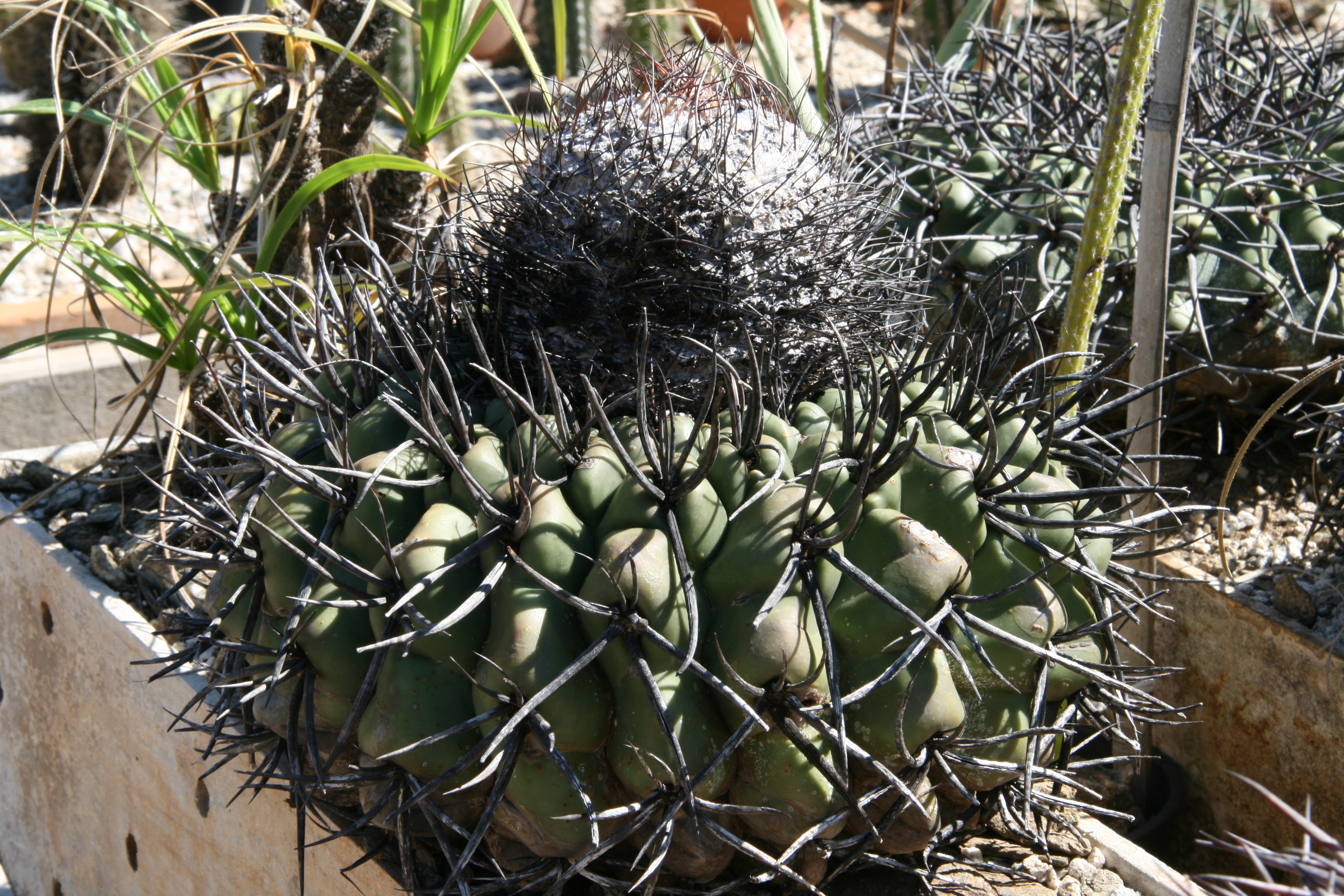

Conservation status
- Endangered (IUCN 3.1)

Scientific classification
- Kingdom: Plantae
- Clade: Tracheophytes
- Clade: Angiosperms
- Clade: Eudicots
- Order: Caryophyllales
- Family: Cactaceae
- Subfamily: Cactoideae
- Genus: Discocactus
- Species: D. diersianus

Binomial name
- Discocactus diersianus Esteves Pereira 1979

= Discocactus diersianus =

Species of tropical cacti

Discocactus diersianus is a species of Discocactus found in Brazil.

== Description ==
Discocactus diersianus is a small, solitary cactus, sometimes form clumps if damaged by fire. The cactus has an olive-green to dark green epidermis and a discoid to flattened globose stem, measuring 10 to 13 cm (3.9 to 5.1 in) tall and 25 to 26 cm (9.8 to 10.2 in) in diameter, supported by branched roots. Its stems feature 13 to 18 distinct, vertically or slightly spirally arranged ribs, each with a V-shaped groove below the areoles and divided into rounded tubercles. Oval, sunken areoles, 1 to 1.2 mm (0.039 to 0.047 in) long and 0.7 mm (0.028 in) wide, are situated on these tubercles, with 4 to 6 per rib, and are the origin of the spines. These spines, typically gray to brownish-gray or blackish-gray with dark brown to black tips, are strongly curved or hooked and rounded or quadrangular in cross-section. They consist of a single, sometimes absent, central spine up to 4 cm (1.6 in) long, accompanied by 4 to 10 radial spines ranging from 6 to 8 cm (2.4 to 3.1 in) in length.

Adult plants develop a distinctive woolly cephalium at their apex, reaching 9 cm (3.5 in) in height and up to 10 cm (3.9 in) in diameter. This structure, composed of white wool and accented by brown to reddish bristles up to 4 to 5 cm (1.6 to 2.0 in) long at its margin, serves to protect the plant's sensitive tip from cold nights and intense UV radiation, and is also thought to attract pollinators due to its conspicuous nature even before flowering. The white, fragrant flowers emerge from the cephalium's edge, opening at night and pollinated by moths. They are tubular to narrowly funnel-shaped, measuring 4 to 6 cm (1.6 to 2.4 in) in length and 3 to 6 cm (1.2 to 2.4 in) in diameter, with white to greenish buds. The pericarpel is naked at the base, with few scales in the upper axils, while the thin, greenish-white floral tube has light green to white scales. The inner perianth segments are about 2.5 cm (0.98 in) long and white, and the outer segments are approximately 3 cm (1.2 in) long, white with a red tip. Inside, the stamens have filaments 0.5 to 3 cm (0.20 to 1.18 in) long and cream-colored anthers 1.4 to 1.8 mm (0.055 to 0.071 in) long, while the style is 1.5 to 2.2 cm (0.59 to 0.87 in) long and bears a 4 to 6 lobed stigma. The ovules, arranged in clusters of 2 to 3, have often branched funicles covered with fine hairs. The fruits are slender and club-shaped, white to cream-colored with a greenish to brownish tint near the apex, measuring about 4.5 cm (1.8 in) long and 0.7 to 0.8 cm (0.28 to 0.31 in) wide. They split longitudinally at maturity, retaining persistent floral remnants, and contain 70 to 80 shiny, oval black seeds, each 1.2 to 1.7 mm (0.047 to 0.067 in) long with a testa featuring more or less elongated tubercles.

=== Subspecies ===
Accepted Subspecies:

Image	Subspecies	Description	Distribution
	Discocactus diersianus subsp. cephaliaciculosus (Buining & Brederoo ex P.J.Braun & Esteves) Guiggi	The cephalothorax is densely covered in spines, which are longer and more prominent than those of the nominate subspecies, resulting in a more spiny appearance.	Brazil (Tocantins)
	Discocactus diersianus subsp. diersianus	The white cephalothorax is adorned with stiff, straight spines, ranging in color from dark red to black, and measuring up to 2 centimeters in length.	Brazil (Goiás)
	Discocactus diersianus subsp. nudicephalus (P.J.Braun & Esteves) Guiggi	This subspecies is distinguished by a cephalothorax that lacks spines, resulting in a smoother, more "naked" appearance than other subspecies.	Brazil (Tocantins)

== Distribution ==
Plants are typically found in seasonally dry tropical environments at around 650 meters elevation in Tocantins and Goiás, Brazil growing in full sun on exfoliating granite rocks mixed with humus, often alongside bromeliads.

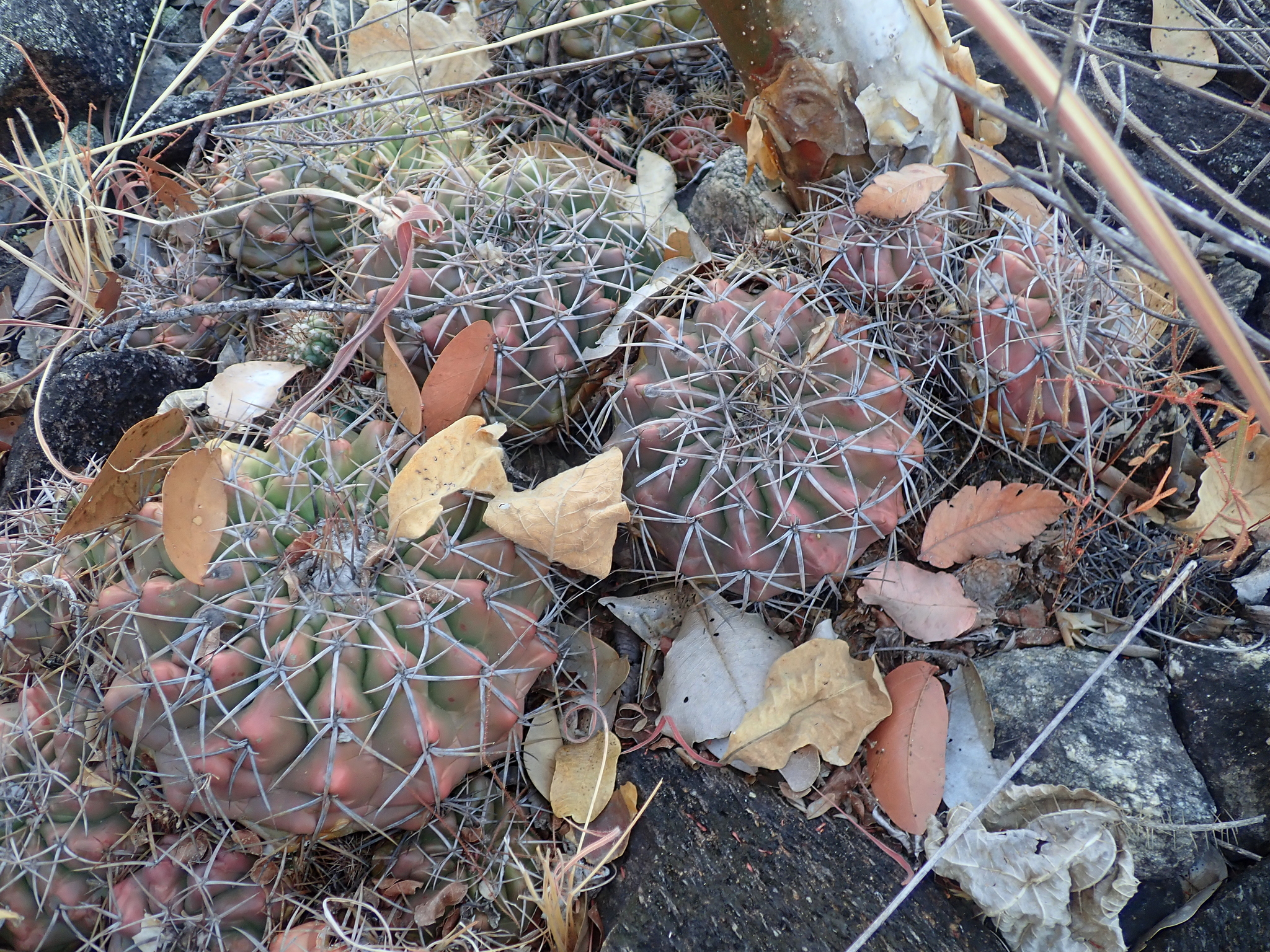
Habitat in Imburana - Arraias, State of Tocantins, Brazil

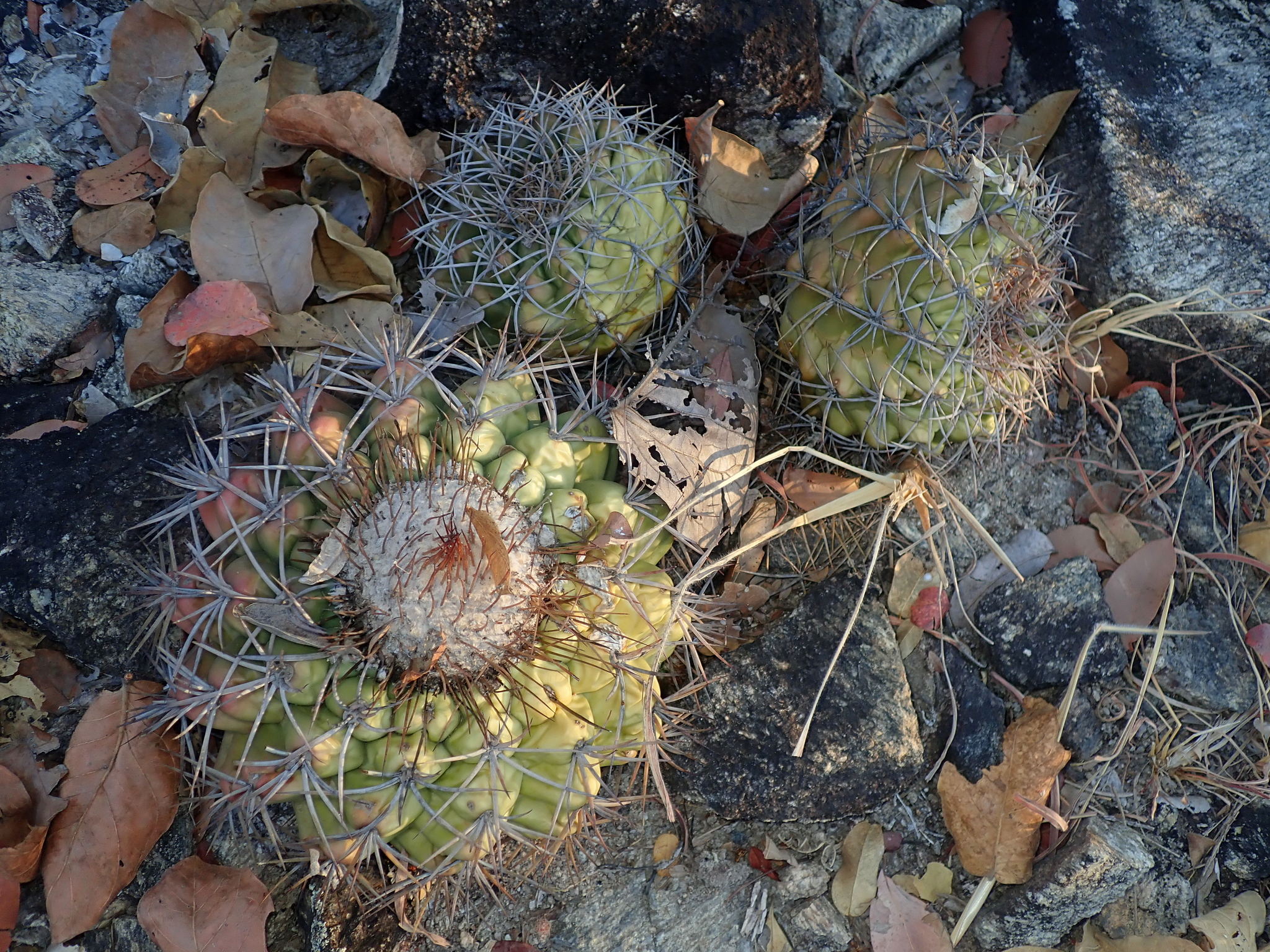

== Taxonomy ==
Discocactus diersianus was described by Eddie Esteves Pereira and published in 1979, with the specific epithet honoring German botanist Lothar Diers.
