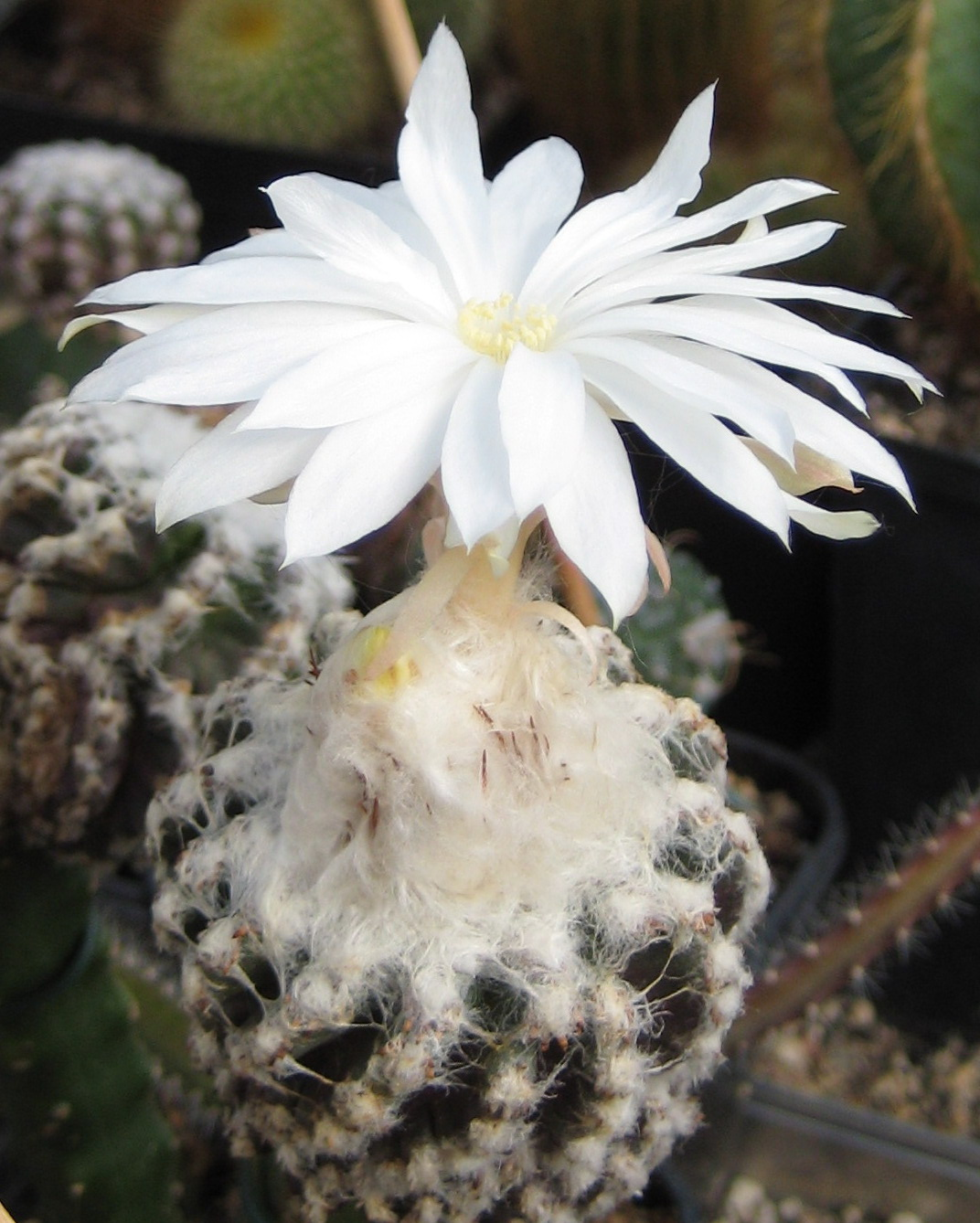

Conservation status
- Vulnerable (IUCN 3.1)

Scientific classification
- Kingdom: Plantae
- Clade: Tracheophytes
- Clade: Angiosperms
- Clade: Eudicots
- Order: Caryophyllales
- Family: Cactaceae
- Subfamily: Cactoideae
- Genus: Discocactus
- Species: D. horstii

Binomial name
- Discocactus horstii Buining & Brederoo

Synonyms
- Discocactus woutersianus Brederoo & Broek 1980

= Discocactus horstii =

Species of cacti

Discocactus horstii is a species of Discocactus found in Brazil.

== Description ==
The plant itself is depressed and globular, with stems reaching approximately 2 cm in height and up to 6 cm in diameter. Its epidermis can range from purple-brown to green and it possesses branched roots. The stems are characterized by 15 to 22 well-defined ribs, which are arranged vertically or slightly spirally and are not divided into tubercles. These ribs are somewhat sinuous between the areoles, which themselves appear 2 to 6 times per rib. The areoles are oval to elongated, not sunken, and measure 1 to 1.5 mm in length and 0.25 to 1 mm in width. The spines are comb-shaped, brown with a gray coating, firmly attached to the stem, and lack central spines. There are 9 to 11 radial spines, each measuring 3 to 3.5 cm in length.

Adult plants develop a woolly structure at their apex called a cephalium, measuring 1 to 1.5 cm in height and 1.8 to 2 cm in diameter. This cephalium, composed of white wool and edged with bright to dark bristles up to 2 cm long, is believed to protect the plant's sensitive tip from cold and intense UV radiation, and may also play a role in attracting pollinators due to its conspicuousness even before flowering.

The flowers of Discocactus horstii are white, tubular, and fragrant, opening at night and pollinated by moths. They emerge from the edge of the cephalium and measure 6 to 7.5 cm long and up to 6 cm in diameter. The flower buds are yellow-brown. The ovary is naked at the base and bears few naked scales, while the slender floral tube, measuring 3.6 cm long, is adorned with yellowish-brown scales externally and white scales internally. The inner perianth segments are white and 2 to 2.4 cm long, and the outer segments are also white, measuring 3 to 3.5 cm long. The stamens have yellow anthers measuring 0.7 mm long on filaments that are 3 to 4 mm long. The style is 3.7 cm long and terminates in a stigma with up to 6 lobes. Internally, ovules are arranged in clusters of 2 to 4, with funicles that are either naked or hairy. The fruits are white and club-shaped, reaching up to 3 cm in length and about 0.4 cm in width. They split longitudinally at maturity, retaining persistent floral remnants. Within the fruits are shiny, oval-shaped black seeds, measuring 1 to 1.1 mm long, with a testa covered in rows of nipple-shaped tubercles.

== Distribution ==
Discocactus horstii is a small, solitary cactus that grows in southeastern Brazil, specifically in the Serra do Barão region of northern Minas Gerais, typically under shrubs in seasonally dry tropical biomes. This species grows in gravel and quartz sand soils at elevations between 800 and 1200 meters.

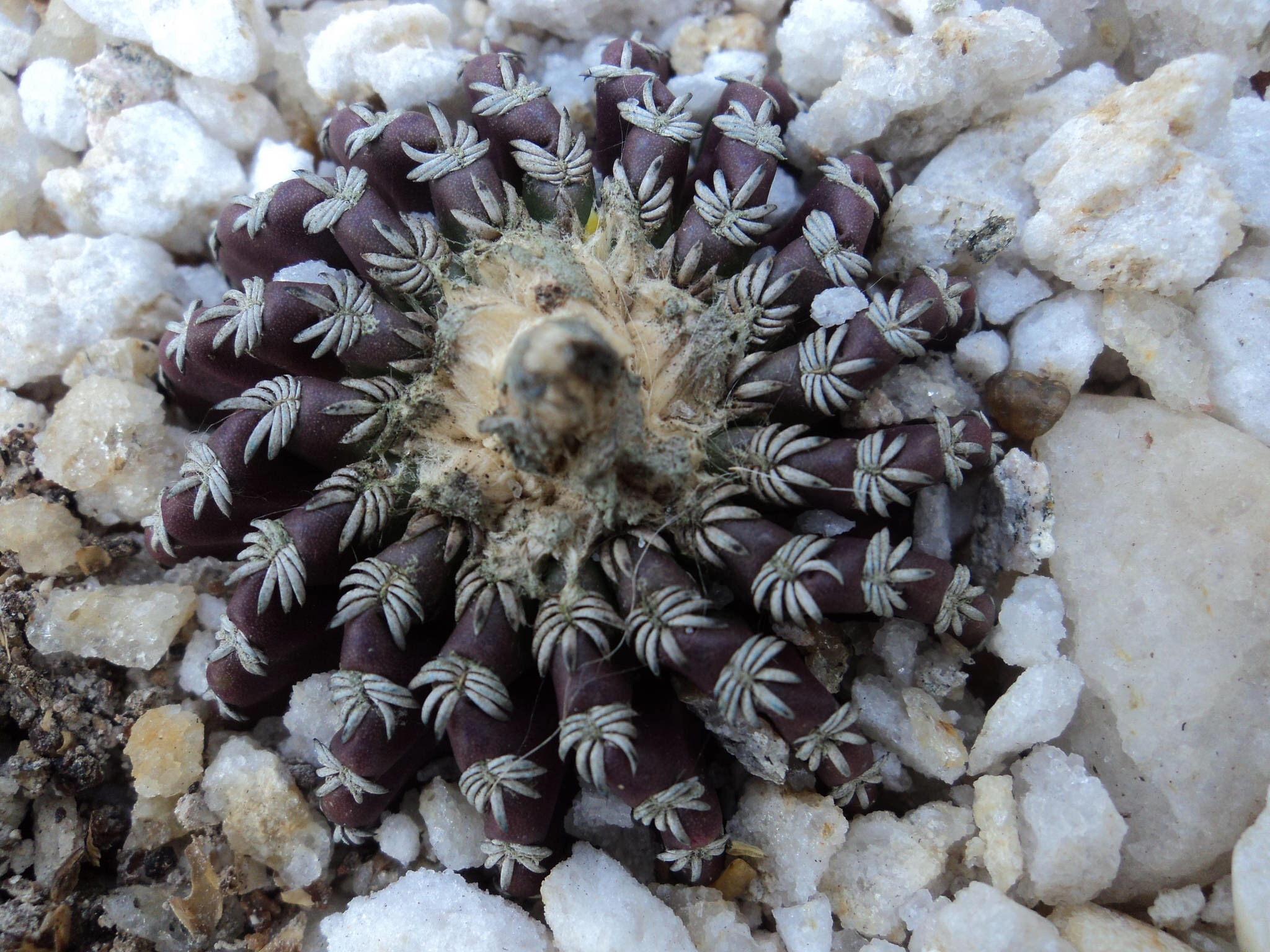
Plant growing in habitat in Grao Mogol, Minas Gerais

== Taxonomy ==
It was described in 1973 by Albert Frederik Hendrik Buining and A.J. Brederoo and named in honor of its discoverer, Leopoldo Horst.
