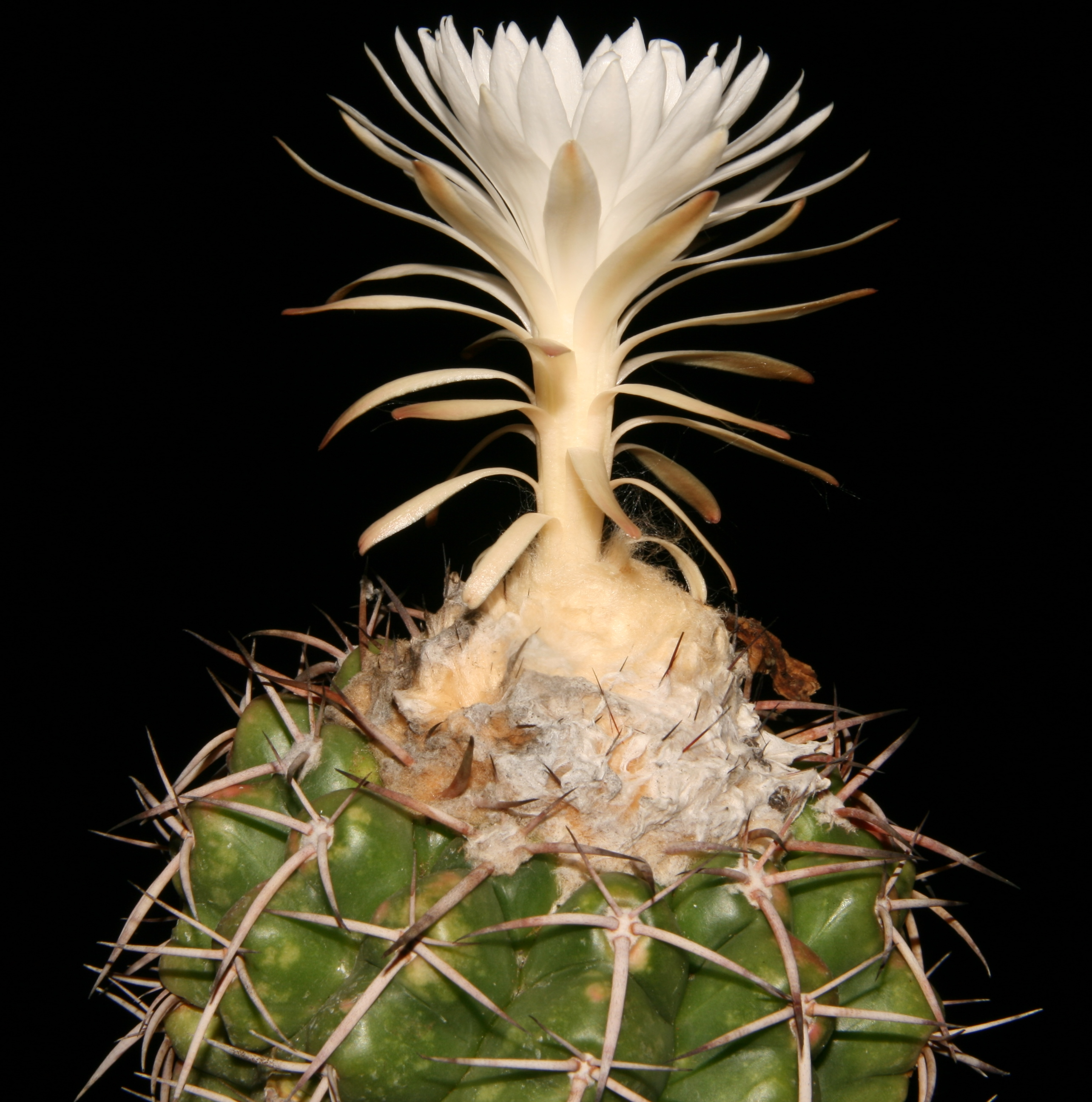

Conservation status
- Least Concern (IUCN 3.1)

Scientific classification
- Kingdom: Plantae
- Clade: Tracheophytes
- Clade: Angiosperms
- Clade: Eudicots
- Order: Caryophyllales
- Family: Cactaceae
- Subfamily: Cactoideae
- Genus: Discocactus
- Species: D. placentiformis

Binomial name
- Discocactus placentiformis (Lehm.) K.Schum.

Synonyms
- List: Cactus placentiformis Lehm.; Discocactus lehmannii Pfeiff.; Echinocactus lehmannii Ser.; Echinocactus placentiformis (Lehm.) K.Schum.; Melocactus placentiformis (Lehm.) DC.; Cactus alteolens (Lem.) Kuntze; Discocactus alteolens K.Schum.; Discocactus alteolens (Lem.) A.Dietr.; Discocactus besleri F.A.C.Weber; Discocactus crystallophilus Diers & Esteves; Discocactus insignis Pfeiff.; Discocactus latispinus Buining & Brederoo; Discocactus latispinus subsp. pseudolatispinus (Diers & Esteves) P.J.Braun & Esteves; Discocactus latispinus subsp. pulvinicapitatus (Buining & Brederoo) P.J.Braun & Esteves; Discocactus linkii Pfeiff.; Discocactus multicolorispinus P.J.Braun & Brederoo; Discocactus placentiformis subsp. alteolens (Lem.) P.J.Braun & Esteves; Discocactus placentiformis var. alteolens (Lem.) P.J.Braun & Esteves; Discocactus placentiformis subsp. multicolorispinus P.J.Braun & Esteves; Discocactus placentiformis subsp. pugionacanthus (Buining & Brederoo) P.J.Braun & Esteves; Discocactus placentiformis var. pugionacanthus (Buining & Brederoo) P.J.Braun & Esteves; Discocactus pseudolatispinus Diers & Esteves; Discocactus pugionacanthus Buining & Brederoo; Discocactus pulvinicapitatus Buining & Brederoo; Discocactus tricornis Monv. ex Pfeiff. & Otto; Echinocactus alteolens Lem.; Echinocactus besleri (Link & Otto) Ser.; Echinocactus insignis (Pfeiff.) Ser.; Echinocactus tricornis Monv. ex A.Dietr.; Melocactus besleri Link & Otto

= Discocactus placentiformis =

Species of cactus

Discocactus placentiformis is a species of flowering plant in the family Cactaceae. It is found in Brazil.

== Description ==
Discocactus placentiformis is a small, solitary cactus characterized by its depressed, globular stem, which can reach 3.5 to 13.4 cm in height and 6 to 29 cm in diameter. Its epidermis is dark green and it possesses branched roots. The stem features 9 to 26 distinct ribs, arranged vertically or slightly spirally, divided into tubercles with shallow grooves between areoles. These oval to elongated, sunken areoles, measuring 0.3 to 1.5 cm long and 0.2 to 1.2 cm wide, are located above ground and there are typically 3 to 9 per rib. Spines are gray to brown and flattened or rounded in cross-section, consisting of a single central spine, sometimes absent, that is 0.9 to 2 cm long and 1 mm in diameter, along with 3 to 10 radial spines ranging from 0.5 to 4.5 cm long and 1 to 4 mm in diameter.

Adult plants develop a woolly cephalium at their apex, measuring 0.5 to 7 cm high and 1 to 11 cm in diameter. This sometimes depressed structure, composed of white wool and dark bristles on its margin, protects the plant's sensitive tip from cold and intense UV radiation and is thought to attract pollinators due to its showy appearance even before flowering. The flowers, which emerge from the cephalium's edge, are white, fragrant, and funnel-shaped, opening at night and attracting moths. They can be solitary or in clusters of 2 to 16, reaching up to 8.5 cm in length and 7.5 to 8.5 cm in diameter. The ovoid pericarpel (ovary), 5 to 7 mm long and 4 to 6 mm wide, varies in color from white and reddish-brown to pink. The slender floral tube, 3.4 to 5 cm long and 0.7 to 1.2 cm wide, has fleshy, olive to brown scales. Inner perianth segments are 1.5 to 3 cm long and white, while outer segments are 1.8 to 3.5 cm long and greenish-white. Stamens have 4 to 5 mm long filaments and 0.75 to 2 mm long yellow anthers. The style is 3 to 4.5 cm long and the stigma has 4 to 8 cream to white lobes, enclosing ovules arranged in clusters of 1 to 5.

The fruits are club-shaped, white to reddish at the apex, and measure 3 to 5 cm long and 0.5 to 1.5 cm wide. They split longitudinally when ripe and retain persistent floral remnants. Inside, they contain shiny, oval, black seeds measuring 1.2 to 1.9 mm long and 1 to 2 mm wide, with a testa covered in irregularly distributed nipple-shaped tubercles.

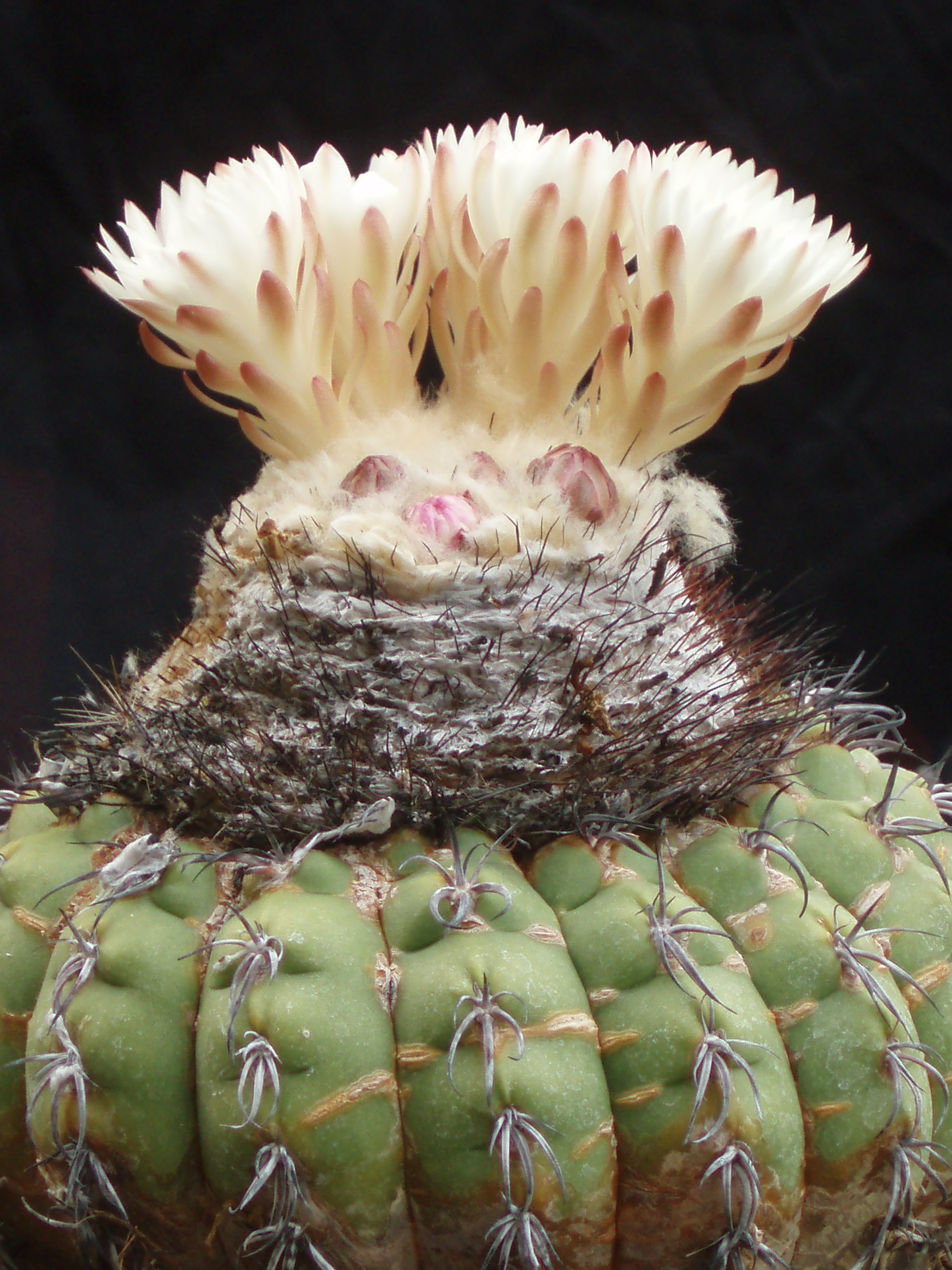
Flower buds

== Distribution ==
Discocactus placentiformis is native to Brazil, specifically the states of Bahia, Minas Gerais, and Mato Grosso, where it grows in the seasonally dry tropical biome at elevations between 550 and 1275 meters. Morphological characteristics such as shape, size, and spines can vary significantly based on the substrate; plants are more globose and elongated on sandstone rocks, and more flattened in gravel or sandy soil.

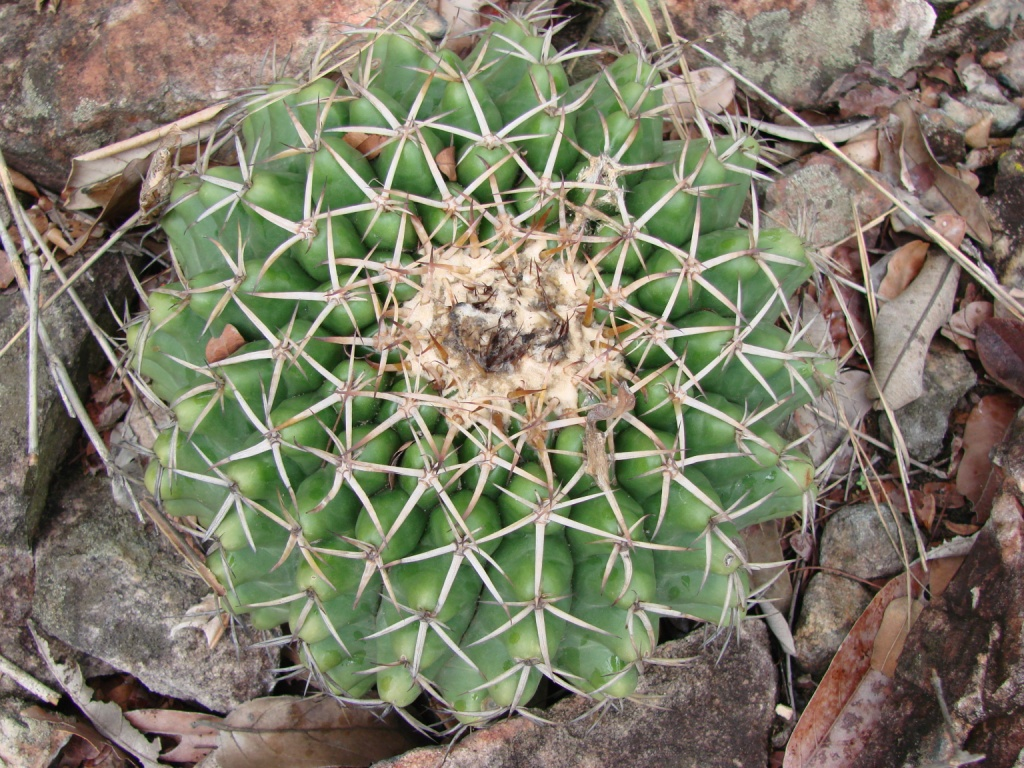
Plant growing in habitat in Salto do Itiquira, Goiás

== Taxonomy ==
First described as Cactus placentiformis by Johann Georg Christian Lehmann in 1836, the species was later transferred to the genus Discocactus by Karl Moritz Schumann in 1894. The specific epithet *placentiformis* derives from the Latin words "placenta" (cake or pie) and "formis" (shaped), referencing the plant's flattened, spherical stem.
