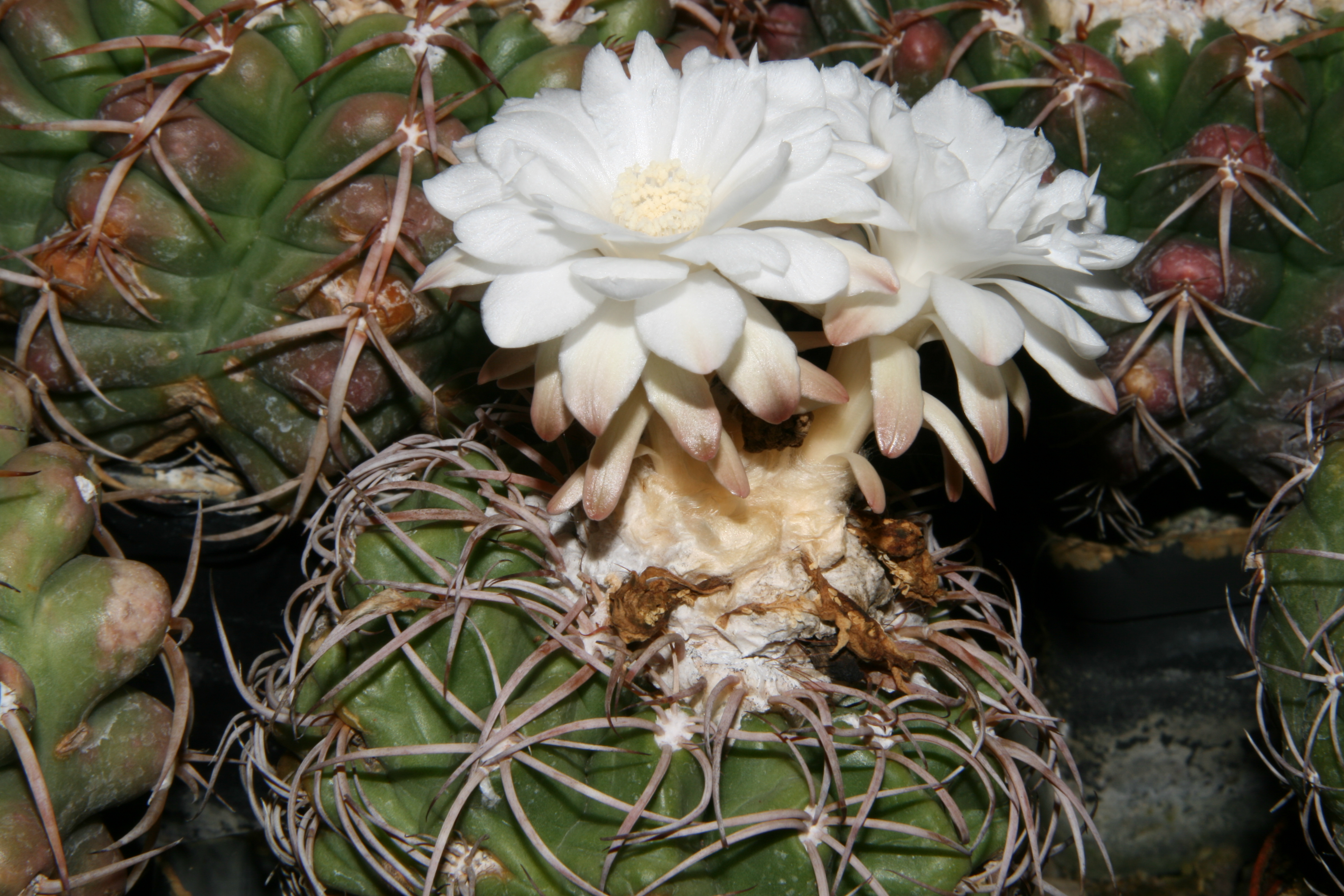

Conservation status
- Vulnerable (IUCN 3.1)
- CITES Appendix I

Scientific classification
- Kingdom: Plantae
- Clade: Tracheophytes
- Clade: Angiosperms
- Clade: Eudicots
- Order: Caryophyllales
- Family: Cactaceae
- Subfamily: Cactoideae
- Genus: Discocactus
- Species: D. bahiensis

Binomial name
- Discocactus bahiensis Britton & Rose 1922

Synonyms
- Echinocactus bahiensis (Britton & Rose) Luetzelb. 1926

= Discocactus bahiensis =

Species of cactus

Discocactus bahiensis is a species of Discocactus from Brazil.

== Description ==
Discocactus bahiensis grows solitary and rarely clumping, with heavily spined. The stems are pale green, depressed spherical to spherical bodies that reach diameters of 5.5 to 18 cm (2.2 to 7.1 in) and 3 to 7 cm (1.2 to 2.8 in) tall. They usually grow with the stem buried in the soil, either partially or completely, and their roots are somewhat thickened, and napiform. There are 10 to 15 ribs with well-developed tubercles and 2 to 5 oval areole per rib. The areoles are 3 to 10 mm (0.12 to 0.39 in) long and 3 to 8 mm (0.12 to 0.31 in) wide, woolly becoming glabrous with age, with 5 to 14 backward-curved spines. The spines are stiff, woody and creamy to gray-brown and measure 0.6 to 4.5 cm (0.24 to 1.77 in) long and 0.5 to 3 mm (0.020 to 0.118 in) wide. The prominent cephalium is formed of white wool and a few short bristles measuring 2.2 to 4.7 cm (0.87 to 1.85 in) tall and 0.9 to 2.1 cm (0.35 to 0.83 in) wide. The slender, funnel-shaped, sweet-scented, yellowish white flowers arise from the edge of the cephalium. The flowers open at night and are 4–7 cm (1.6–2.8 in) long and 2.3–5.4 cm (0.91–2.13 in) in diameter, and the buds are green to brown. Flowering occurs between November and February, peaking in January, when most plants bear 1–5 flowers at a time. The fruits are globular and slightly fleshy, small and red measuring 1.2–5 cm (0.47–1.97 in) long and 0.7–1 cm (0.28–0.39 in) wide. The seeds are oval and black

=== Subspecies ===
Accepted Subspecies:

Image	Subspecies	Description	Distribution
	Discocactus bahiensis subsp. bahiensis	Plants reach diameters of up to 7 cm. It usually has between 10 and 16 well-defined ribs.	Brazil (Ceará, N. Bahia)
	Discocactus bahiensis subsp. gracilis P.J.Braun & Esteves	Plants have smaller, thinner stem, reaching approximately 6 cm in diameter. It has about 10 ribs, which are often almost hidden by the dense covering of spines.	Brazil (Bahia)

== Distribution ==
Discocactus bahiensis is a cactus species native to the Brazilian states of Bahia, Ceará, Pernambuco, and Piauí at altitudes between 380 and 650 meters. Plants are found growing in rocky and sandy loam, among iron-stained limestone or quartzite formations, near rivers and flood plains.

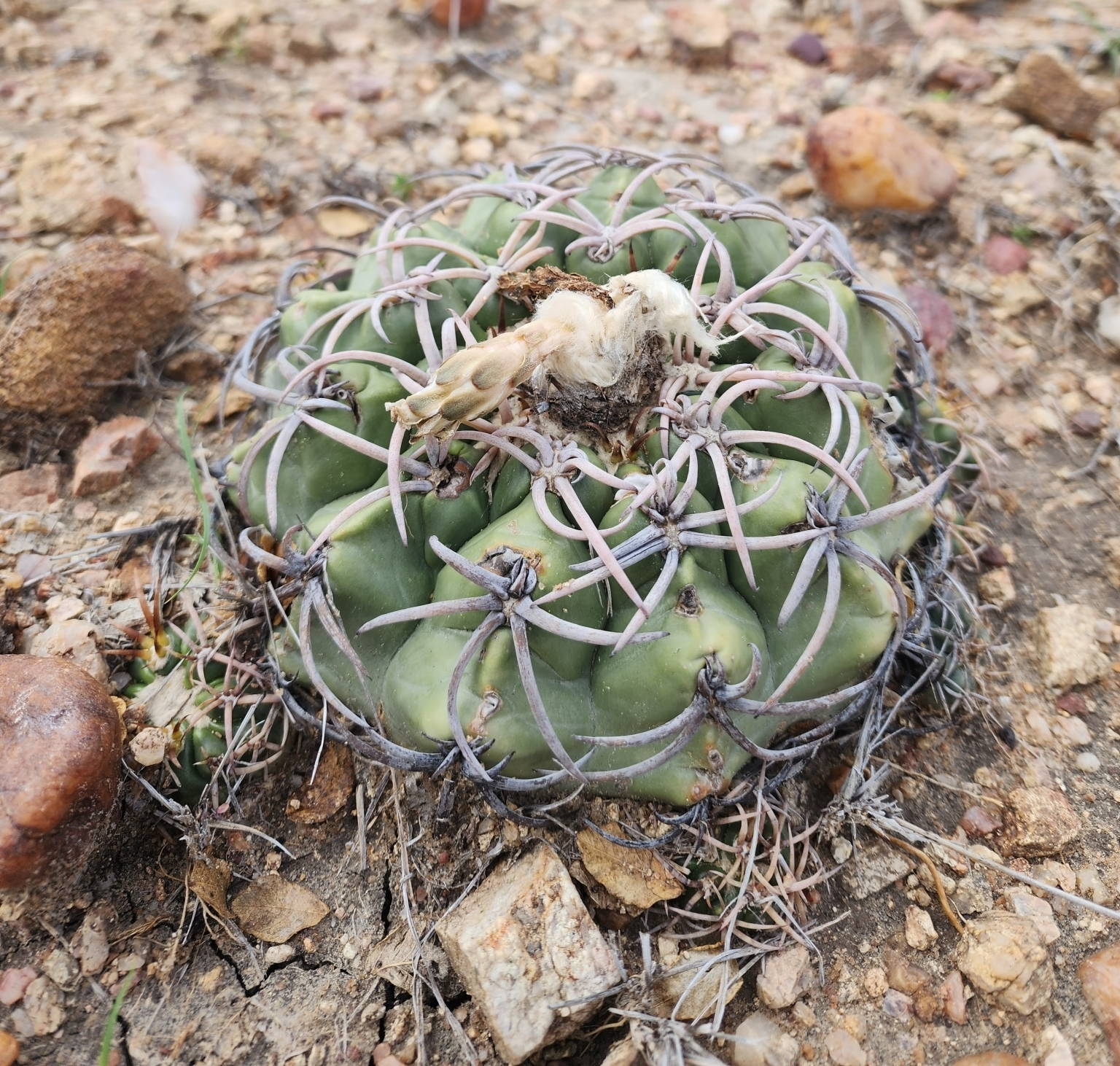
Discocactus bahiensis bahiensis in habitat in Bahia, Brazil

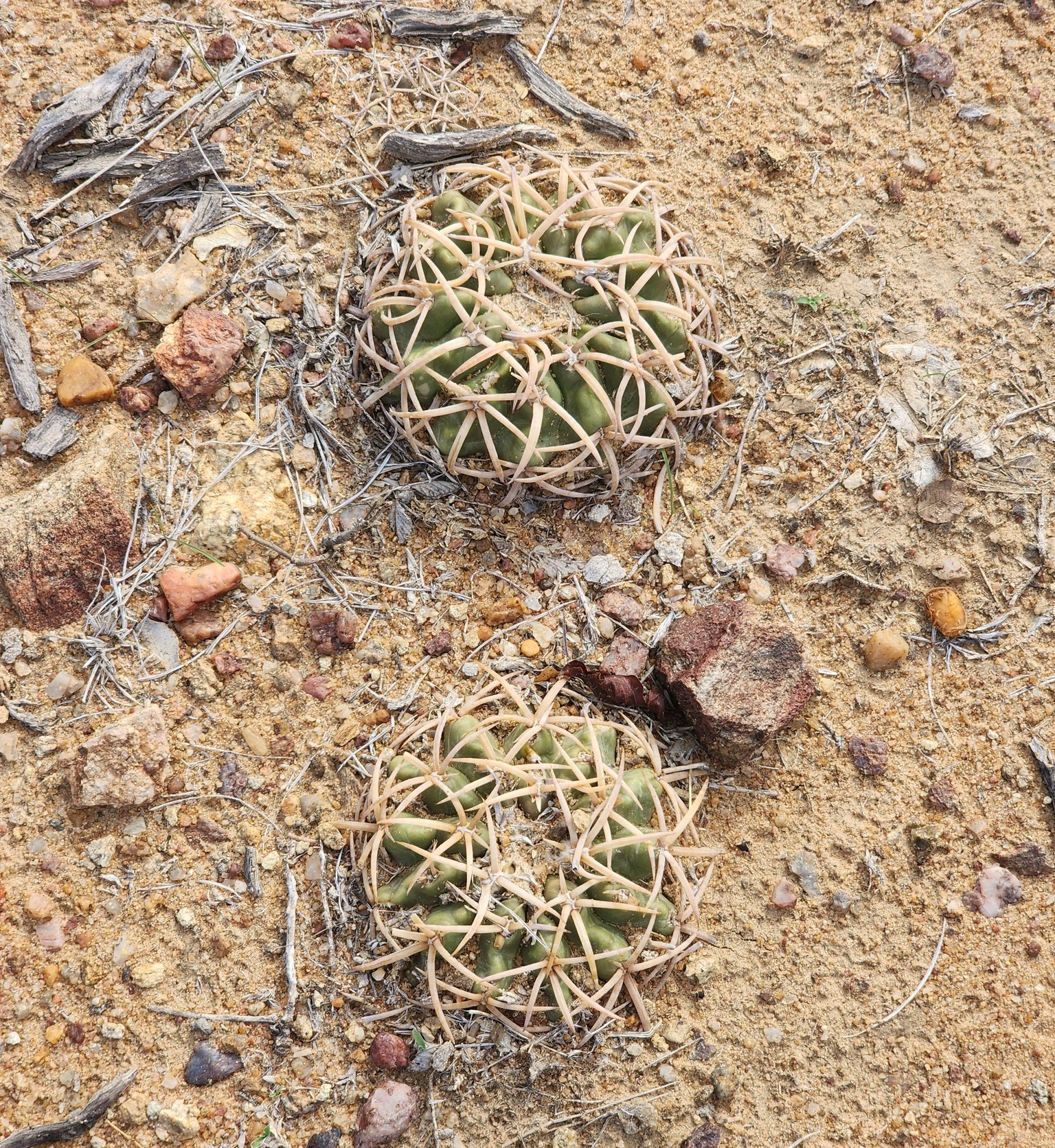
Plant growing in habitat in Bahia, Brazil

== Taxonomy ==
It was first described in 1922 by Nathaniel Lord Britton and Joseph Nelson Rose. The species name "bahiensis" specifically denotes its presence in Bahia, Brazil.
