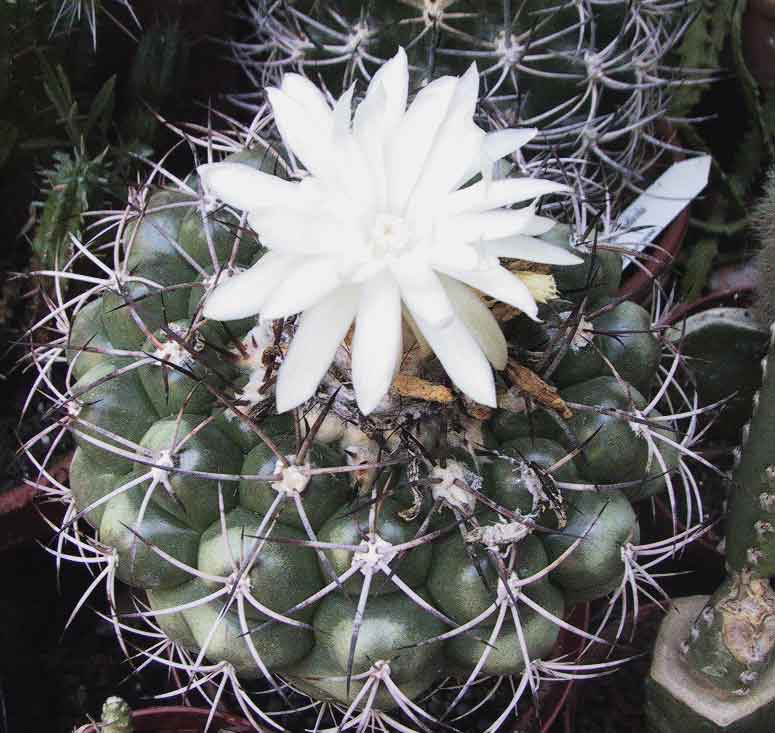

Conservation status
- Endangered (IUCN 3.1)

Scientific classification
- Kingdom: Plantae
- Clade: Tracheophytes
- Clade: Angiosperms
- Clade: Eudicots
- Order: Caryophyllales
- Family: Cactaceae
- Subfamily: Cactoideae
- Genus: Discocactus
- Species: D. ferricola

Binomial name
- Discocactus ferricola Buining & Brederoo

= Discocactus ferricola =

Species of tropical cacti

Discocactus ferricola is a species of Discocactus found in Bolivia and Brazil.
