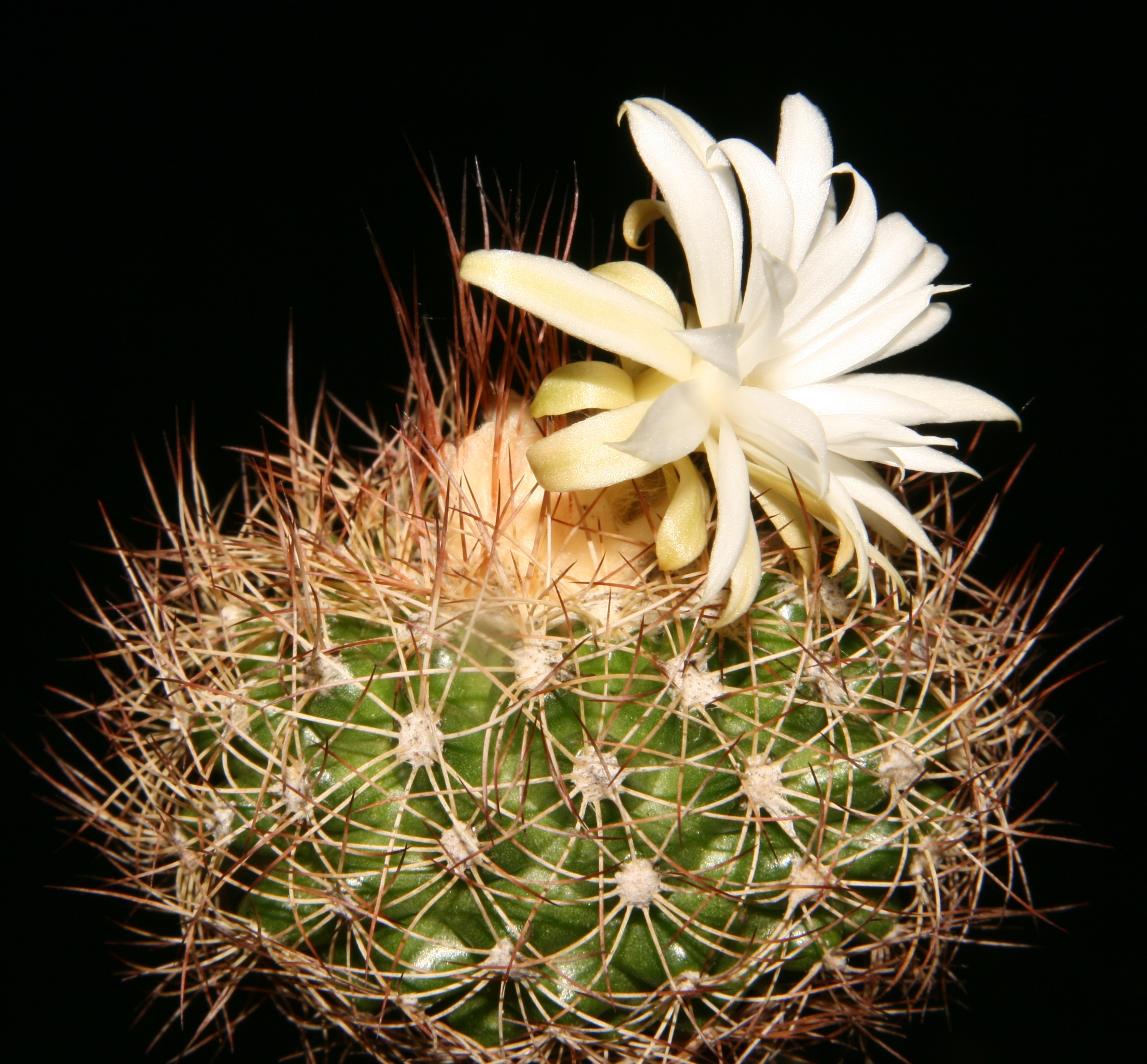

Conservation status
- Vulnerable (IUCN 3.1)

Scientific classification
- Kingdom: Plantae
- Clade: Tracheophytes
- Clade: Angiosperms
- Clade: Eudicots
- Order: Caryophyllales
- Family: Cactaceae
- Subfamily: Cactoideae
- Genus: Discocactus
- Species: D. zehntneri

Binomial name
- Discocactus zehntneri Britton & Rose

Synonyms
- Echinocactus zehntneri (Britton & Rose) Luetzelb. 1926

= Discocactus zehntneri =

Species of cactus

Discocactus zehntneri is a species of Discocactus found in Brazil.

== Description ==
Discocactus zehntneri is a solitary cactus characterized by its dull-green, spherical or flattened spherical shape, growing up to 7 cm (2.8 in) tall and 10 cm (3.9 in) in diameter. It features 12 to 20 slightly tubercled ribs, each up to 10 mm (0.39 in) high, with areoles that are somewhat sunken into these ribs. The cactus boasts strong spines that are white or yellowish at the base, darkening at the tips, and turning to light brown or whitish towards the ends. These spines are downturned and densely packed, effectively hiding the plant's body from view. Notably, there is no central spine. It has approximately 11 radial spines that resemble combs and can reach up to 4.2 cm (1.7 in) in length. The cephalium, which is formed of cream to white wool and yellowish to brown bristles measuring up to 2 cm (0.79 in) long, can grow up to 1 cm (0.39 in) high and has a diameter of 3.5 cm (1.4 in). The flowers of Discocactus zehntneri are slender and funnel-shaped, reaching lengths of up to 9 cm (3.5 in). Its fruit is club-shaped, red, and can grow up to 2.5 cm (0.98 in) long.

=== Subspecies ===
Accepted subspecies:

Image	Subspecies	Distribution
	Discocactus zehntneri subsp. alagoinhensis Zachar & Halfar	Brazil (Piauí)
	Discocactus zehntneri subsp. boomianus (Buining & Brederoo) N.P.Taylor & Zappi	Brazil (N. Bahia)
	Discocactus zehntneri subsp. mirohalfarii Zachar	Brazil (Piauí)
	Discocactus zehntneri subsp. zehntneri	Brazil (N. Bahia)

== Distribution ==
This species is commonly found in the northern Brazilian state of Bahia, growing between rocks in sand and gravel at elevations between 400 and 1100 meters.

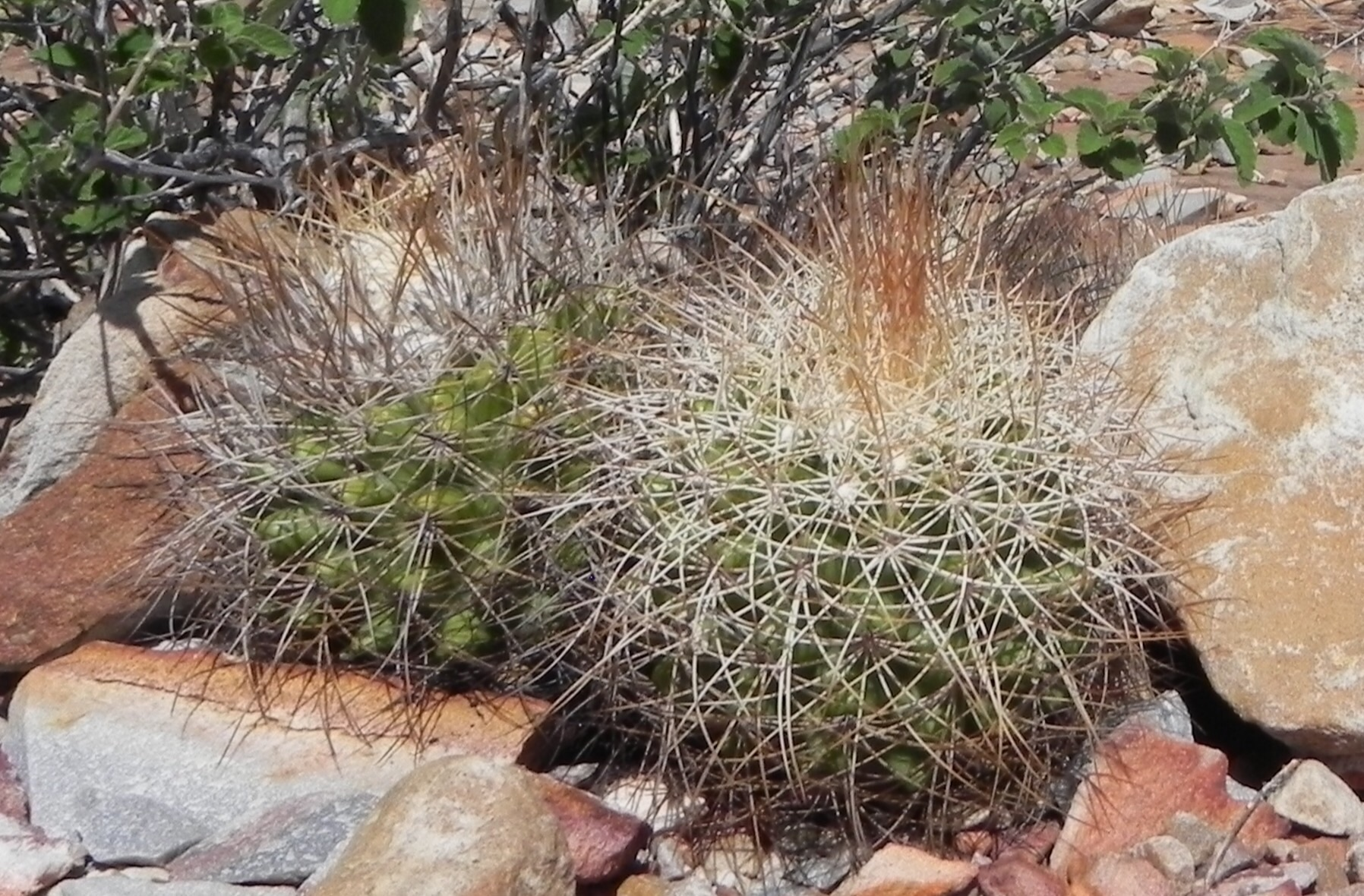
Discocactus zehntneri ssp. boomianus growing in Bahia, Brasil habitat

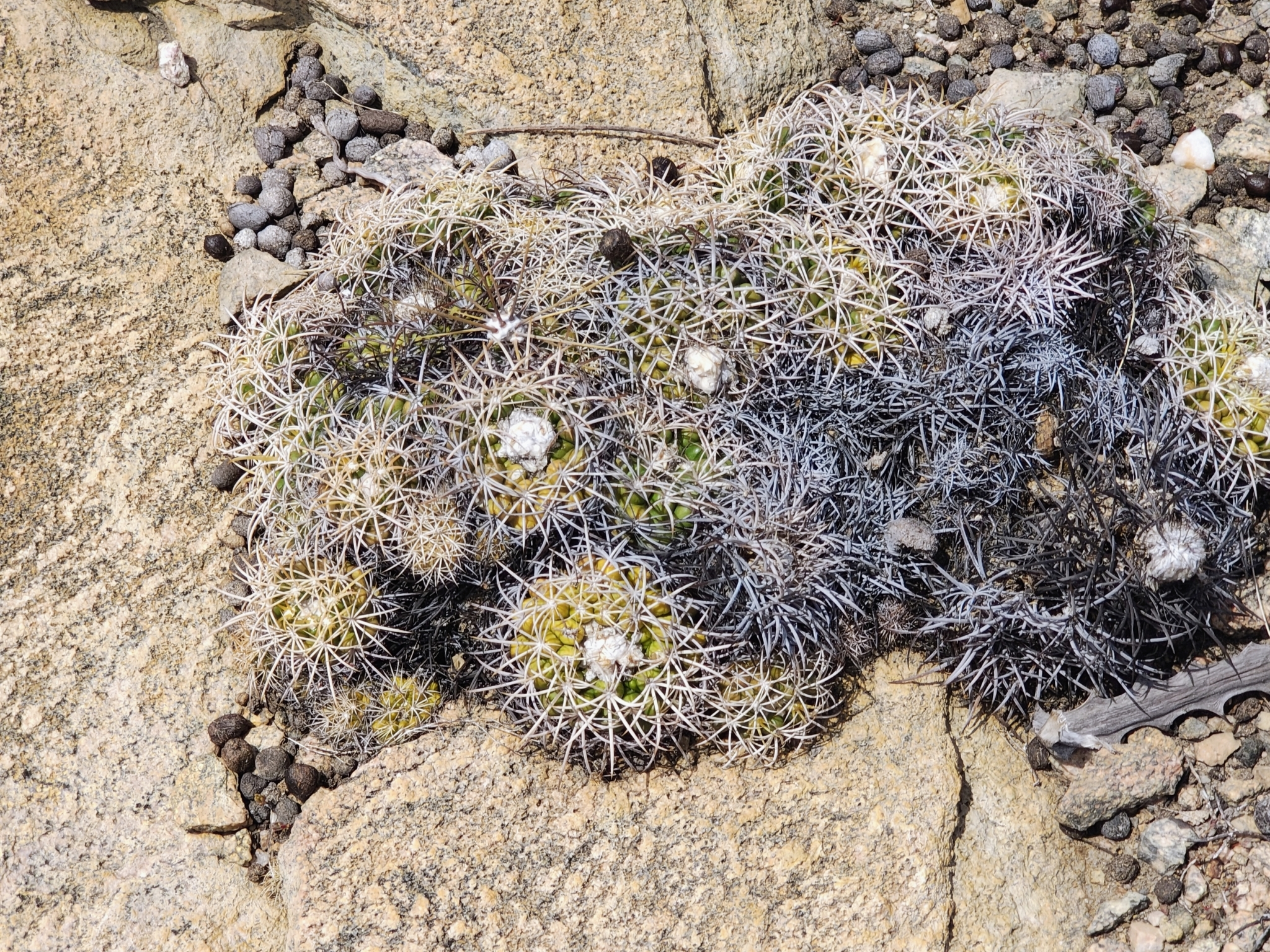
Discocactus zehntneri ssp. zehntneri growing in Petrolina, State of Pernambuco, Brazil

== Taxonomy ==
It was first described in 1922 by Nathaniel Lord Britton and Joseph Nelson Rose, with the specific name "zehntneri" honoring Swiss biologist Leo Zehntner.
