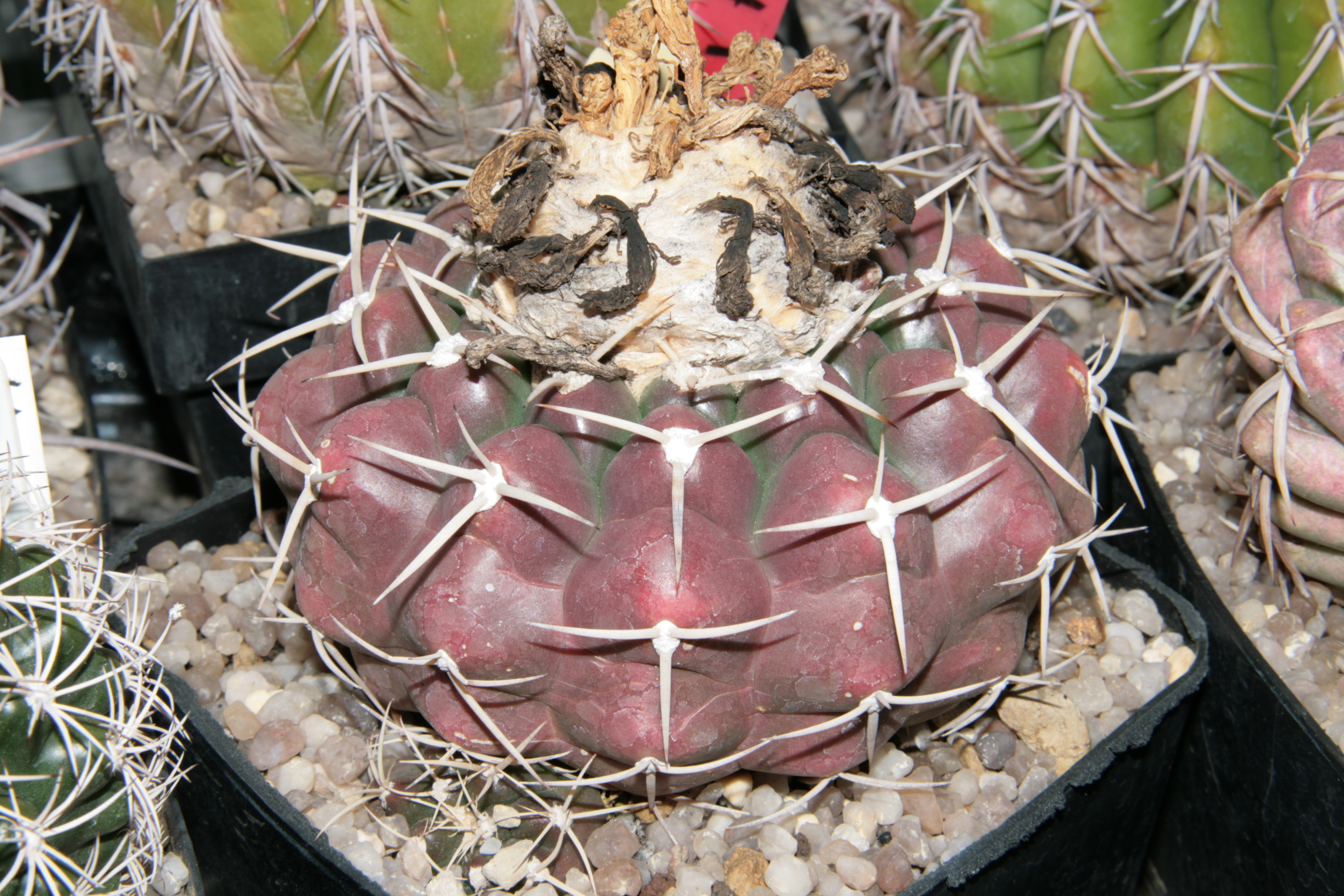

Conservation status
- Vulnerable (IUCN 3.1)

Scientific classification
- Kingdom: Plantae
- Clade: Tracheophytes
- Clade: Angiosperms
- Clade: Eudicots
- Order: Caryophyllales
- Family: Cactaceae
- Subfamily: Cactoideae
- Genus: Discocactus
- Species: D. boliviensis

Binomial name
- Discocactus boliviensis Backeb. ex Buining

Synonyms
- Neodiscocactus boliviensis (Backeb. ex Buining) Y.Itô 1981

= Discocactus boliviensis =

Species of cactus

Discocactus boliviensis is a species of Discocactus found in Bolivia.

== Description ==
This cactus species forms clusters through lateral shoots and seedlings, characterized by a somewhat flattened, globose shape. Its stems typically measure 25 to 29 cm (9.8 to 11.4 in) in diameter and up to 15 cm (5.9 in) in height, with a light to dark green epidermis. The plant possesses branched, thickened roots. The stems feature 12 to 13 well-defined ribs, which can be arranged vertically or spirally. These ribs bear prominent, rounded to pentagonal tubercles. Oval areoles, measuring 4 to 8 mm (0.16 to 0.31 in) long and 3 to 6 mm (0.12 to 0.24 in) wide, are situated on these tubercles, typically 2 to 5 per rib, and appear sunken above ground level. Spines transition in color from yellow when young to brown or gray with age. They are rounded in cross-section and can be straight, curved upwards, or downwards. Discocactus boliviensis lacks central spines; instead, it has 5 to 8 radial spines that are 1.6 to 3.5 cm (0.63 to 1.38 in) long. Adult plants develop a distinctive woolly structure at their apex called a cephalium. This cephalium, measuring 1.5 to 7 cm (0.59 to 2.76 in) high and 3.5 to 6 cm (1.4 to 2.4 in) wide, is composed of white wool and has brown bristles along its margin. The cephalium serves to protect the plant's sensitive apex from cold nights and intense UV radiation, and is also believed to attract pollinators due to its conspicuousness even before flowering. The flowers are white, funnel-shaped, sweetly scented, and open at night, attracting moths for pollination. They measure 3.8 to 6 cm (1.5 to 2.4 in) long and 4.3 to 5.5 cm (1.7 to 2.2 in) in diameter. Flower buds are olive-brown. The floral tube is slender, up to 3.2 cm (1.3 in) long, and covered with small, fleshy scales. The perianth segments are white with olive-brown tips and reach up to 1.7 cm (0.67 in) in length. Stamens have yellow anthers, and the stigma has cream-colored lobes. The ovary is globose, approximately 4.5 mm (0.18 in) in diameter. Fruits are club-shaped, light brown to red, and measure 2.8 to 3 cm (1.1 to 1.2 in) long and up to 0.9 cm (0.35 in) wide. They mature by opening via a vertical slit and retain persistent floral remnants. Inside, they contain shiny, oval-shaped black seeds, measuring 1.7 to 2.2 mm (0.067 to 0.087 in) long, characterized by a seed coat with numerous nipple-shaped tubercles.

== Distribution ==
Discocactus boliviensis is a small cactus native to Bolivia, primarily found in the seasonally dry tropical biome at elevations around 280 meters. It grows on limestone outcrops, often nestled among bromeliads within deciduous forests.

== Taxonomy ==
The species was first described and published in the scientific journal Succulenta (Netherlands) in 1977 by Curt Backeberg and Albert Frederik Hendrik Buining. The species epithet "boliviensis" directly refers to its native country, Bolivia.
