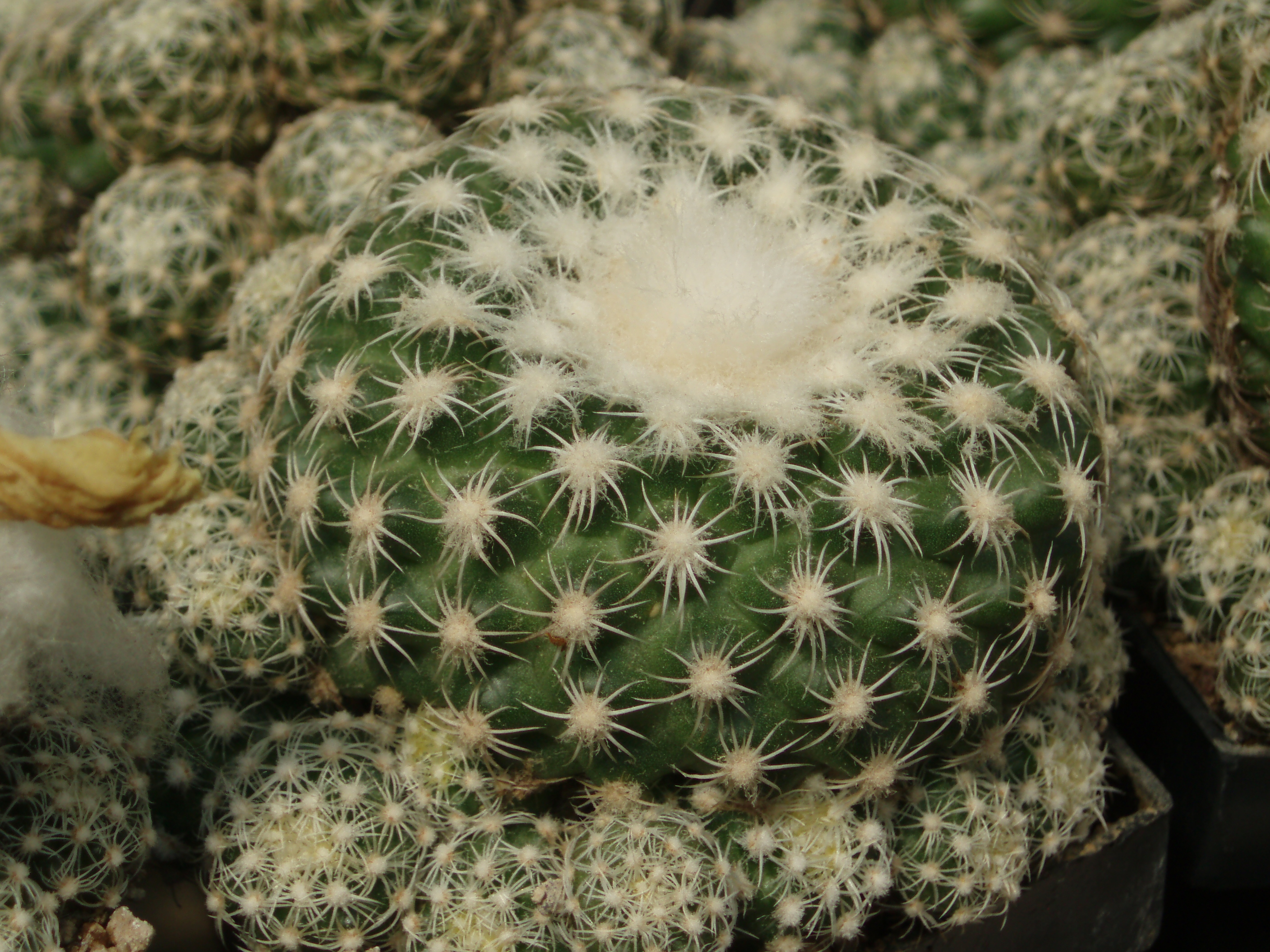

Scientific classification
- Kingdom: Plantae
- Clade: Tracheophytes
- Clade: Angiosperms
- Clade: Eudicots
- Order: Caryophyllales
- Family: Cactaceae
- Subfamily: Cactoideae
- Genus: Discocactus
- Species: D. buenekeri

Binomial name
- Discocactus buenekeri W.R.Abraham

Synonyms
- Discocactus zehntneri subsp. buenekeri (W.R.Abraham) P.J.Braun & Esteves 1993

= Discocactus buenekeri =

Species of cacti

Discocactus buenekeri is a species of Discocactus found in Brazil.

== Description ==
Discocactus buenekeri is a small cactus species that can form clumps up to 50 cm (20 in) in diameter, arising from lateral shoots and seedlings. Individual stems, typically 6 cm (2.4 in) in diameter and 3 cm (1.2 in) tall (excluding the cephalium), are a dull grayish-green and often grow buried in the soil, developing a napiform or turnip-like shape. The plant possesses a primary root that can extend up to 1 meter near the surface, sometimes accompanied by a secondary root reaching one-third that length. The stems are characterized by 14 to 19 prominent, rounded ribs, 5 to 7 mm (0.20 to 0.28 in) wide, that run vertically or spirally. These ribs are slightly decurrent and appear divided into tubercles about 5 mm (0.20 in) wide at their base, which can make them indistinct on mature plants. Oval areoles, 2 mm (0.079 in) wide and 3 mm (0.12 in) long, are situated on these tubercles, spaced 5 to 8 mm (0.20 to 0.31 in) apart. Initially covered in white wool, the areoles become bare with age. The spines are flexible, thin, and not sharp, initially white with light brown tips, later turning gray. Some spines may be twisted and curved towards the stem. There are no central spines, but 14 to 18 radial spines, measuring 4 to 5 cm (1.6 to 2.0 in) long, are present. Occasionally, two small accessory spines, only 2 mm (0.079 in) long and pointing upwards, may also be found.

Adult plants develop a woolly cephalium at their apex, measuring approximately 2 cm (0.79 in) in height and up to 3 cm (1.2 in) in diameter. This structure, composed of white wool and occasional straight, dark brown bristles up to 7 mm (0.28 in) long at its edge, serves to protect the plant's sensitive tip from cold nights and intense UV radiation. The cephalium is also thought to attract pollinators due to its showy appearance even before flowering. The flowers are white, fragrant, funnel-shaped, 5 cm (2.0 in) in diameter and height, and emerge from the cephalium's edge. They open at night, wilt the following morning, and are pollinated by moths. These flowers are self-incompatible. The buds are light pinkish-brown, and the ovary is white, appearing bare at the base and covered with naked scales higher up. The slender, ivory-white floral tube is adorned with scales 0.5 to 1.7 mm (0.020 to 0.067 in) long. The inner perianth segments are white and about 2.2 cm (0.87 in) long, while the outer segments are also 2.2 cm (0.87 in) long and reddish-brown externally, particularly at the tips. Stamens feature white filaments and yellow anthers that are 11.5 mm (0.45 in) long. The pistil is 2.5 cm (0.98 in) long and white, with five partially branched, ivory to white stigmas measuring 0.7 cm (0.28 in) long. Mature fruits are white with a greenish top and are club-shaped, measuring about 3 cm (1.2 in) long and up to 1 cm (0.39 in) wide. They split open at the tip when ripe and retain persistent floral remnants. Each fruit contains 11 to 55 shiny black, saucer-shaped seeds, measuring 2 to 2.2 mm (0.079 to 0.087 in) wide, with a testa characterized by numerous large, nipple-shaped tubercles. The embryo is globose, lacking perisperm, and the cotyledons are barely discernible.

== Distribution ==
Discocactus buenekeri is native to northeastern Brazil, specifically the state of Bahia, and thrives in the seasonally dry tropical biome at elevations around 1000 meters. It typically grows in pure quartz sand soils, with plants partially covered by sand for protection from the sun.

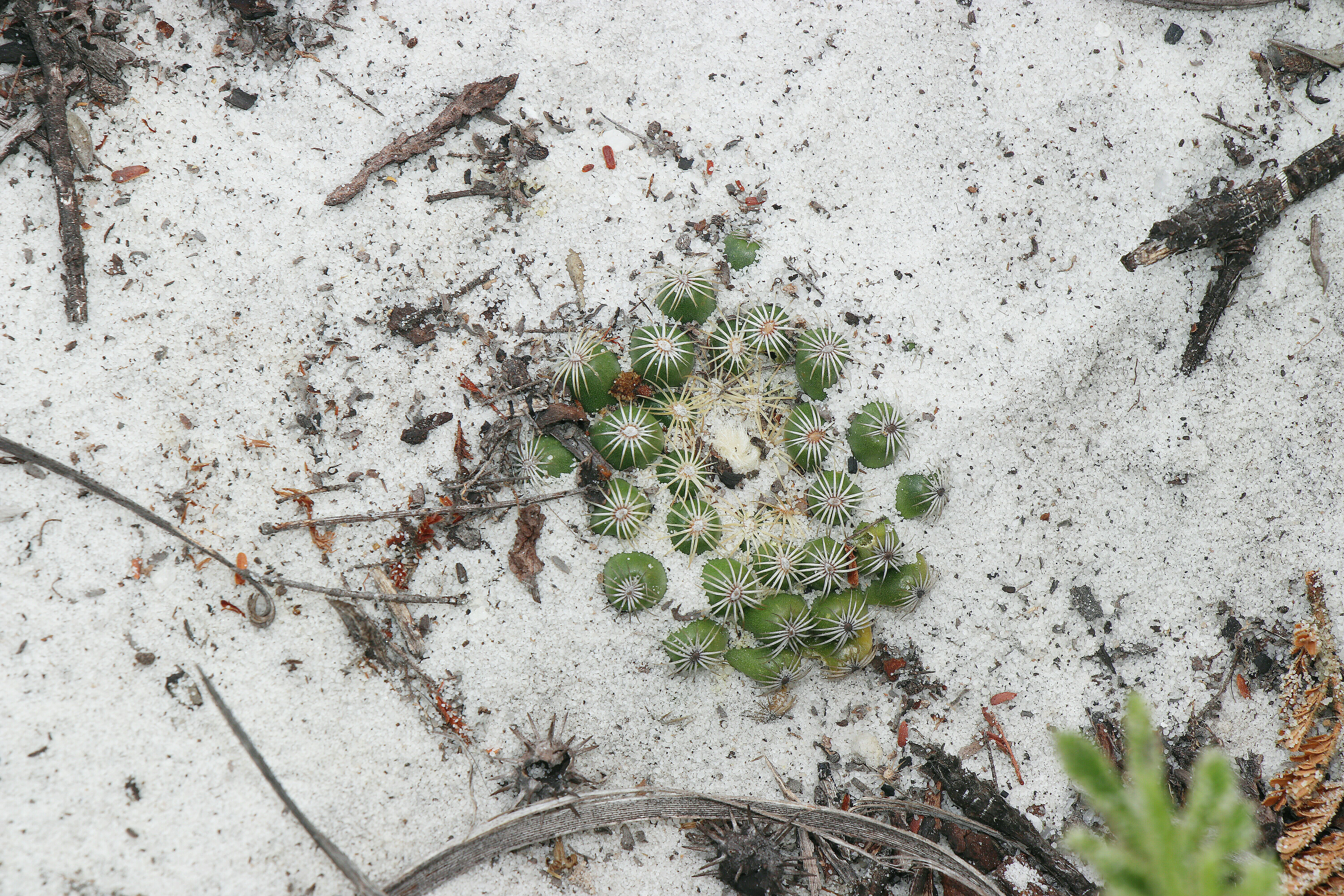
Discocactus buenekeri at type habitat, Bahia, Brasil

== Taxonomy ==
The species was described by Wolf Rainer Abraham in 1987 and named in honor of Rudi Werner Büneker, the Brazilian cactus expert credited with its discovery.
