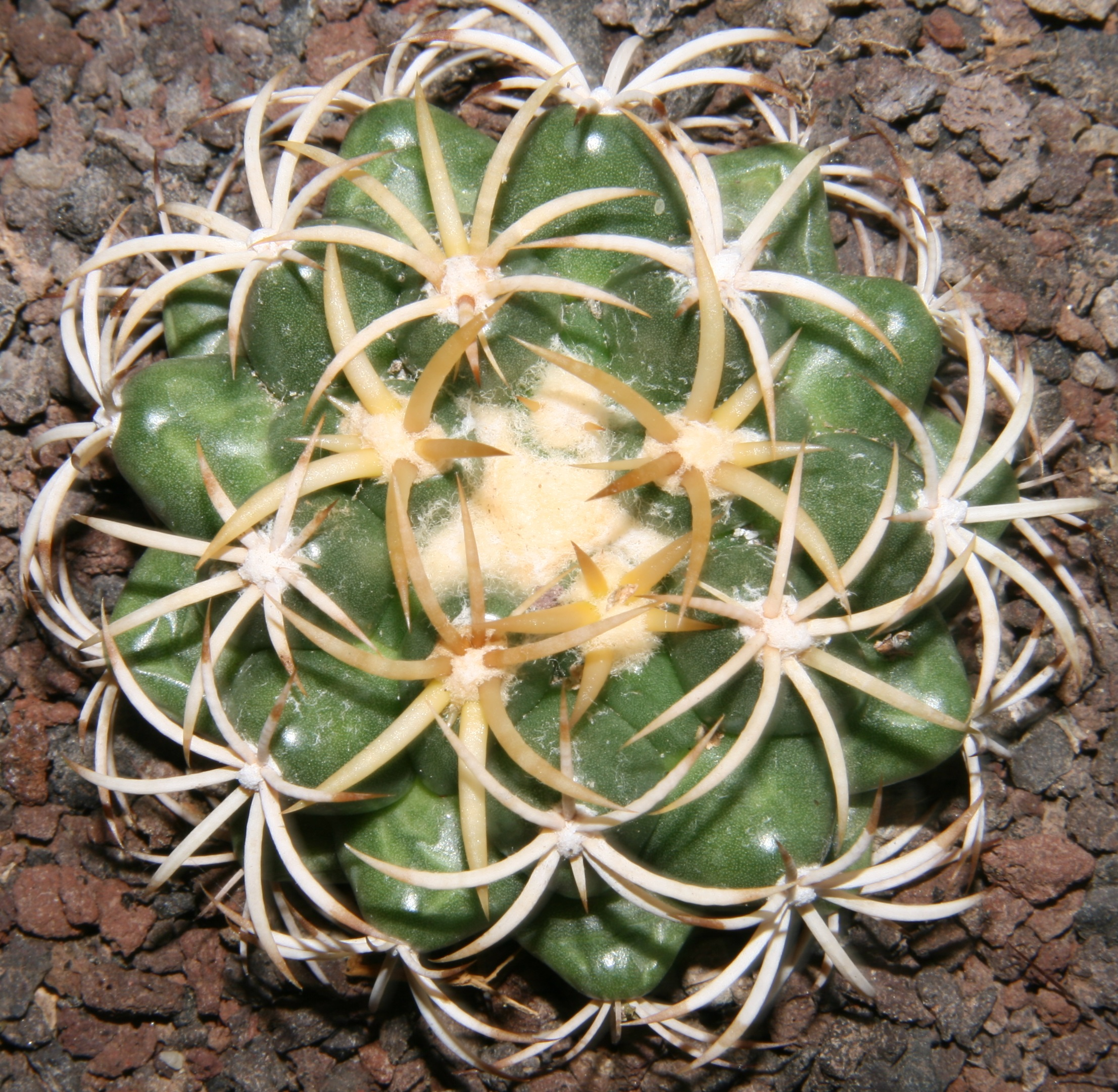

Conservation status
- Critically Endangered (IUCN 3.1)

Scientific classification
- Kingdom: Plantae
- Clade: Tracheophytes
- Clade: Angiosperms
- Clade: Eudicots
- Order: Caryophyllales
- Family: Cactaceae
- Subfamily: Cactoideae
- Genus: Discocactus
- Species: D. petr-halfarii

Binomial name
- Discocactus petr-halfarii Zachar

Synonyms
- Discocactus bahiensis subsp. petr-halfarii (Zachar) P.J.Braun & Esteves, 2008; Discocactus zehntneri subsp. petr-halfarii (Zachar) M.R.Santos & M.C.Machado, 2015

= Discocactus petr-halfarii =

Species of cactus

Discocactus petr-halfarii is a species of Discocactus found in Brazil.

== Description ==
Discocactus petr-halfarii is a small, solitary cactus species characterized by its depressed globose to globose shape. Its stems reach heights of 4 to 5 cm (1.6 to 2.0 in) and diameters of 2 to 15 cm (0.79 to 5.91 in), featuring a green epidermis and slightly branched roots with a thickened taproot. The stems display 10 to 14 well-defined ribs, each divided into rounded tubercles. These tubercles bear 2 to 5 oval to elliptical areoles, which are not sunken and are covered in abundant, beige to white pubescence measuring 0.5 to 1.4 mm (0.020 to 0.055 in) long and 0.4 mm (0.016 in) wide. The cactus has gray to yellow radial spines, numbering 7 to 12 and arranged in approximately three pairs per areole, each measuring 1 to 2.5 cm (0.39 to 0.98 in) in length; it lacks a central spine. Adult plants develop a woolly cephalium at their apex, measuring 0.6 to 2 cm (0.24 to 0.79 in) in height and 2.6 to 3 cm (1.0 to 1.2 in) in diameter. This structure, composed of white to grayish wool with sparse or absent bristles at its margin, serves to protect the plant's sensitive apex from cold and intense ultraviolet radiation, and is also thought to attract pollinators due to its conspicuousness before flowering. The white, funnel-shaped flowers are fragrant and emerge from the edge of the cephalium, opening at night and attracting moth pollinators. They measure 3.4 to 3.6 cm (1.3 to 1.4 in) in length and 2.3 to 2.6 cm (0.91 to 1.02 in) in diameter. The pericarpel is bare at the base with few scales in its upper axils, while the slender floral tube, 2 to 8 mm (0.079 to 0.315 in) long, has cream to white scales. The inner perianth segments are 1.5 to 2.2 cm (0.59 to 0.87 in) long and white, and the outer segments are 1 to 2.4 cm (0.39 to 0.94 in) long and cream to white. The stamens have filaments 1 to 2 mm (0.039 to 0.079 in) long, the style is 1.2 to 1.8 cm (0.47 to 0.71 in) long, and the stigma has up to five lobes. Flowering occurs between November and March. The fruits are pinkish to reddish, club-shaped, and split longitudinally when mature, retaining persistent floral remnants. They can reach up to 3.5 cm (1.4 in) in length and about 0.5 cm (0.20 in) in width, containing approximately 100 shiny, oval-shaped black seeds. These seeds, measuring 1.1 mm (0.043 in) long, have a seed coat covered with small, elongated tubercles.

== Distribution ==
Discocactus petr-halfarii is native to northeastern Brazil, specifically in the state of Bahia, where it is found in the seasonally dry tropical biome. It grows in clay and rocky soils at elevations ranging from 350 to 550 meters.

== Taxonomy ==
This species was described by Milan Zachar and first published in Kaktusy: Zpravodaj Svazu českých kaktusářů in 2008. The specific epithet honors Petr Halfar, son of one of the cactus's discoverers, Miroslav Halfar.
