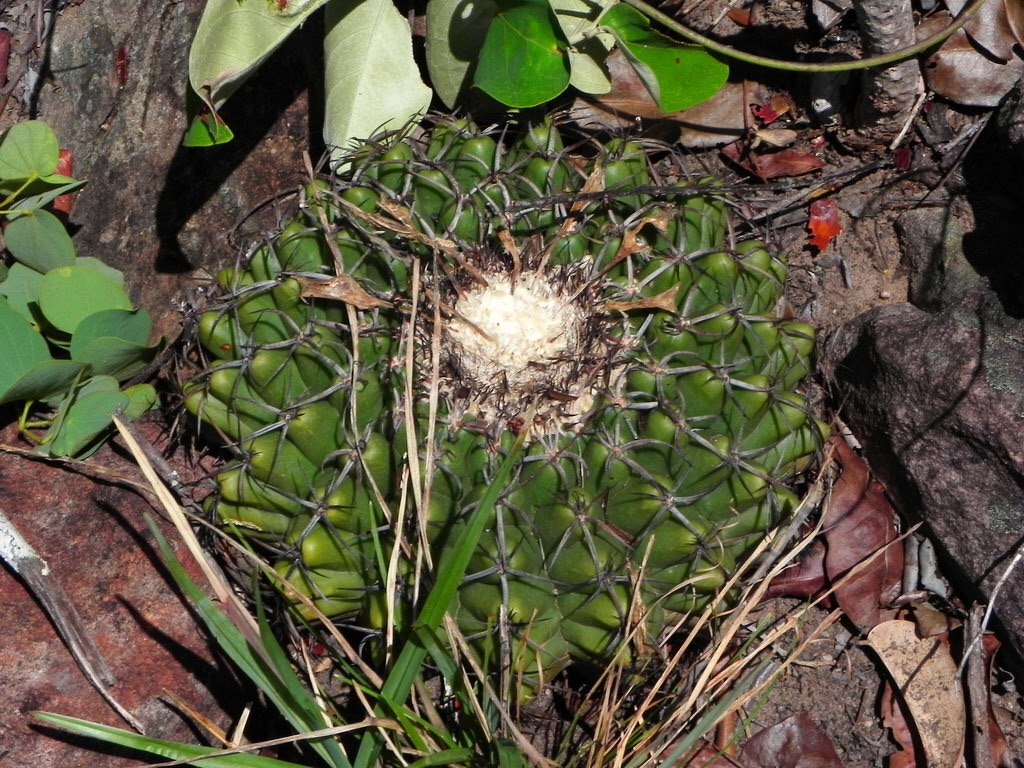

Conservation status
- Critically Endangered (IUCN 3.1)

Scientific classification
- Kingdom: Plantae
- Clade: Tracheophytes
- Clade: Angiosperms
- Clade: Eudicots
- Order: Caryophyllales
- Family: Cactaceae
- Subfamily: Cactoideae
- Genus: Discocactus
- Species: D. fariae-peresii

Binomial name
- Discocactus fariae-peresii P.J.Braun

= Discocactus fariae-peresii =

Species of tropical cacti

Discocactus fariae-peresii is a species of Discocactus found in Brazil.

== Description ==
This species is characterized by its flattened-globular or discoid stems, which reach 16 to 22 cm in diameter and have a yellowish-green epidermis. The stems are adorned with 17 to 23 distinct, vertically arranged ribs bearing well-developed tubercles. Circular, sunken areoles sit atop these tubercles, above ground level. While there are no central spines, the plant features 6 to 8 radial spines that can grow 10 to 25 cm long. Adult plants develop a distinctive cushion-shaped, woolly cephalium at their apex, composed of white wool with black bristles along its edge. This cephalium serves to protect the plant's sensitive tip from cold and intense UV radiation, and its conspicuousness even before flowering suggests it may also attract pollinators. The white, funnel-shaped flowers of Discocactus fariae-peresii are sweetly scented and emerge from the edge of the cephalium, opening at night to be pollinated by moths. These flowers measure 8 to 12 cm long and 6 to 8 cm in diameter, with narrow petals. The pericarpel is bare at the base and scaled towards the top, lacking wool and hairs. Ripe fruits, up to 3.5 cm long, split vertically and retain persistent floral remnants. They contain shiny black seeds, each up to 2 mm long, with a strongly tuberculate testa.

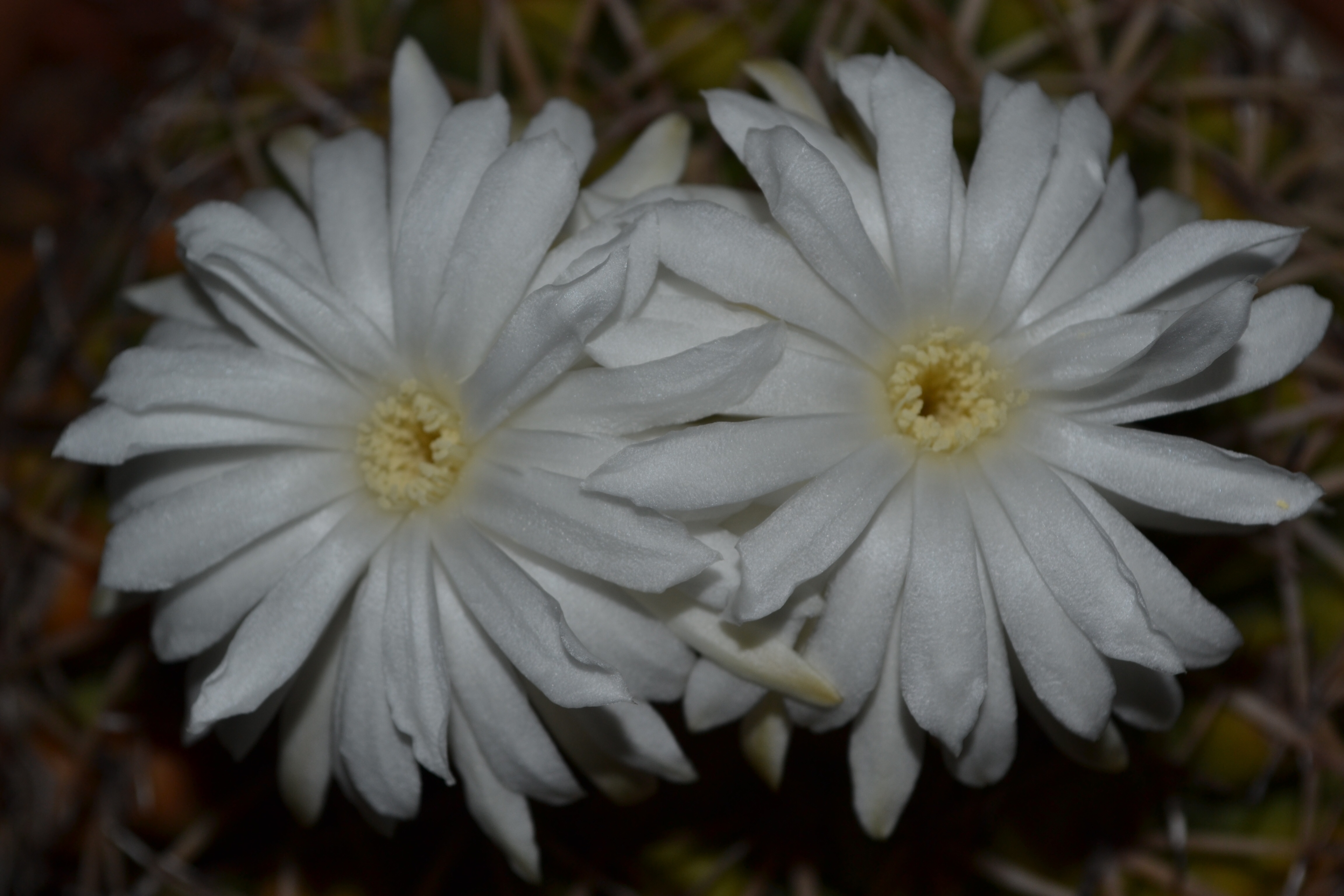
Flowers

== Distribution ==
Discocactus fariae-peresii is a small, solitary cactus found in west-central Brazil, specifically in the seasonally dry tropical biome of Goiás, growing among rocks and sandy soils.

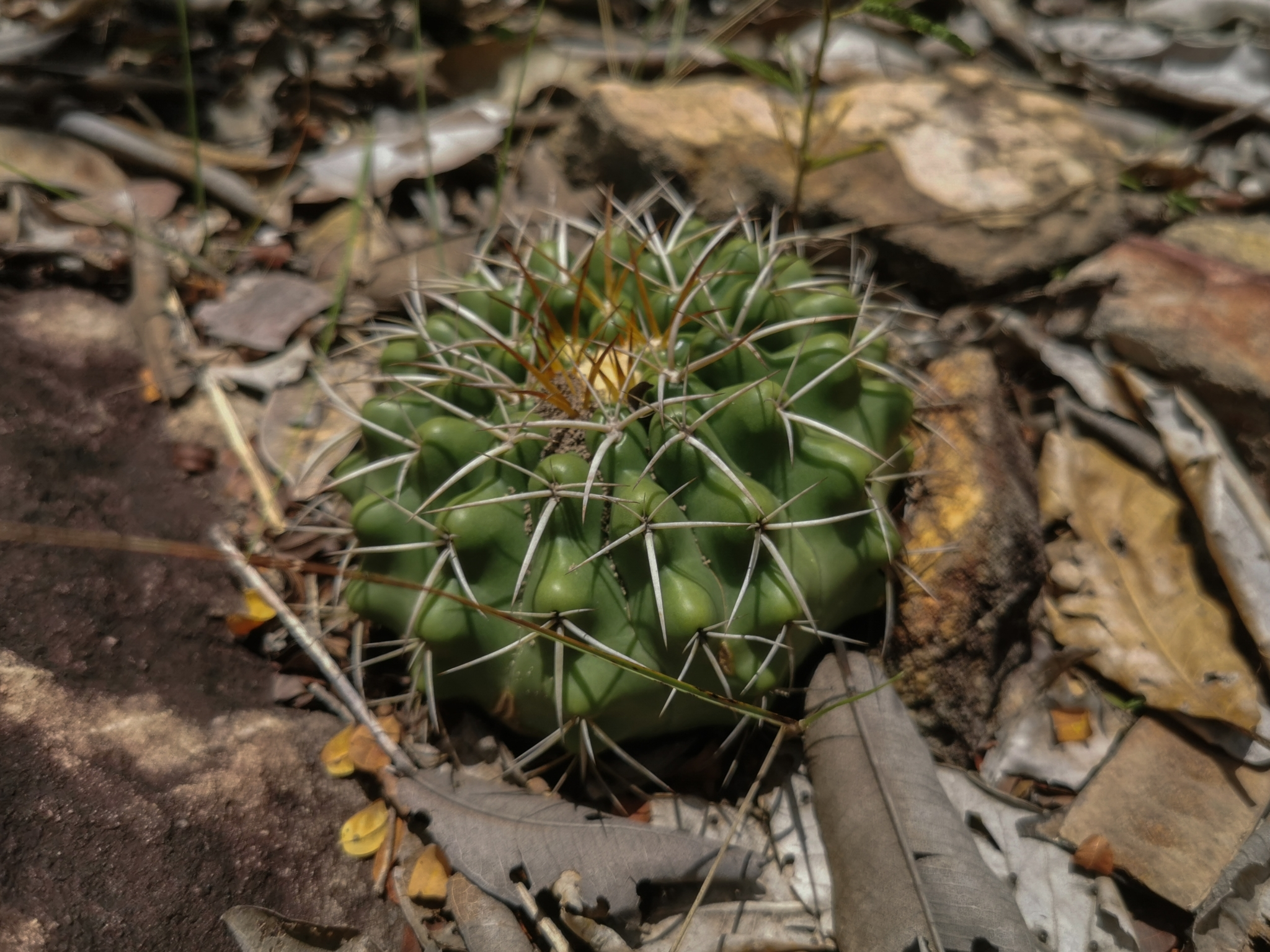
Plant growing in Planaltina, State of Goiás, Brazil

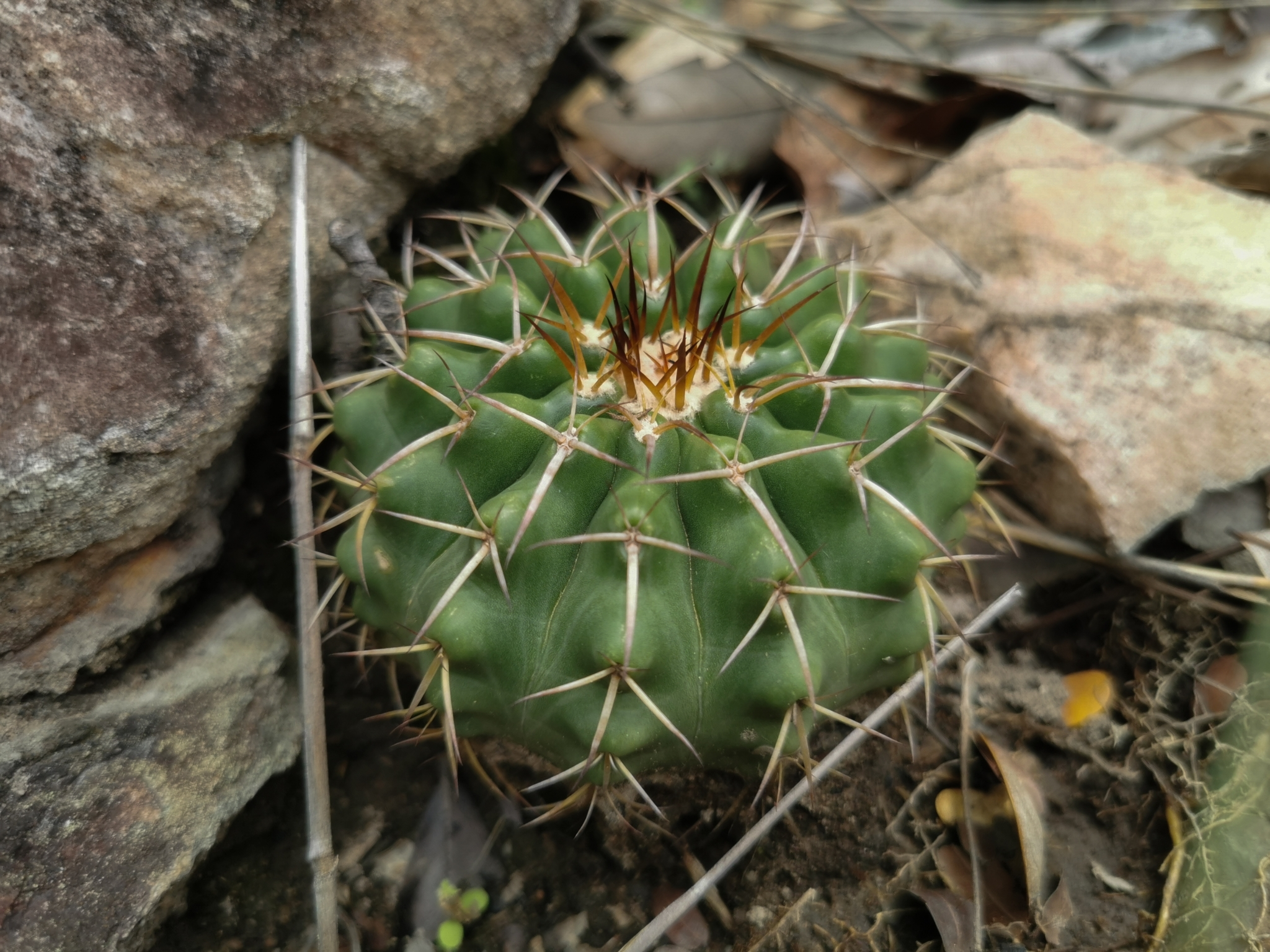
Plant growing in São Gabriel de Goiás, Planaltina - State of Goiás, Brazil

== Taxonomy ==
First described by Pierre Josef Braun in 2016 in the journal Kakteen und andere Sukkulenten, the species was named in honor of its discoverers, Brazilians Bento Paschoal de Faria and Adilson Peres.
