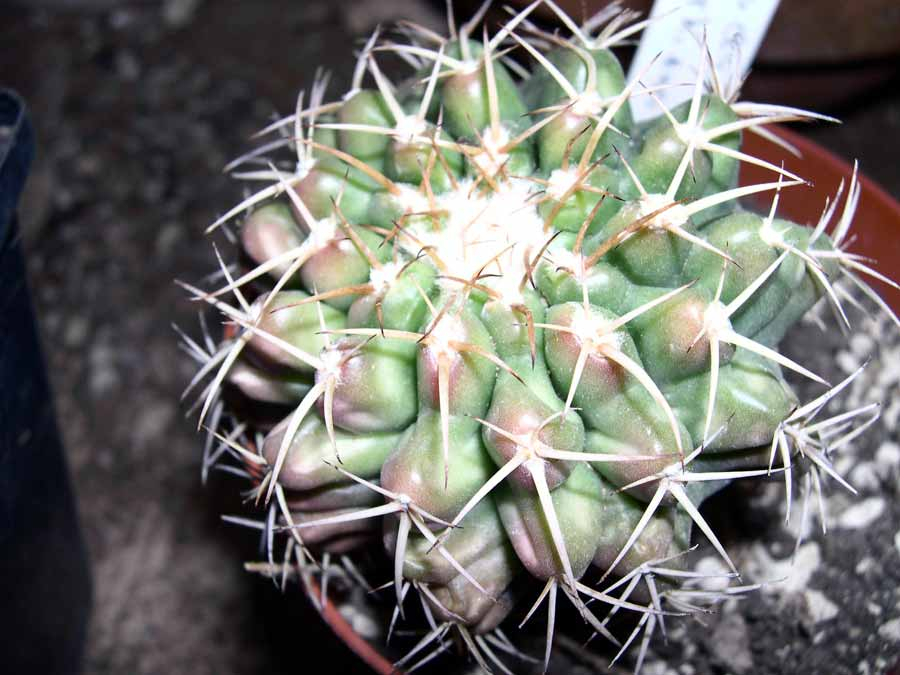

Conservation status
- Least Concern (IUCN 3.1)

Scientific classification
- Kingdom: Plantae
- Clade: Tracheophytes
- Clade: Angiosperms
- Clade: Eudicots
- Order: Caryophyllales
- Family: Cactaceae
- Subfamily: Cactoideae
- Genus: Discocactus
- Species: D. catingicola

Binomial name
- Discocactus catingicola Buining & Brederoo

Synonyms
- Discocactus heptacanthus subsp. catingicola (Buining & Brederoo) N.P.Taylor & Zappi 1997; Discocactus catingicola var. nigrisaetosus (Buining & Brederoo) P.Braun & Esteves 1993; Discocactus catingicola subsp. rapirhizus (Buining & Brederoo) P.Braun & Esteves 1993; Discocactus nigrisaetosus Buining & Brederoo 1976; Discocactus piauiensis P.J.Braun & Esteves 1995; Discocactus rapirhizus Buining & Brederoo 1975; Discocactus spinosior Buining & Brederoo 1976

= Discocactus catingicola =

Species of cactus

Discocactus catingicola is a species of Discocactus found in Brazil.

== Description ==
The stem is flattened-globular, measuring 3 to 9 cm (1.2 to 3.5 in) tall and 8 to 20 cm (3.1 to 7.9 in) in diameter, with a dark olive-green epidermis and branched roots. It features 9 to 13 well-defined ribs that are arranged vertically or slightly spirally and divided into non-flattened tubercles. 3-6 Oval to elongated areoles per rib are sunken on these tubercles, each bearing spines. The spines are yellow to gray, sometimes with darker bands, and can be straight or slightly curved. They typically consist of a single central spine 0.8 to 2 cm (0.31 to 0.79 in), sometimes absent and 3 to 10 radial spines that are 0.2 to 3.6 cm (0.079 to 1.417 in) long. Adult plants develop a woolly cephalium at their apex, measuring 2 to 7.5 cm (0.79 to 2.95 in) in height and 0.5 to 4.5 cm (0.20 to 1.77 in) in diameter. This structure, composed of white wool with occasional gray or black bristles that are 1.5 to 5 cm (0.59 to 1.97 in), protects the plant from cold and intense UV radiation, and is believed to attract pollinators.

The fragrant, white, tubular flowers emerge from the cephalium's edge, opening at night and pollinated by moths. They measure 4.8 to 7 cm (1.9 to 2.8 in) long and 3.5 to 6 cm (1.4 to 2.4 in) in diameter, with olive-green buds. The floral tube is thin and white with light olive-green tips, bearing fleshy scales. Inner perianth segments are about 1.6 to 2.5 cm (0.63 to 0.98 in) long, and outer ones are 1.6 to 3 cm (0.63 to 1.18 in) long, both white. Stamens have filaments of 0.5 to 1.7 cm (0.20 to 0.67 in) and yellow anthers that are 1–2.5 mm (0.039–0.098 in). The style is 3.6 to 4.5 cm (1.4 to 1.8 in) long, with a 4 to 6-lobed stigma. The ovary contains ovules arranged in bundles of 1 to 5. This species does not produce offsets.

The club-shaped fruits are white to green at the apex, measuring 6 to 8 cm (2.4 to 3.1 in) long and 2.5 to 4.5 cm (0.98 to 1.77 in) wide. They split open vertically at maturity, retaining persistent floral remnants, and contain shiny black, oval seeds 1.1–2 mm (0.043–0.079 in) with numerous nipple-shaped tubercles on their testa.

== Distribution ==
Discocactus catingicola is a small, solitary cactus native to eastern Goiás and central Bahia in Brazil. It is found growing in seasonally dry tropical biomes, typically near rivers on exposed sandy or rocky soils, at elevations of 450 to 700 meters.

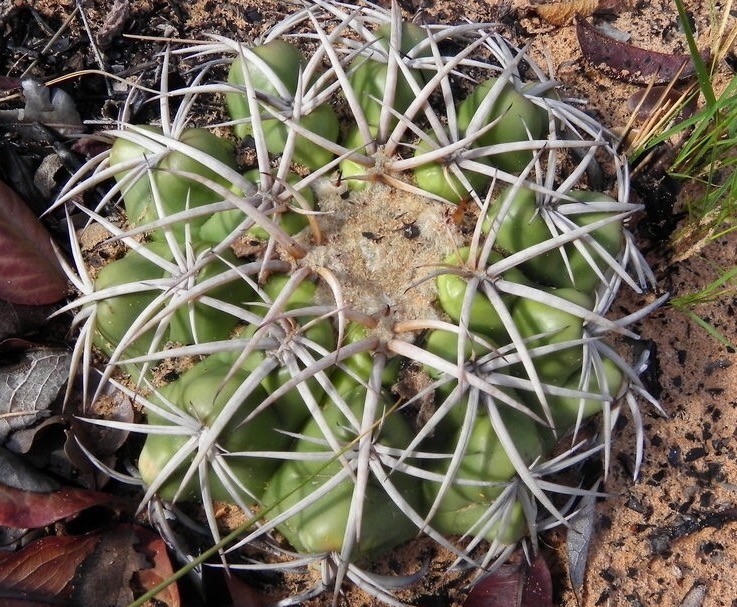
Discocactus catingicola in sand, Bahia, Brasil

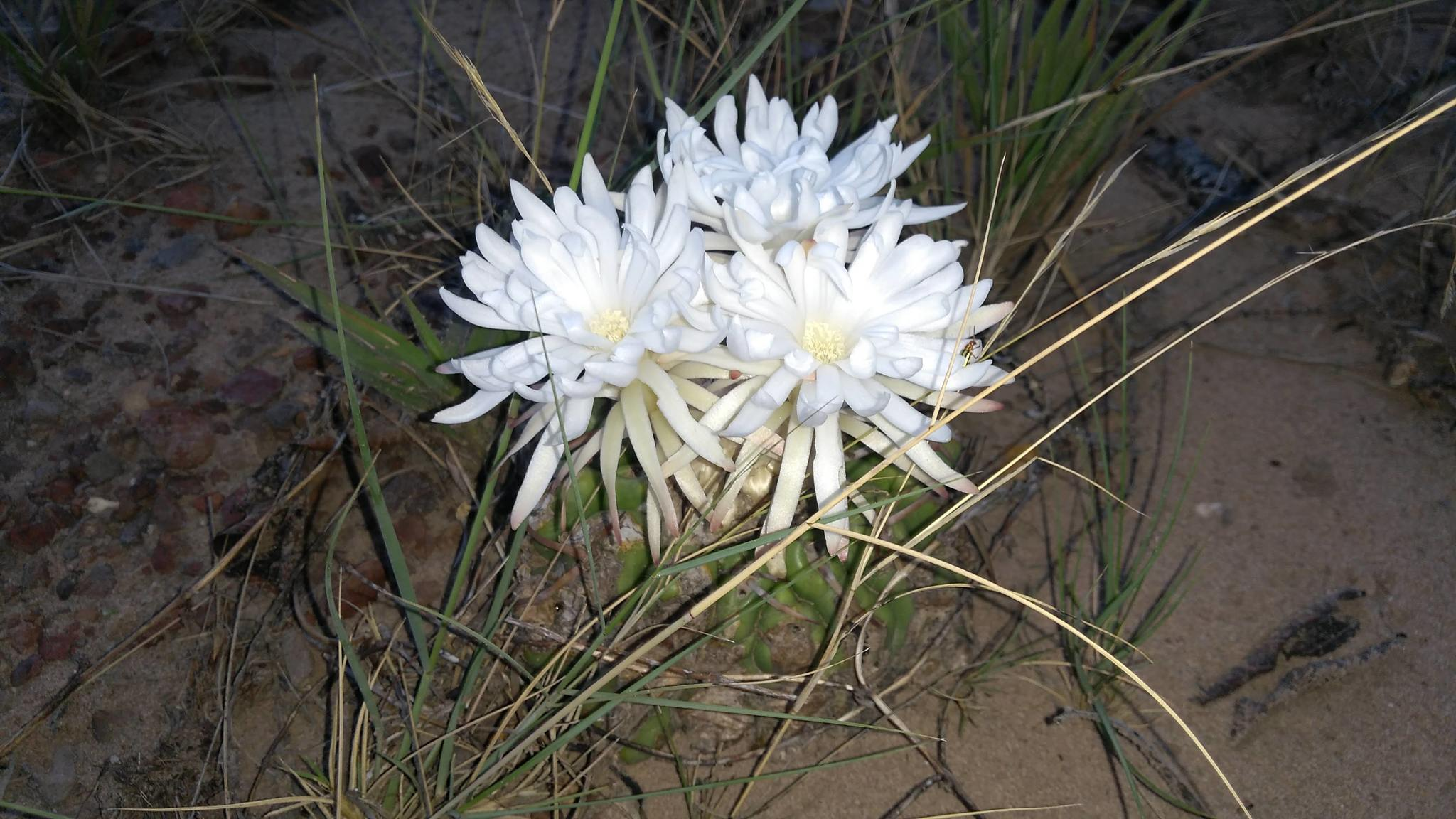
Plant blooming in Nova Roma, State of Goiás, Brazil

== Taxonomy ==
Discocactus catingicola was first published in 1974 by Albert Frederik Hendrik Buining and A.J. Brederoo in the scientific journal Kakteen und andere Sukkulenten 25: 265 in 1974.. The specific epithet "catingicola" refers to its habitat in the Caatinga region of northeastern Brazil.
