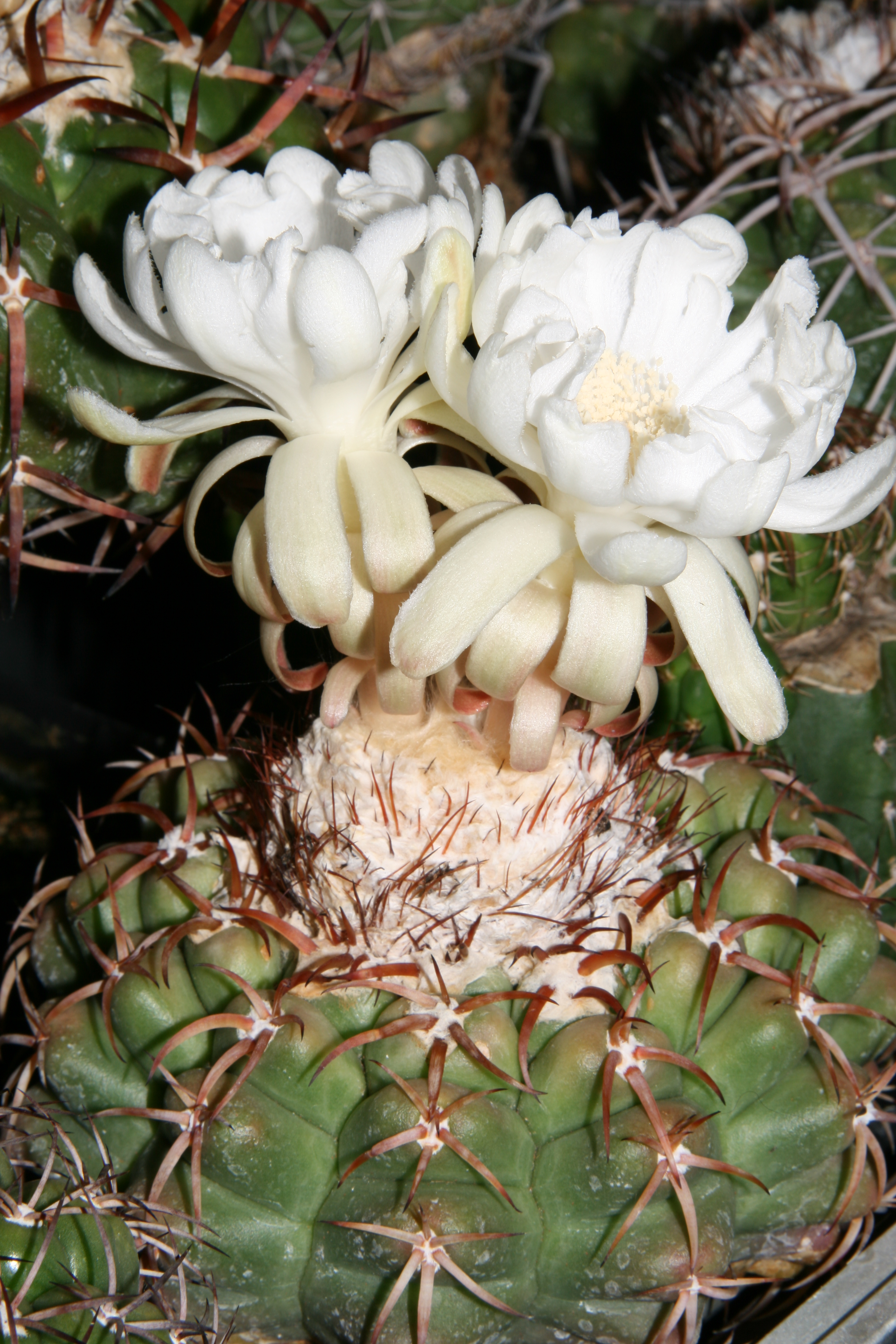

Conservation status
- Near Threatened (IUCN 3.1)

Scientific classification
- Kingdom: Plantae
- Clade: Tracheophytes
- Clade: Angiosperms
- Clade: Eudicots
- Order: Caryophyllales
- Family: Cactaceae
- Subfamily: Cactoideae
- Genus: Discocactus
- Species: D. heptacanthus

Binomial name
- Discocactus heptacanthus (Barb.Rodr.) Britton & Rose

Synonyms
- Discocactus cangaensis Diers & Esteves, 1980; Discocactus catingicola var. griseus (Buining & Brederoo) P.Braun & Esteves, 1993; Discocactus catingicola subsp. griseus (Buining & Brederoo) P.J.Braun & Esteves, 1995; Discocactus crassispinus P.J.Braun & Esteves, 1994; Discocactus crassispinus subsp. araguaiensis P.J.Braun & Esteves, 1996; Discocactus diersianus var. goianus (Diers & Esteves) P.Braun & Esteves, 1993; Discocactus diersianus subsp. goianus (Diers & Esteves) P.J.Braun & Esteves, 1995; Discocactus estevesii Diers, 1978; Discocactus flavispinus Buining & Brederoo, 1976; Discocactus goianus Diers & Esteves, 1980; Discocactus griseus Buining & Brederoo, 1975; Discocactus hartmannii subsp. setosiflorus P.Braun & Esteves, 1994; Discocactus heptacanthus subsp. goiasensis P.J.Braun, 2019; Discocactus heptacanthus subsp. melanochlorus (Buining & Brederoo) P.J.Braun & Esteves, 1993; Discocactus heptacanthus var. semicampaniflorus (Buining & Brederoo) P.J.Braun & Esteves, 1993; Discocactus lindanus Diers & Esteves, 1981; Discocactus melanochlorus Buining & Brederoo, 1976; Discocactus paranaensis Backeb., 1960; Discocactus prominentigibbus Diers & Esteves, 1988; Discocactus semicampaniflorus Buining & Brederoo, 1975; Discocactus silvaticus Buining & Brederoo, 1976; Discocactus squamibaccatus Buining & Brederoo, 1976; Discocactus subterraneo-proliferans Diers & Esteves, 1980; Malacocarpus heptacanthus Barb.Rodr., 1898; Neodiscocactus heptacanthus (Barb.Rodr.) Y.Itô, 1981

= Discocactus heptacanthus =

Species of tropical cacti

Discocactus heptacanthus is a species of Discocactus found in Brazil, Bolivia, and Paraguay.

== Description ==
Discocactus heptacanthus is a small, solitary cactus characterized by its discoid to nearly globular shape. Its stems, reaching 3 to 9 cm (1.2 to 3.5 in) in height and 8 to 16 cm (3.1 to 6.3 in) in diameter, possess a pale green to olive epidermis and branched roots. The plant features 9 to 16 prominent, vertically or slightly spirally arranged ribs, which are grooved between the areoles, creating flattened, nipple-shaped tubercles. Each rib bears 2 to 6 oval, sunken areoles, measuring 3 to 8 mm (0.12 to 0.31 in) long and 2 to 7 mm (0.079 to 0.276 in) wide. The spines vary in color from pale yellow to gray or brown. They are straight or slightly curved and typically consist of a single central spine, 1.5 to 2.4 cm (0.59 to 0.94 in) long, though this may be absent. Additionally, 3 to 9 radial spines, measuring 0.3 to 3.5 cm (0.12 to 1.38 in) long, are present. Mature plants develop a woolly cephalium at their apex, a structure 1 to 2.7 cm (0.39 to 1.06 in) high and 2.5 to 6 cm (0.98 to 2.36 in) in diameter. This cephalium, composed of white to dull pastel wool and occasional brown or black bristles up to 5 cm (2.0 in) long, protects the plant's sensitive tip from cold and intense ultraviolet radiation. It is also thought to attract pollinators and is conspicuous even before flowering. The fragrant, white flowers are tubular to funnel-shaped, emerging from the cephalium's edge. They open at night, are pollinated by moths, and measure 5.2 to 11 cm (2.0 to 4.3 in) in length and 4.5 to 7 cm (1.8 to 2.8 in) in diameter. The flower buds are olive green. The naked ovary at the base of the flower is adorned with few naked scales, while the slender floral tube, 4.4 to 7 cm (1.7 to 2.8 in) long, has white scales, with brownish-green ones on the central vein and apex. The inner and outer perianth segments are white, measuring 2.2 to 2.7 cm (0.87 to 1.06 in) and 2.3 to 3 cm (0.91 to 1.18 in) respectively. The stamens have 0.2 to 2 cm (0.079 to 0.787 in) long filaments supporting 1 to 2 mm (0.039 to 0.079 in) long yellow anthers. The style extends 4.4 to 7.6 cm (1.7 to 3.0 in), culminating in a 4 to 7-lobed stigma containing ovules arranged in groups of 4 to 5. Fruits are club-shaped, white with a greenish-pink apex, measuring 2.5 to 4.2 cm (0.98 to 1.65 in) long and 0.6 to 1.2 cm (0.24 to 0.47 in) wide. They split longitudinally at maturity, retaining persistent floral remnants. Within, shiny, oval black seeds, 1.1 to 2 mm (0.043 to 0.079 in) long, are found, distinguished by a testa covered in numerous nipple-shaped tubercles.

== Distribution ==
This species is native to central-western Brazil, extending from Goiás, Mato Grosso, Mato Grosso do Sul, Pará, Rondônia, to Tocantins, Eastrern Bolivia, and Paraguay. It primarily grows at low elevations within the seasonally dry tropical biome, preferring exposed, iron-rich gravelly soils. Occasionally, it can also be found on sandy or quartz gravel, as well as on granite and sandstone outcrops.

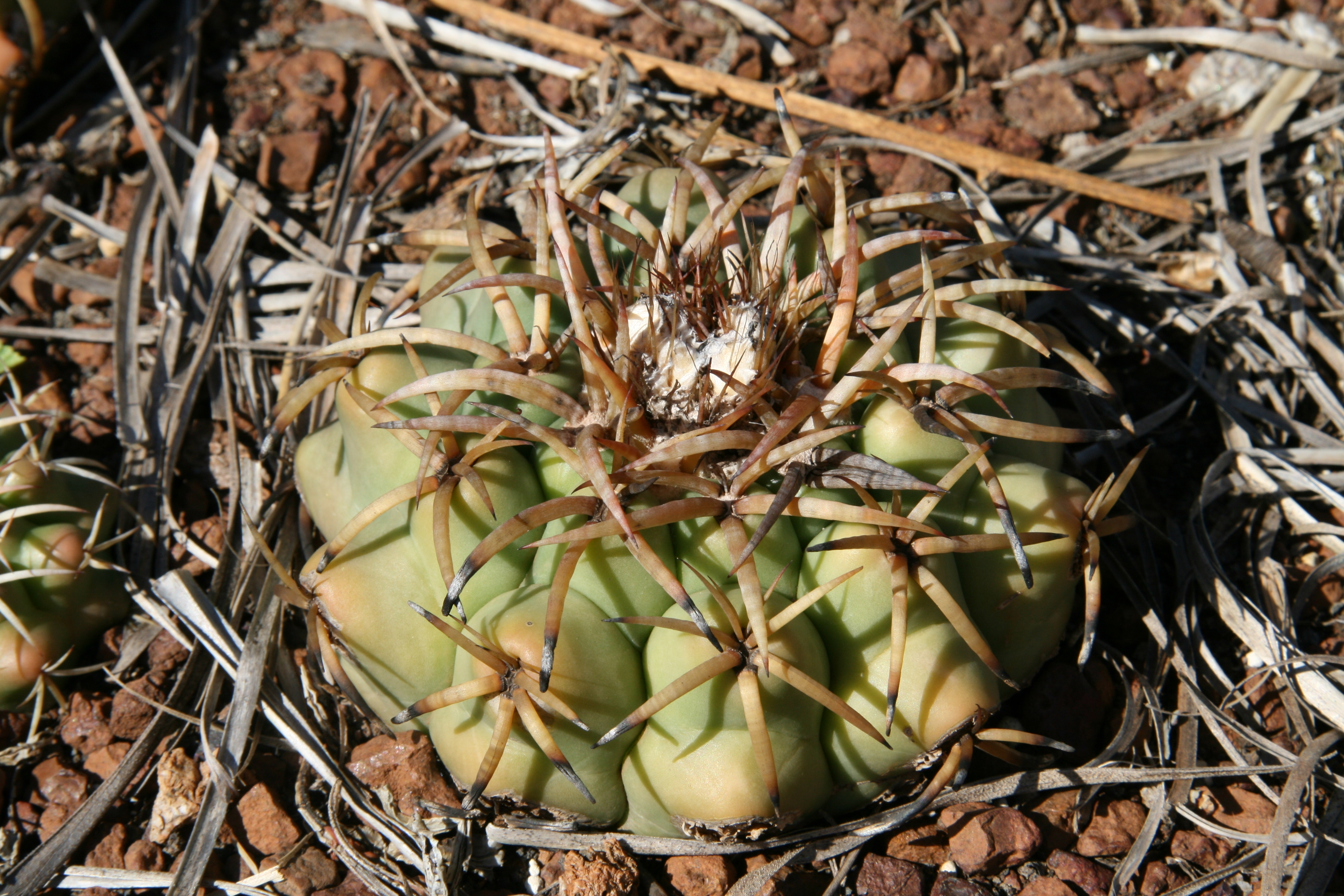
Plant growing in habitat in Goiás

== Taxonomy ==
Originally described as Malacocarpus heptacanthus in 1898 by João Barbosa Rodrigues, it was later transferred to the genus Discocactus by Nathaniel Lord Britton and Joseph Nelson Rose in 1922. The specific epithet "heptacanthus" originates from the Greek words "hepta" (seven) and "akantha" (spine), referencing the usual number of spines on its areoles.
