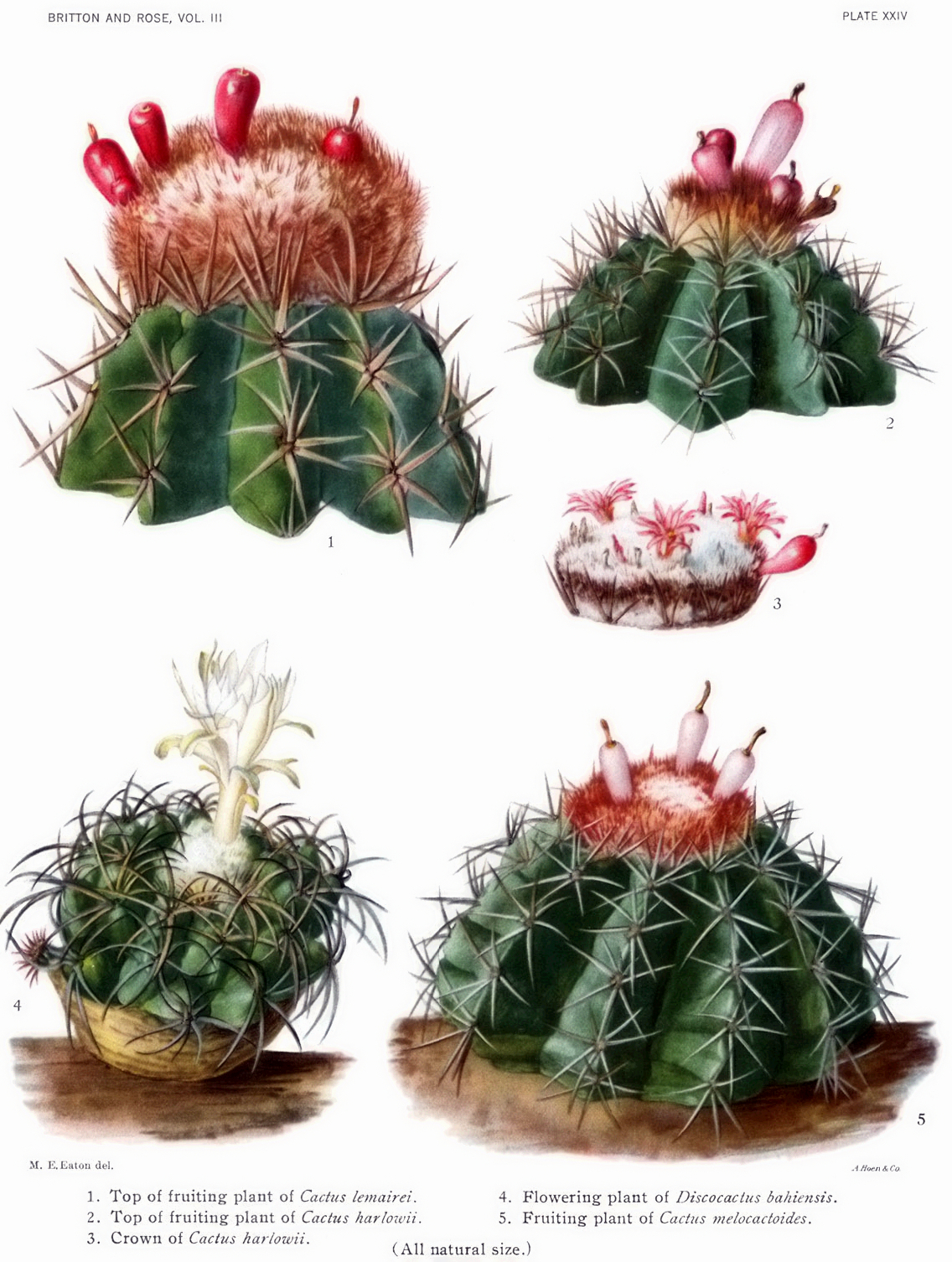
- Discocactus bahiensis (lower left)

Conservation status
- CITES Appendix I

Scientific classification
- Kingdom: Plantae
- Clade: Tracheophytes
- Clade: Angiosperms
- Clade: Eudicots
- Order: Caryophyllales
- Family: Cactaceae
- Subfamily: Cactoideae
- Tribe: Cereeae
- Subtribe: Cereinae
- Genus: Discocactus; Pfeiff.

Type species
- Discocactus placentiformis

Species
- See text.

Synonyms
- Neodiscocactus Y.Itô, without full replaced synonym ref.

= Discocactus =

Genus of cacti

Discocactus is a genus of tropical cacti. Discocactus plants are endemic to southern Brazil, eastern Bolivia, and northern Paraguay. These species are in the risk of extinction in the wild.

== Description ==
The species of the genus Discocactus are depressed spherical to spherical and usually solitary plants, with mostly numerous, at the base somewhat broadened ribs and well-developed warts. The areoles are usually covered by strong thorns. At the apex of the adult plants, there is a wooly cephalium, white or shaded with yellow or grey. The terminal cephalium, up to 4 centimeters high, is slightly depressed. It consists of white, yellowish to grayish white wool and may have bristly spines.

The fragrant, white, funnel- or tray-shaped flowers arise at the edge of the cephalium and open at night. Their pericarpel, glabrous at the base, is covered with scales higher up. There is no wool or hair. The slender flower-tube is also covered with scales.

The spherical to club-shaped to oblong, white to pink to bright red fruits are glabrous and slightly fleshy. They open at a vertical slit and have a perennial flower remnant. The fruits contain broadly oval to almost spherical, shiny black seeds that are 2 to 2.5 millimeters long.

== Taxonomy ==
The genus was first described in 1837 by Ludwig Georg Karl Pfeiffer. The name comes from the ancient Greek diskos (=disc) because of its shape.

=== Species ===
All species are listed under Appendix I of CITES meaning commercial international trade is prohibited and non-commercial international trade is regulated.

As of September 2023, Plants of the World Online accepted the following species:

Image	Scientific name	Distribution
	Discocactus bahiensis Britton & Rose	Brazil (Bahia, Ceará, Pernambuco, and Piauí)
	Discocactus boliviensis Buining & Brederoo	Bolivia (Santa Cruz)
	Discocactus buenekeri W.R.Abraham	Brazil (Bahia)
	Discocactus catingicola Buining & Brederoo	Brazil (Mato Grosso)
	Discocactus diersianus Esteves	Brazil (Goiás)
	Discocactus fariae-peresii P.J.Braun	Brazil (Goiás)
	Discocactus ferricola Buining & Brederoo	Bolivia to Brazil (Mato Grosso do Sul)
	Discocactus hartmannii (K.Schum.) Britton & Rose	Paraguay to Brazil (Goiás, Mato Grosso do Sul)
	Discocactus heptacanthus (Barb.Rodr.) Britton & Rose	Bolivia (Chuquisaca, Santa Cruz, Tarija), Brazil (Bahia, Goias, Mato Grosso, Mato Grosso do Sul, Minas Gerais), Paraguay (Alto Paraguay, Alto Parana, Amambay, Boqueron, Caaguazu, Caazapa, Canindeyu, Central Departemento, Concepcion, Cordillera, Guaira, Itapua, Misiones (Departamento), Neembucu, Paraguari, Presidente Hayes, San Pedro)
	Discocactus horstii Buining & Brederoo	Brazil (Minas Gerais: Mun. Grão-Mogol)
	Discocactus petr-halfarii Zachar	Brazil (Bahia)
	Discocactus placentiformis (Lehm.) K.Schum.	Brazil (Minas Gerais)
	Discocactus pseudoinsignis N.P.Taylor & Zappi	Brazil (Minas Gerais)
	Discocactus zehntneri Britton & Rose	Brazil (Bahia)

== Bibliography ==
- Edward F. Anderson : The Cactus Family. Timber Press: Portland (Oregon), 2001, p. 218-221 ISBN 0-88192-498-9
- N. L. Britton, J. N. Rose: The Cactaceae. Descriptions and Illustrations of Plants of the Cactus Family. Washington, 1920
