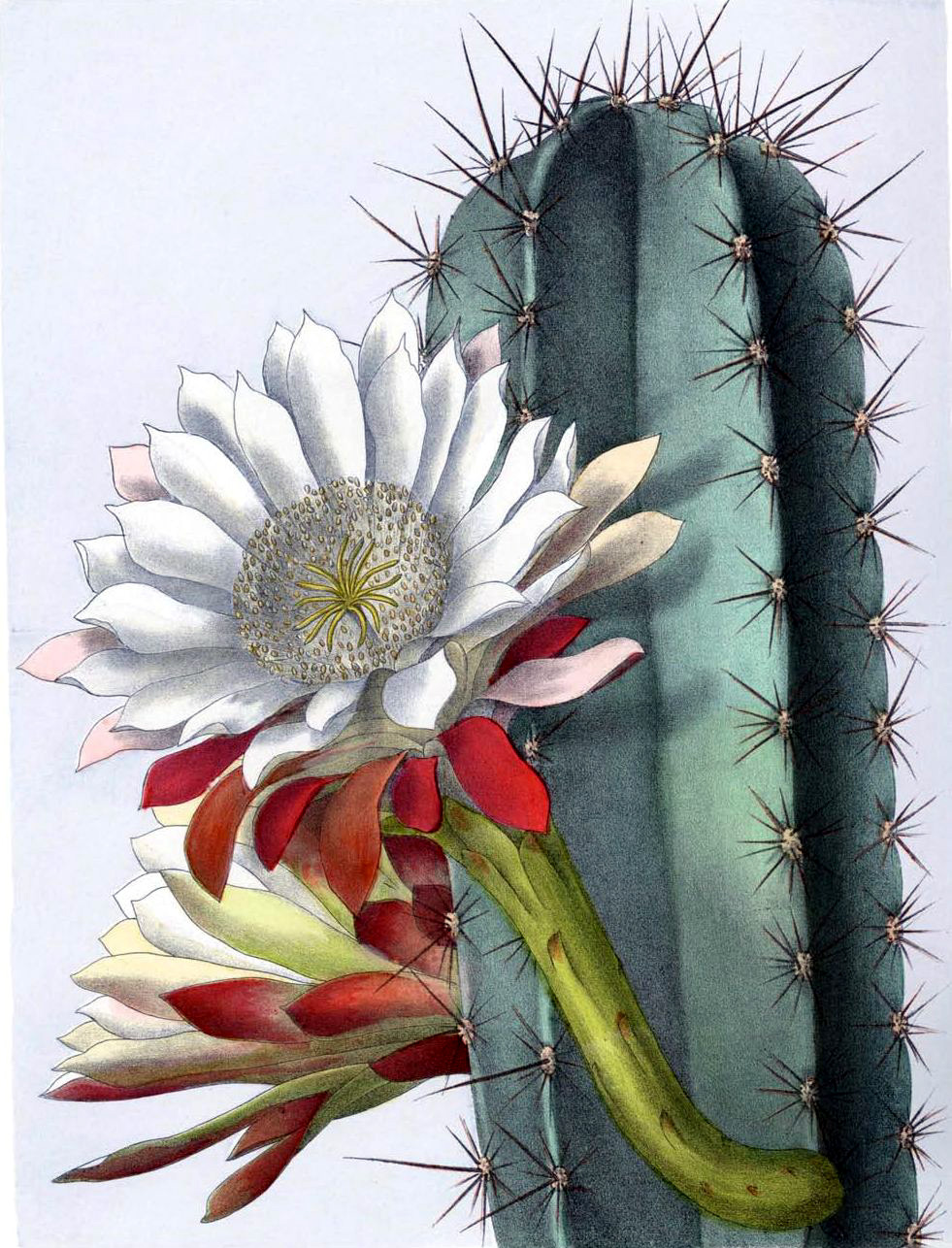
- Cereus repandus

Scientific classification
- Kingdom: Plantae
- Clade: Tracheophytes
- Clade: Angiosperms
- Clade: Eudicots
- Order: Caryophyllales
- Family: Cactaceae
- Subfamily: Cactoideae
- Tribe: Cereeae
- Subtribe: Cereinae; Britton & Rose

Type genus
- Cereus

Genera
- See text.

= Cereinae =

Subtribe of cacti

Cereinae is a subtribe of cacti in the tribe Cereeae, subfamily Cactoideae. It is one of the six subtribes into which the tribe Cereeae was divided in 2023, the others being the monotypic Aylosterinae, Gymnocalyciinae, and Uebelmanniinae, along with Rebutiinae and Trichocereinae.

== Genera ==
14 genera were firmly included in subtribe Cereinae in a 2021 study. This included Stephanocereus, treated as a synonym of Arrojadoa by Plants of the World Online as of September 2023. Espostoopsis was not included in the 2021 study, but was noted to have been placed in Cereinae in many previous studies, including that by Lendel in 2013. Serrulatocereus was also not included in the 2021 study. It may not be distinct from Cereus as molecular phylogenetic studies have placed it in that genus, a placement accepted by some sources. A 2023 molecular phylogenetic study found that Stetsonia, formerly placed in subtribe Rebutiinae, belonged in Cereinae.

| Image | Genus | Living species |
|---|---|---|
| | Arrojadoa Britton & Rose, (1920) | Arrojadoa albiflora; Arrojadoa dinae; Arrojadoa eriocaulis Buining & Brederoo; Arrojadoa marylanae; Arrojadoa multiflora F.Ritter; Arrojadoa olsthoorniana Hofacker, M.Machado & R.Pontes; Arrojadoa penicillata; Arrojadoa rhodantha |
| | Bragaia Esteves, Hofacker & P.J.Braun | Bragaia estevesii |
| | Brasilicereus Backeb. | Brasilicereus markgrafii Backeb. & Voll; Brasilicereus phaeacanthus (Gürke) Backeb. |
| | Cereus Mill. | 25 species: Cereus aethiops Haw.; Cereus bicolor Rizzini & A.Mattos; Cereus fernambucensis Lem.; Cereus forbesii C.F.Först.; Cereus fricii Backeb.; Cereus hexagonus (L.) Mill.; Cereus hildmannianus K.Schum.; Cereus horrispinus Backeb.; Cereus insularis Hemsl.; Cereus jamacaru DC.; Cereus lamprospermus K.Schum.; Cereus lanosus (F.Ritter) P.J.Braun; Cereus lepidotus Salm-Dyck; Cereus mortensenii (Croizat) D.R.Hunt & N.P.Taylor; Cereus pachyrrhizus K.Schum.; Cereus phatnospermus K.Schum.; Cereus pierre-braunianus Esteves; Cereus repandus (L.) Mill.; Cereus saddianus (Rizzini & A.Mattos) P.J.Braun; Cereus spegazzinii F.A.C.Weber; Cereus stenogonus K.Schum.; Cereus trigonodendron K.Schum. ex Vaupel; Cereus vargasianus Cárdenas; Cereus yungasensis A.Fuentes & Quispe |
| | Cipocereus F.Ritter | Cipocereus bradei; Cipocereus crassisepalus; Cipocereus laniflorus; Cipocereus minensis; Cipocereus pleurocarpus |
| | Coleocephalocereus Backeb. | Coleocephalocereus aureus F.Ritter; Coleocephalocereus buxbaumianus Buining; Coleocephalocereus buxbaumianus subsp. buxbaumianus.; Coleocephalocereus buxbaumianus subsp. flavisetus (F.Ritter) N.P.Taylor & Zappi; Coleocephalocereus fluminensis (Miq.) Backeb.; Coleocephalocereus fluminensis subsp. fluminensis; Coleocephalocereus fluminensis subsp. decumbens (F.Ritter) N.P.Taylor & Zappi; Coleocephalocereus goebelianus (Vaupel) Buining; Coleocephalocereus pluricostatus Buining & Brederoo; Coleocephalocereus purpureus (Buining & Brederoo) F.Ritter |
| | Discocactus Pfeiff. 1837 | Discocactus bahiensis Britton & Rose; Discocactus boliviensis Backeb. ex Buining; Discocactus buenekeri W.R.Abraham; Discocactus catingicola Buining & Brederoo; Discocactus diersianus Esteves Pereira; Discocactus fariae-peresii P.J.Braun; Discocactus ferricola Buining & Brederoo; Discocactus hartmannii (K.Schum.) Britton & Rose; Discocactus heptacanthus (Barb.Rodr.) Britton & Rose; Discocactus horstii Buining & Brederoo; Discocactus petr-halfarii Zachar; Discocactus placentiformis (Lehm.) K.Schum.; Discocactus pseudoinsignis N.P.Taylor & Zappi; Discocactus zehntneri Britton & Rose |
| | Espostoopsis Buxb. 1968 | Espostoopsis dybowskii (Rol.-Goss.) Buxb. |
| | Facheiroa Britton & Rose 1920 | Facheiroa bahiensis (Britton & Rose) N.P.Taylor; Facheiroa braunii Esteves; Facheiroa cephaliomelana Buining & Brederoo; Facheiroa squamosa (Gürke) P.J.Braun & Esteves; Facheiroa ulei (K.Schum.) Werderm. |
| | Floribunda F. Ritter | Floribunda pusilliflora F.Ritter |
| | Lagenosocereus Doweld | Lagenosocereus luetzelburgii(Vaupel) Doweld |
| | Melocactus Link & Otto | 52 species: Melocactus acunae León; Melocactus × albicephalus Buining & Brederoo; Melocactus andinus R.Gruber ex N.P.Taylor; Melocactus azureus Buining & Brederoo; Melocactus bahiensis (Britton & Rose) Luetzelb.; Melocactus bellavistensis Rauh & Backeb.; Melocactus braunii Esteves; Melocactus brederooanus Buining; Melocactus broadwayi (Britton & Rose) Houghton; Melocactus caroli-linnaei N.P.Taylor; Melocactus conoideus Buining & Brederoo; Melocactus curvispinus Pfeiff.; Melocactus deinacanthus Buining & Brederoo; Melocactus ernestii Vaupel; Melocactus estevesii P.J.Braun; Melocactus evae Z.Mészáros; Melocactus ferreophilus Buining & Brederoo; Melocactus glaucescens Buining & Brederoo; Melocactus harlowii (Britton & Rose) Vaupel; Melocactus heimenii P.J.Braun & Gonç.Brito; Melocactus holguinensis Areces; Melocactus × horridus Werderm.; Melocactus inconcinnus Buining & Brederoo; Melocactus intortus (Mill.) Urb.; Melocactus lagunaensis (Z.Mészáros) D.Barrios & Majure; Melocactus lanssensianus P.J.Braun; Melocactus lemairei (Monv. ex Lem.) Miq. ex Lem.; Melocactus levitestatus Buining & Brederoo; Melocactus macracanthos (Salm-Dyck) Link & Otto; Melocactus matanzanus León; Melocactus mazelianus Říha; Melocactus nagyi Z.Mészáros; Melocactus neoviridescens Guiggi; Melocactus neryi K.Schum.; Melocactus oreas Miq.; Melocactus pachyacanthus Buining & Brederoo; Melocactus paucispinus Heimen & R.J.Paul; Melocactus pedernalensis M.M.Mejía & R.G.García; Melocactus perezassoi Areces; Melocactus peruvianus Vaupel; Melocactus praerupticola Areces; Melocactus pruinosus Werderm.; Melocactus radoczii Z.Mészáros; Melocactus salvadorensis Werderm.; Melocactus santiagoensis D.Barrios & Majure; Melocactus schatzlii H.Till & R.Gruber; Melocactus sergipensis N.P.Taylor & Meiado; Melocactus smithii (Alexander) Buining ex G.D.Rowley; Melocactus stramineus Suringar; Melocactus × trachycephalus Suringar; Melocactus violaceus Pfeiff.; Melocactus zehntneri (Britton & Rose) Luetzelb. |
| | Monvillea | Monvillea amazonica; Monvillea diffusa; Monvillea euchlora; Monvillea jaenensis; Monvillea saxicola; Monvillea smithiana |
| | Micranthocereus Backeb. | Micranthocereus albicephalus (Buining & Brederoo) F.Ritter; Micranthocereus auri-azureus Buining & Brederoo; Micranthocereus dolichospermaticus (Buining & Brederoo) F.Ritter; Micranthocereus estevesii (Buining & Brederoo) F.Ritter; Micranthocereus flaviflorus Buining & Brederoo; Micranthocereus hofackerianus (P.J.Braun & Esteves) M.Machado; Micranthocereus polyanthus (Werderm.) Backeb.; Micranthocereus polyanthus subsp. alvinii M.Machado & Hofacker; Micranthocereus polyanthus subsp. polyanthus; Micranthocereus purpureus (Gürke) F.Ritter; Micranthocereus streckeri Van Heek & Van Criek.; Micranthocereus violaciflorus Buining – synonym of Viridicereus violaciflorus |
| | Pierrebraunia Esteves | Pierrebraunia bahiensis |
| | Pilosocereus Byles & G. D. Rowley | 51 species: Pilosocereus albisummus P.J.Braun & Esteves; Pilosocereus alensis (F.A.C.Weber) Byles & G.D.Rowley; Pilosocereus armatus (Otto ex Pfeiff.) A.R.Franck; Pilosocereus arrabidae (Lem.) Byles & G.D.Rowley; Pilosocereus aureispinus (Buining & Brederoo) F.Ritter; Pilosocereus aurilanatus F.Ritter; Pilosocereus aurisetus (Werderm.) Byles & G.D.Rowley; Pilosocereus azulensis N.P.Taylor & Zappi; Pilosocereus bohlei Hofacker; Pilosocereus brasiliensis (Britton & Rose) Backeb.; Pilosocereus brooksianus (Britton & Rose) Byles & G.D.Rowley; Pilosocereus catingicola (Gürke) Byles & G.D.Rowley; Pilosocereus chrysacanthus (F.A.C.Weber ex K.Schum.) Byles & G.D.Rowley; Pilosocereus chrysostele (Vaupel) Byles & G.D.Rowley; Pilosocereus collinsii (Britton & Rose) Byles & G.D.Rowley; Pilosocereus colombianus (Rose) Byles & G.D.Rowley; Pilosocereus curtisii (Otto) A.R.Franck; Pilosocereus densiareolatus F.Ritter; Pilosocereus diersianus (Esteves) P.J.Braun; Pilosocereus flavipulvinatus (Buining & Brederoo) F.Ritter; Pilosocereus flexibilispinus P.J.Braun & Esteves; Pilosocereus floccosus Byles & G.D.Rowley; Pilosocereus fulvilanatus (Buining & Brederoo) F.Ritter; Pilosocereus gaumeri (Britton & Rose) Backeb.; Pilosocereus glaucochrous (Werderm.) Byles & G.D.Rowley; Pilosocereus jamaicensis Proctor ex A.R.Franck & al.; Pilosocereus kanukuensis (Alexander) Leuenb.; Pilosocereus lanuginosus (L.) Byles & G.D.Rowley; Pilosocereus leucocephalus (Poselg.) Byles & G.D.Rowley; Pilosocereus machrisii (E.Y.Dawson) Backeb.; Pilosocereus magnificus (Buining & Brederoo) F.Ritter; Pilosocereus millspaughii (Britton) Byles & G.D.Rowley; Pilosocereus mollispinus P.J.Braun & Esteves; Pilosocereus moritzianus (Otto) Byles & G.D.Rowley; Pilosocereus multicostatus F.Ritter; Pilosocereus oligolepis (Vaupel) Byles & G.D.Rowley; Pilosocereus pachycladus F.Ritter; Pilosocereus parvus (Diers & Esteves) P.J.Braun; Pilosocereus pentaedrophorus (Labour.) Byles & G.D.Rowley; Pilosocereus piauhyensis (Gürke) Byles & G.D.Rowley; Pilosocereus polygonus (Lam.) Byles & G.D.Rowley; Pilosocereus purpusii (Britton & Rose) Byles & G.D.Rowley; Pilosocereus pusillibaccatus P.J.Braun & Esteves; Pilosocereus quadricentralis (E.Y.Dawson) Backeb.; Pilosocereus robinii (Lem.) Byles & G.D.Rowley; Pilosocereus splendidus F.Ritter; Pilosocereus ×subsimilis Rizzini & A.Mattos; Pilosocereus tillianus R.Gruber & Schatzl; Pilosocereus vilaboensis (Diers & Esteves) P.J.Braun |
| | Siccobaccatus P.J.Braun & Esteves | Siccobaccatus estevesii (Buining & Brederoo) P.J.Braun & Esteves; Siccobaccatus dolichospermaticus (Buining & Brederoo) P.J.Braun & Esteves |
| | Stephanocereus A.Berger | Stephanocereus leucostele(Gürke) A.Berger |
| | Stetsonia Britt. & Rose | Stetsonia coryne |
| | Xiquexique Lavor, Calvente & Versieux 2020 | Xiquexique bohlei (Hofacker) N.P.Taylor; Xiquexique gounellei (F.A.C.Weber ex K.Schum.) Lavor & Calvente; Xiquexique × heptagonus N.P.Taylor & Albuq.-Lima; Xiquexique tuberculatus (Werderm.) Lavor & Calvente |

== Intergeneric hybrids ==
Some intergeneric hybrids are known:

| Photo | Notogenus | Parentage | Species |
|---|---|---|---|
| | × Coleocereus P.V.Heath | Coleocephalocereus × Stephanocereus | None published |
| | × Colosocereus G.D.Rowley | Coleocephalocereus × Pilosocereus | None published |
| | × Microsocereus G.D.Rowley | Micranthocereus × Pilosocereus | None published |
