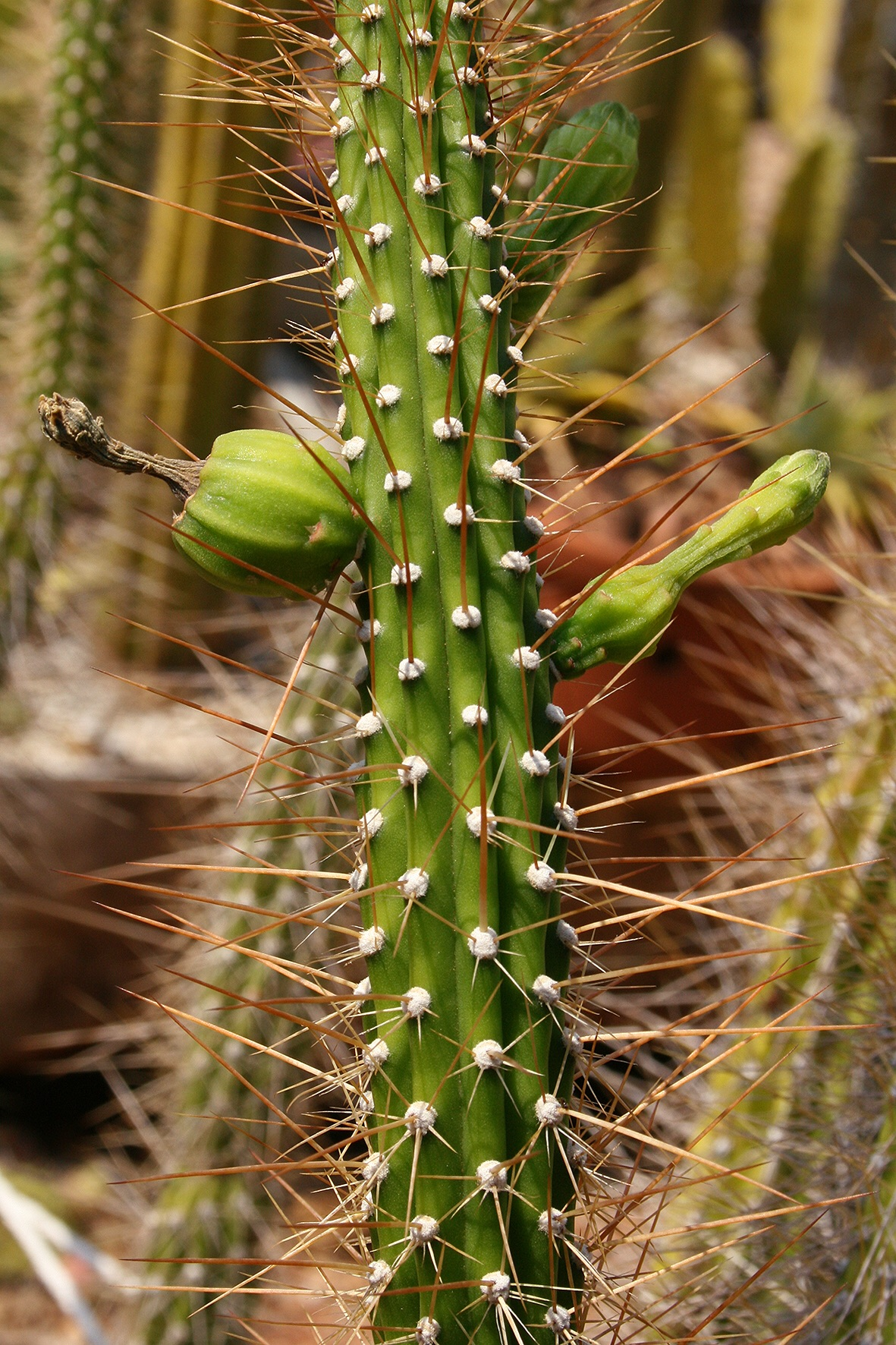

Conservation status
- Vulnerable (IUCN 3.1)

Scientific classification
- Kingdom: Plantae
- Clade: Tracheophytes
- Clade: Angiosperms
- Clade: Eudicots
- Order: Caryophyllales
- Family: Cactaceae
- Subfamily: Cactoideae
- Tribe: Cereeae
- Subtribe: Cereinae
- Genus: Bragaia; Esteves, Hofacker & P.J.Braun
- Species: B. estevesii

Binomial name
- Bragaia estevesii Hofacker & P.J.Braun

Synonyms
- Facheiroa bragaia N. P. Taylor; Brasilicereus estevesii (Hofacker & P.J.Braun) N.P.Taylor & M.Machado

= Bragaia =

Species of cacti

Bragaia is a genus of cacti (family Cactaceae) with the sole species Bragaia estevesii. It is found in Brazil.

== Description ==
Bragaia estevesii typically grows as a weakly branched, upright shrub with a slightly woody base. Its green, cylindrical shoots can reach up to 4 meters long but usually stay shorter. These shoots have 10–12 blunt ribs and are sometimes covered in needle-like, yellowish-brown thorns. The flowers, which open at night and are pollinated by bats, form laterally in the upper part of the shoot. They are slender, funnel-shaped, and lightly scaled, with extrafloral nectar glands, and can be green, yellow, or red. The petals range from greenish-white to white. A noticeable feature is the strong constriction above the pericarpel. The fruit is small, spherical to slightly oval, measuring 15–19 mm long and 6–8 mm wide, with transparent pulp and no exterior spines. The helmet-shaped black seeds are relatively large at 1.5–1.8 mm.

== Distribution ==
Bragaia estevesii is found in northeast Brazil, specifically in the Caatinga region of northwestern Bahia.

== Taxonomy ==
Initially described as Bragaia estevesii in 2009 by Eddie Esteves Pereira, Andreas Hofacker, and Pierre Josef Braun, the species was named in honor of Eddie Esteves Pereira. In 2011, Nigel Paul Taylor and Marlon C. Machado reclassified it under the genus Brasilicereus. In 2023, it was further reclassified as Facheiroa bragaia. Currently, the accepted name is Bragaia estevesii.
