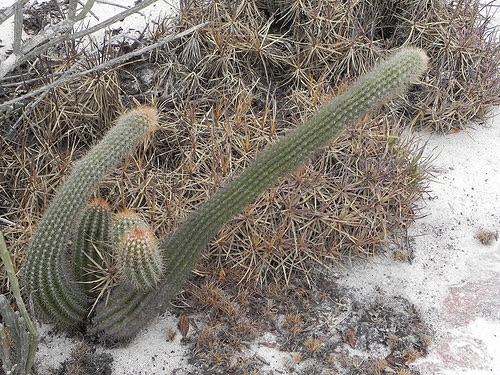

Conservation status
- Least Concern (IUCN 3.1)

Scientific classification
- Kingdom: Plantae
- Clade: Tracheophytes
- Clade: Angiosperms
- Clade: Eudicots
- Order: Caryophyllales
- Family: Cactaceae
- Subfamily: Cactoideae
- Tribe: Cereeae
- Subtribe: Cereinae
- Genus: Lagenosocereus; Doweld
- Species: L. luetzelburgii

Binomial name
- Lagenosocereus luetzelburgii (Vaupel) Doweld

Synonyms
- This species has 8 synonyms: (see text)

= Lagenosocereus =

Genus of cacti

Lagenosocereus luetzelburgii is a species of succulent flowering plant in the family Cactaceae. It is the only member of the monotypic genus Lagenosocereus. It is endemic to the state of Bahia in northeastern Brazil.

== Description ==
Lagenosocereus luetzelburgii is a species of cactus that grows solitarily. Its shoots rarely branch. The stems, which in young plants are globular in form, grow taller and more narrow with age and become bottle-shaped. The epidermis is dark green in color and can reach 1 to 1.5 metres (3 ft 3 in to 4 ft 11 in) tall; of this, the thinner section towards the top comprises 60 to 80 cm (24 to 31 in).

This species has 13 to 16 ribs, on top of which are the areoles. The areoles have 4 to 5 thick central spines, which are initially yellow, but turn gray with age. These can measure up to 3 cm (1.2 in) long. Furthermore, there are 15 to 18 needle-shaped radial spines, which are gray-yellow and measure up to 1.5 cm (0.59 in) in length.

This species develops a cephalium (a woolly structure from which the flowers grow) at the apex of the stem.

The flowers are campanulate or funnel-shaped and often appear in groups near the apex of the stem. They are white to light pink in color, and measure up to 2.6 cm (1.0 in) in length and 1.5 cm (0.59 in) in diameter. The fruits are flattened and spherical in shape; they are initially green in color, and become blue as they mature. They reach 2.5 to 3.5 cm (0.98 to 1.38 in) in diameter.

== Distribution and habitat ==
Lagenosocereus luetzelburgii is native to the state of Bahia in northeastern Brazil. It primarily inhabits the seasonally-dry tropical biome.

It grows on and between crystalline and sandstone rocks in sand and gravel, at altitudes of 380 to 1,550 metres (1,250 to 5,090 ft) above sea level.

== Taxonomy ==
Lagenosocereus luetzelburgii was first published as Cereus luetzelburgii in 1923 by the German botanist Friedrich Karl Johann Vaupel in the scientific journal Zeitschrift für Sukkulentenkunde 1: 57.

Later, the Russian botanist Aleksandr Doveld transferred the species to the new genus Lagenosocereus, renaming it Lagenosocereus luetzelburgii. He registered these changes in the scientific journal Turczaninowia 5 (1): 8, published in 2002.

Etymology

- Lagenosocereus: The genus name is derived from the Greek word lagēnos (meaning "bottle" or "jar") and the Latin word cereus (meaning "candle"); this references the unusual bottle-shaped stems of this species.
- luetzelburgii: The specific epithet honors the German botanist and explorer Philipp von Luetzelburg.

Synonyms

- Arrojadoa luetzelburgii (Vaupel) N.P.Taylor, 2023
- Cephalocereus luetzelburgii (Vaupel) Borg, 1937
- Cereus luetzelburgii Vaupel, 1923 (basionym)
- Coleocephalocereus luetzelburgii (Vaupel) Buxb., 1972
- Pilocereus luetzelburgii (Vaupel) Werderm., 1933
- Pilosocereus luetzelburgii (Vaupel) Byles & G.D.Rowley, 1957
- Pseudopilocereus luetzelburgii (Vaupel) Buxb., 1968
- Stephanocereus luetzelburgii (Vaupel) N.P.Taylor & Eggli, 1991

== Conservation status ==
On the IUCN Red List, Lagenosocereus luetzelburgii is classified as being of Least Concern (LC).

There are no known significant threats to the survival of the species, although some populations may be affected by wildfires and excessive livestock grazing.

== Cultivation ==
This species is cultivated primarily as an ornamental. It may be propagated via seed or cuttings.

== Gallery ==
In habitat in Miguel Calmon, Bahia, Brazil

Branching specimen

Flower buds

Flowers

Young plant
