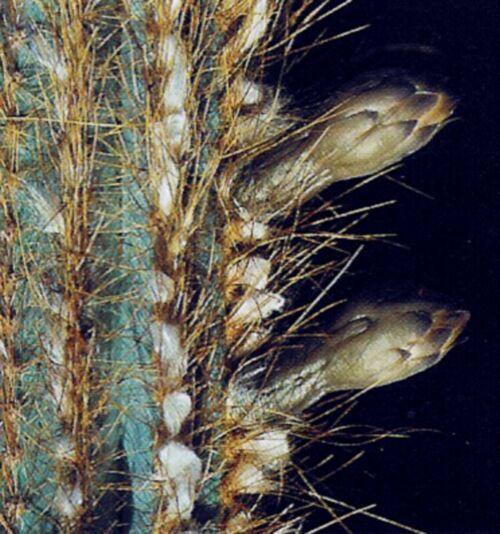

Scientific classification
- Kingdom: Plantae
- Clade: Tracheophytes
- Clade: Angiosperms
- Clade: Eudicots
- Order: Caryophyllales
- Family: Cactaceae
- Subfamily: Cactoideae
- Tribe: Cereeae
- Subtribe: Cereinae
- Genus: Pilosocereus
- Species: P. flexibilispinus

Binomial name
- Pilosocereus flexibilispinus P.J.Braun & Esteves

= Pilosocereus flexibilispinus =

Species of cactus

Pilosocereus flexibilispinus is a species of cactus native to Central Brazil.

== Description ==
Pilosocereus flexibilispinus is tree-like cactus with a distinct trunk that can grow up to 8 m. The upright, bluish-green have a diameter of 5 to 12 cm. Each stem has 9 to 11 narrow ribs. The spines are yellow to brownish-red. 3 to 11 central spines 1.7 to 3.1 cm long and 14 to 20 radial spines 1.1 cm long are found on the areoles.The cephalium is well pronounced. The tubular flowers are up to 4.8 cm long.The spherical fruits have a diameter of up to 3.6 centimeters, splitting open when ripe. Red pulp is found in the fruits.

== Etymology ==
The specific epithet flexibilispinus refers to the plant's flexible spines.
