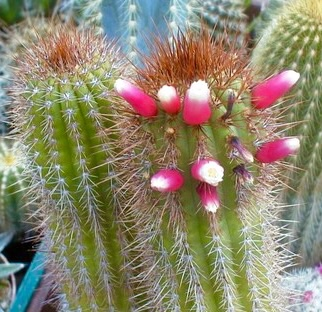

Conservation status
- Critically Endangered (IUCN 3.1)

Scientific classification
- Kingdom: Plantae
- Clade: Tracheophytes
- Clade: Angiosperms
- Clade: Eudicots
- Order: Caryophyllales
- Family: Cactaceae
- Subfamily: Cactoideae
- Tribe: Cereeae
- Subtribe: Cereinae
- Genus: Floribunda; F. Ritter
- Species: F. pusilliflora

Binomial name
- Floribunda pusilliflora F.Ritter (1979)

Synonyms
- Arrojadoa pusilliflora (F.Ritter) N.P.Taylor in Ann. Bot.; Cipocereus pusilliflorus (F.Ritter) Zappi & N.P.Taylor; Pilosocereus pusilliflorus (F.Ritter) P.J.Braun

= Floribunda pusilliflora =

Species of flowering plant

Floribunda pusilliflora is a species of cactus in the family Cactaceae native to Brazil.

== Description ==
Floribunda pusilliflora grows as a shrub with upright to semi-prostrate, green-frosted shoots that reach heights of 30 to 50 centimeters. The shoots are 4 to 5 centimeters in diameter. They have 14 to 18 blunt ribs that are slightly rounded or nearly smooth. The areoles are covered with brown wool, from which straight, needle-like, and sharp spines emerge. The plant has 2 to 4 spreading central spines that are often arranged in a cross pattern, each measuring 1 to 2 centimeters long. Additionally, it has 10 to 12 radial spines that are 3 to 6 millimeters long. Flowers are pink and present on mature specimens; no cephalium is present up to 1.6 centimeters long. The corolla tube is pink, while the tepals are white. Fruits are spherical fruits are 6 to 13 millimeters in diameter similar to that of Arrojadoa.

== Distribution ==
Floribunda pusilliflora is a species of clustering cactus found on cliffs and the Campos rupestres biome of Minas Gerais, near Monte Azul. It grows primarily in the seasonally dry tropical biome at elevations of 800 to 1,000 meters.

== Taxonomy ==
It was first described in 1979 by German botanist, Friedrich Ritter, as F. pusilliflora, this name was reclassified as Cipocereus pusilliflorus in 1991. In 2022, F. pusilliflora was reclassified by Nigel Paul Taylor under the name Arrojadoa pusilliflorus. Currently, the name Floribunda pusilliflora is accepted as the valid name. The specific epithet "pusilliflora" refers to the small flowers for this species.
