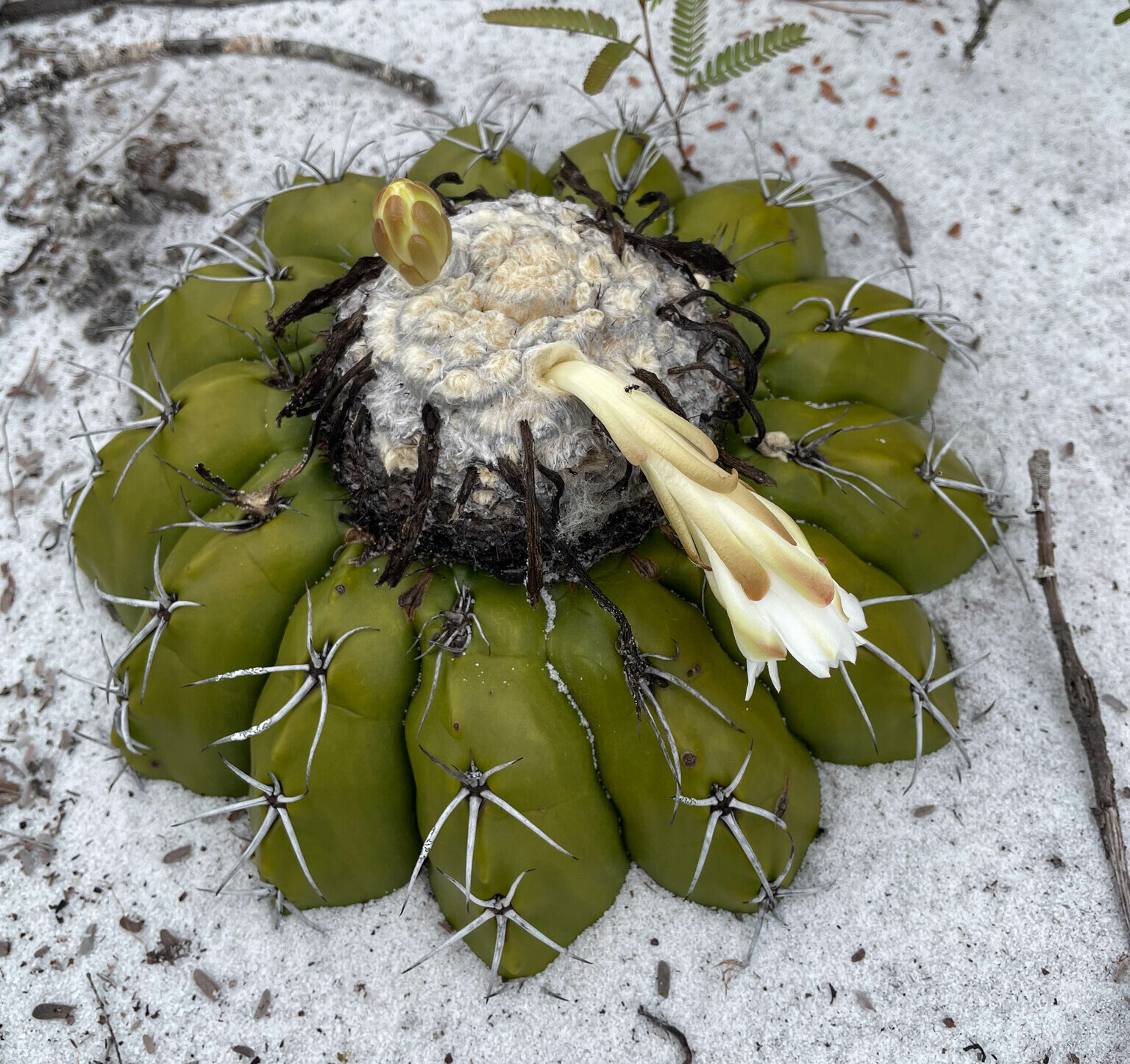

Scientific classification
- Kingdom: Plantae
- Clade: Embryophytes
- Clade: Tracheophytes
- Clade: Spermatophytes
- Clade: Angiosperms
- Clade: Eudicots
- Order: Caryophyllales
- Family: Cactaceae
- Subfamily: Cactoideae
- Genus: Discocactus
- Species: D. pseudoinsignis

Binomial name
- Discocactus pseudoinsignis N.P.Taylor & Zappi

= Discocactus pseudoinsignis =

Species of cactus

Discocactus pseudoinsignis is a species of Discocactus found in Brazil.

== Description ==
Discocactus pseudoinsignis is a solitary cactus with light green, flattened spherical bodies that grow up to 8 cm (3.1 in) tall and 21 cm (8.3 in) wide. It has 12 to 13 straight ribs, barely visible cusps, and strong, dark reddish to black thorns that turn gray with age. Most thorns are straight, but some are curved. The single central spine can reach one centimeter in length, while the 5 radial spines are between 2.5 and 3.2 cm (1.3 in) long, with one pointing downwards. The hemispherical cephalium, consisting of white wool and dark brown bristles up to 3.2 cm (1.3 in) long, grows up to 5 cm (2.0 in) high and has a diameter of 9 to 10 cm (3.5 to 3.9 in). The tubular to funnel-shaped flowers are up to 7.5 cm (3.0 in) long, and the club-shaped fruits are whitish to slightly pinkish white, measuring 3.2 to 4.5 cm (1.3 to 1.8 in) in length and 5 to 9 mm (0.20 to 0.35 in) in diameter.

== Distribution ==
Discocactus pseudoinsignis, a species native to the Brazilian state of Minas Gerais, grows at altitudes ranging from 700 to 1200 meters.

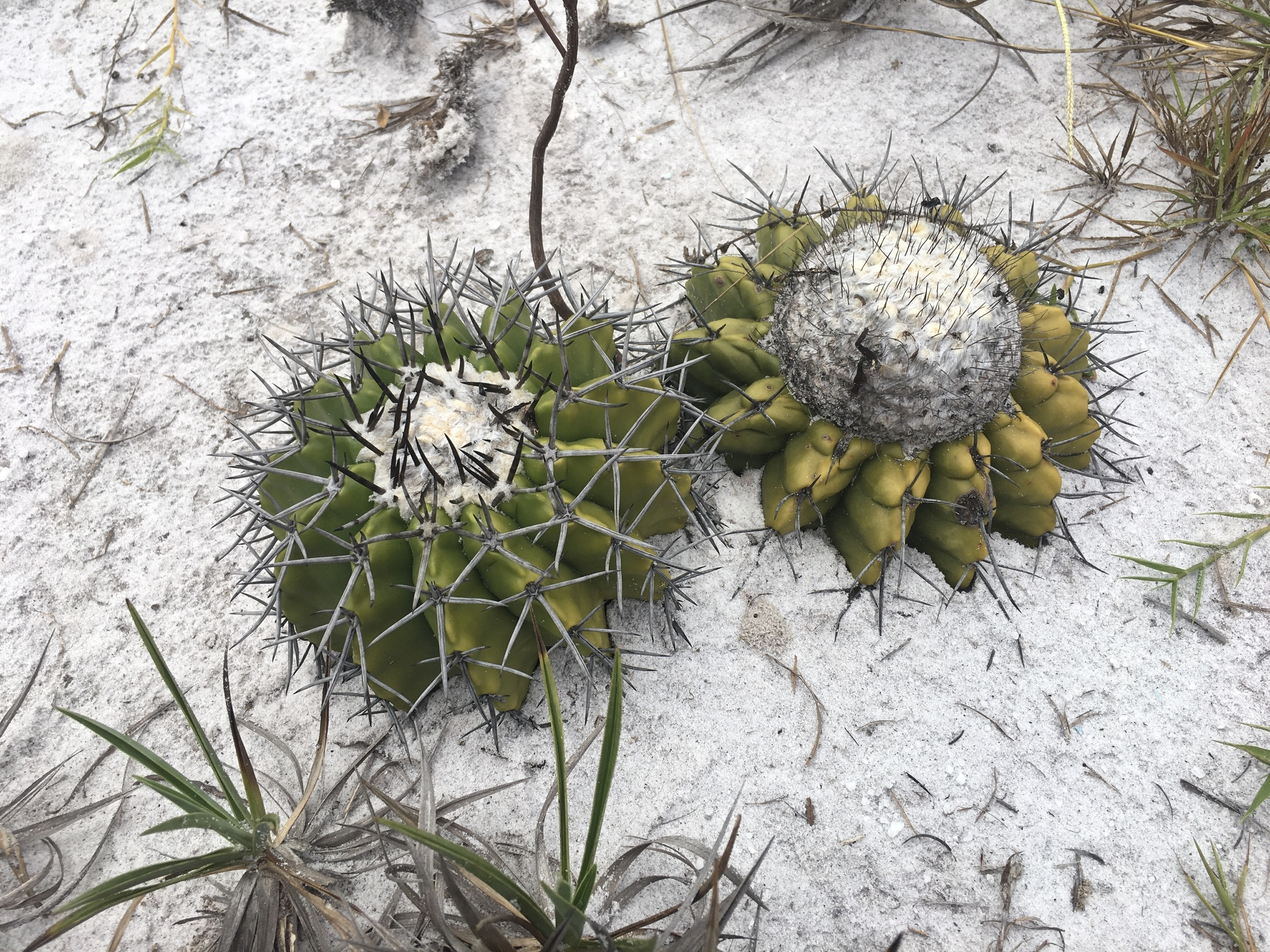
Plants growing in Minas Gerais

== Taxonomy ==
It was formally described in 1991 by Nigel Paul Taylor and Daniela Cristina Zappi. This re-description was necessary because the species had long been known as Discocactus insignis Pfeiff., but that name was no longer considered valid for it. The species name, pseudoinsignis, reflects its resemblance to Discocactus insignis and is derived from the Greek word "pseudo," meaning "false."
