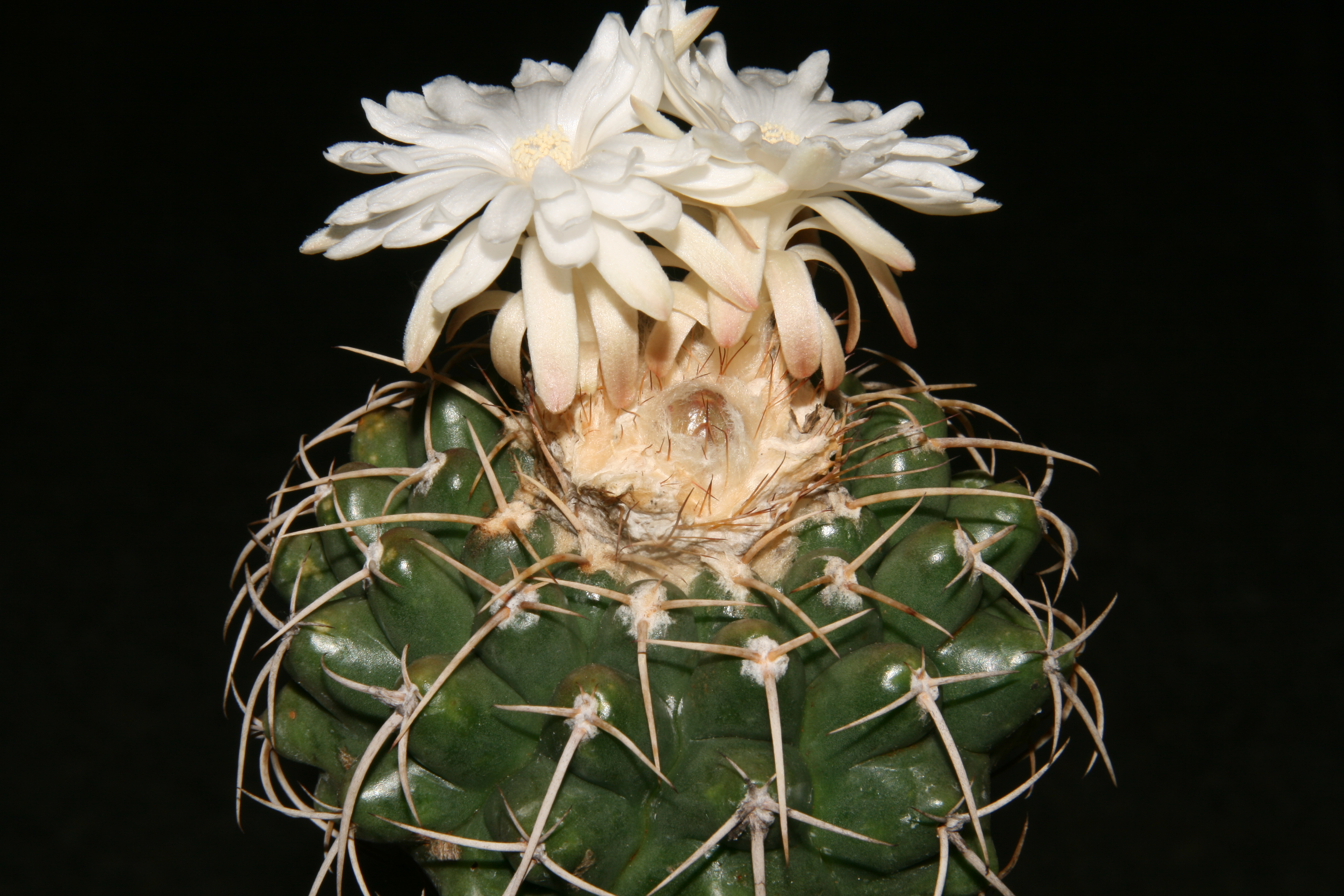

Conservation status
- Critically Endangered (IUCN 3.1)

Scientific classification
- Kingdom: Plantae
- Clade: Tracheophytes
- Clade: Angiosperms
- Clade: Eudicots
- Order: Caryophyllales
- Family: Cactaceae
- Subfamily: Cactoideae
- Genus: Discocactus
- Species: D. hartmannii

Binomial name
- Discocactus hartmannii (K.Schum.) Britton & Rose

Synonyms
- Echinocactus hartmannii K.Schum. 1900; Neodiscocactus hartmannii (K.Schum.) Y.Itô 1981; Discocactus hartmannii var. bonitoensis (Buining & Brederoo) P.J.Braun 1985; Discocactus hartmannii subsp. giganteus P.J.Braun & Esteves 1996; Discocactus hartmannii var. magnimammus (Buining & Brederoo) P.J.Braun 1985; Discocactus hartmannii subsp. magnimammus (Buining & Brederoo) P.J.Braun & Esteves 1995; Discocactus hartmannii var. mamillosus (Buining & Brederoo) P.J.Braun i1985; Discocactus hartmannii var. patulifolius (Buining & Brederoo) P.J.Braun 1985; Discocactus hartmannii subsp. patulifolius (Buining & Brederoo) P.J.Braun & Esteves 1995; Discocactus heptacanthus subsp. magnimammus (Buining & Brederoo) N.P.Taylor & Zappi 1991; Discocactus magnimammus Buining & Brederoo 1974; Discocactus magnimammus subsp. bonitoensis Buining & Brederoo1976; Discocactus mamillosus Buining & Brederoo 1974; Discocactus pachythele Buining & Brederoo 1975; Discocactus patulifolius Buining & Brederoo 1974; Discocactus silicicola Buining & Brederoo 1975

= Discocactus hartmannii =

Species of cactus

Discocactus hartmannii is a species of Discocactus found in Paraguay to Brazil

== Description ==
Discocactus hartmannii is a small, solitary cactus with a disc- or globular shape. It measures 4–7 cm in height and 7–19 cm in diameter, featuring dark green epidermis and branched roots. The plant has 14–22 spiral ribs with deep grooves (>2 cm) between areoles, arranged in a spiral and divided into elongated, conical tubercles supported by 3–7 oval to elongated areoles (2–6 mm long, 1.75–4 mm wide). Areoles appear sunken. Spines start yellowish to horn-colored, turning gray-brown with age. They are curved, rounded in cross-section, with a single central spine (sometimes absent) 0.1–0.8 cm long, and 3–12 radial spines measuring 0.2–2 cm. At the apex of mature plants, a woolly cephalium (1.3–3.5 cm high, 2.7–6 cm diameter) forms, composed of white wool with bright to dark bristles (0.2–4 cm). It protects the apex from cold and UV radiation and attracts pollinators.

The white, fragrant, tubular flowers emerge at the cephalium's edge, opening at night and pollinated by moths. They are 7–7.6 cm long and 4.2–5.5 cm in diameter, with light brown to olive-green buds. The floral tube is 4.5–5.8 cm long, with white to light olive-green scales inside and outside. Inner perianth segments are 2.3–2.6 cm long; outer segments are 2.2–2.8 cm. Stamens have filaments 0.4–1.1 cm long with yellow anthers (1–2 mm). The style is 3.7–5.1 cm long, with a stigma of 5–8 lobes. Inside, ovules are arranged in bundles of 2–4, with naked or hairy funicles. Fruits are white with a pinkish apex, club-shaped, measuring 3.8–4.4 cm long and 0.9–1.1 cm wide. They open vertically when ripe, retaining floral remains, and contain shiny black seeds (1.6–2.2 mm long) with elongated tubercled seed coats.

== Distribution ==
The native range of Discocactus hartmannii species extends from Amambay, Concepción, San Pedro, and Canindeyú departments in Paraguay to west-central Brazil specifically in the states of Goiás and Mato Grosso do Sul and grows primarily in the seasonally dry tropical biome. Plants grow in sandy grassland soils and stony hills composed of silt, sand, gravel, or rocky soil with a high concentration of mica, at elevations of 280 to 700 meters above sea level.

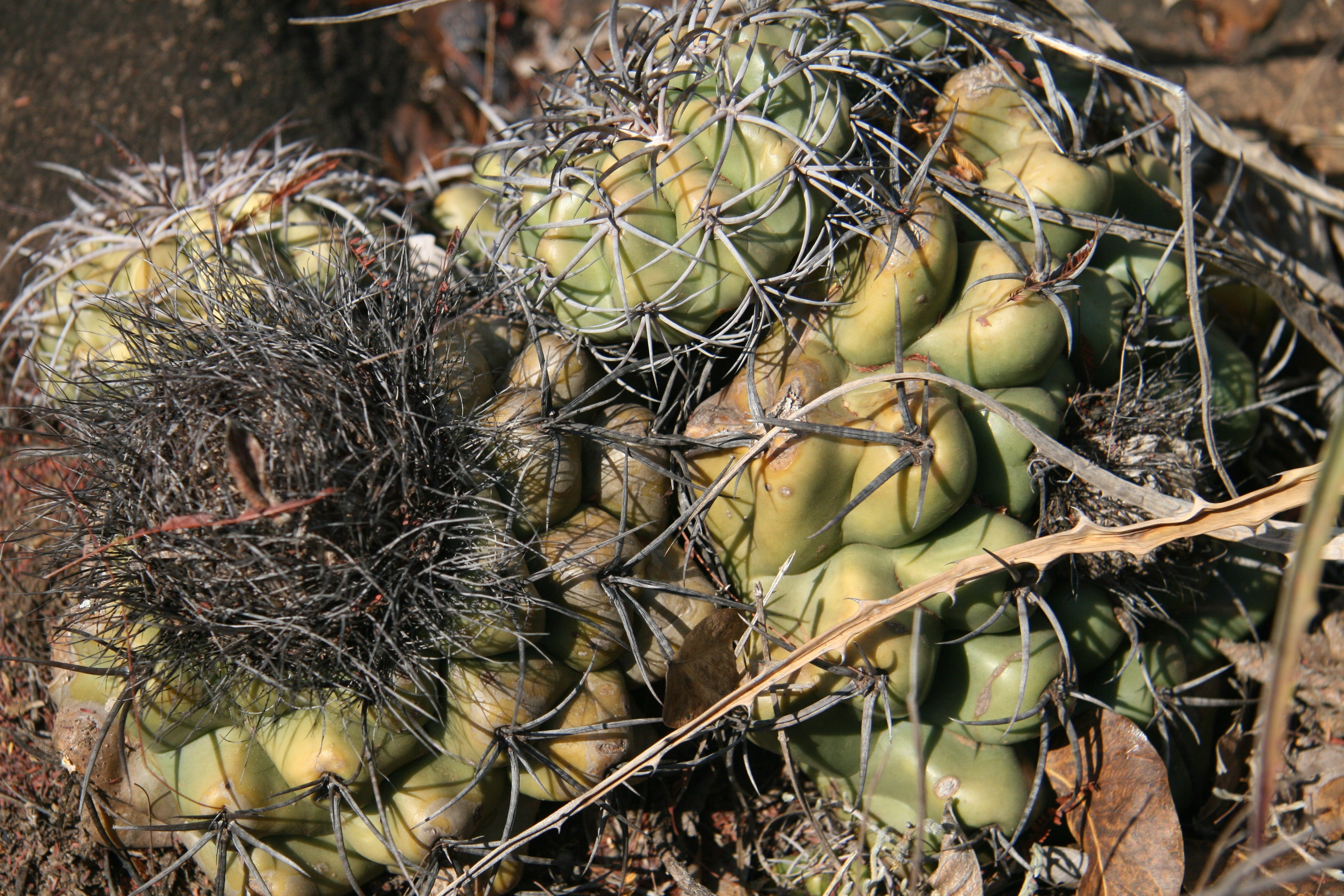
Plants growing in habitat in Mato Grosso do Sul

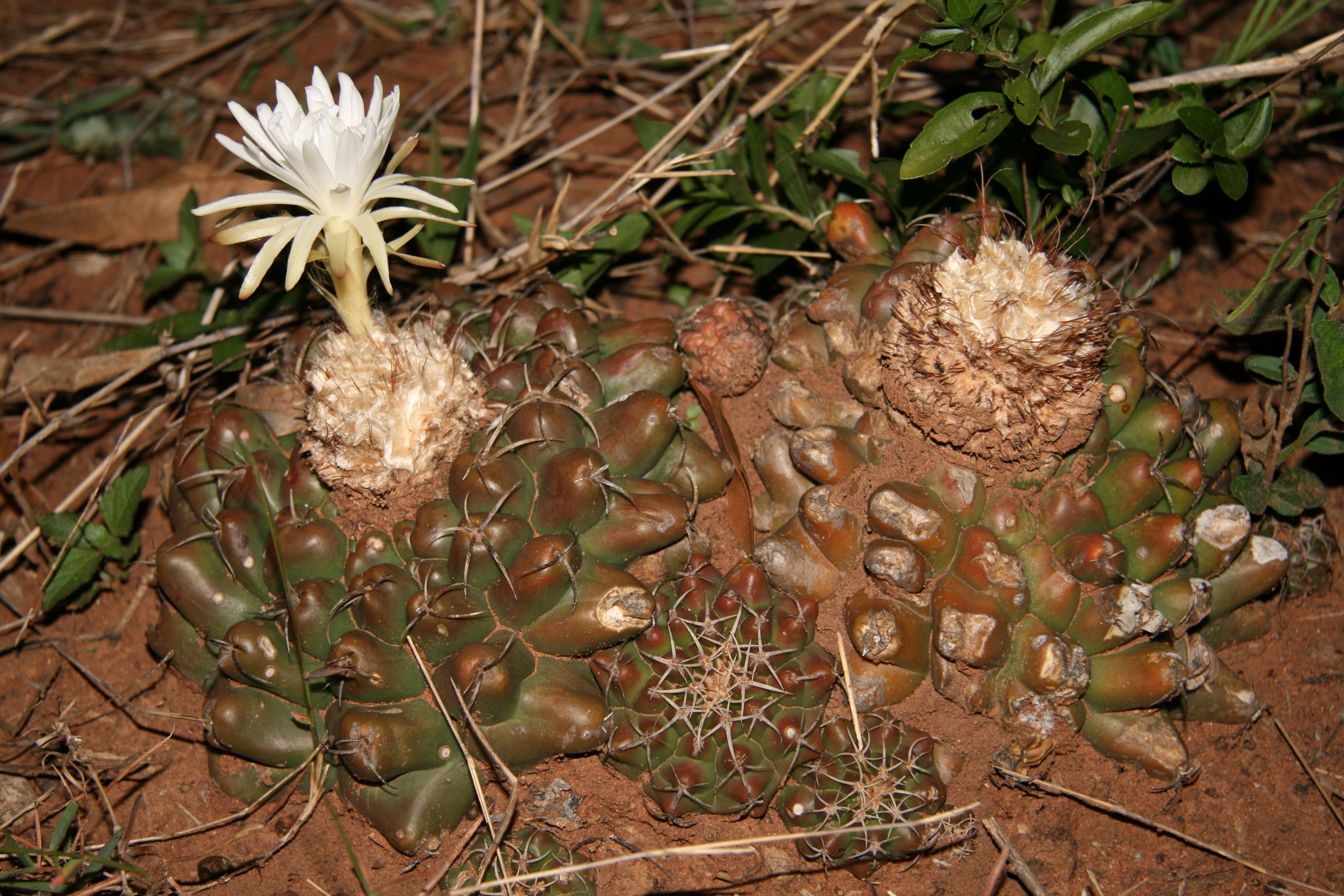

== Taxonomy ==
Originally described as Echinocactus hartmannii from plants collected in Paraguay's Campos am Capivary, it was published in 1900 by botanist Karl Moritz Schumann. The species was later reclassified into the genus Discocactus by Nathaniel Lord Britton and Joseph Nelson Rose in 1922.
