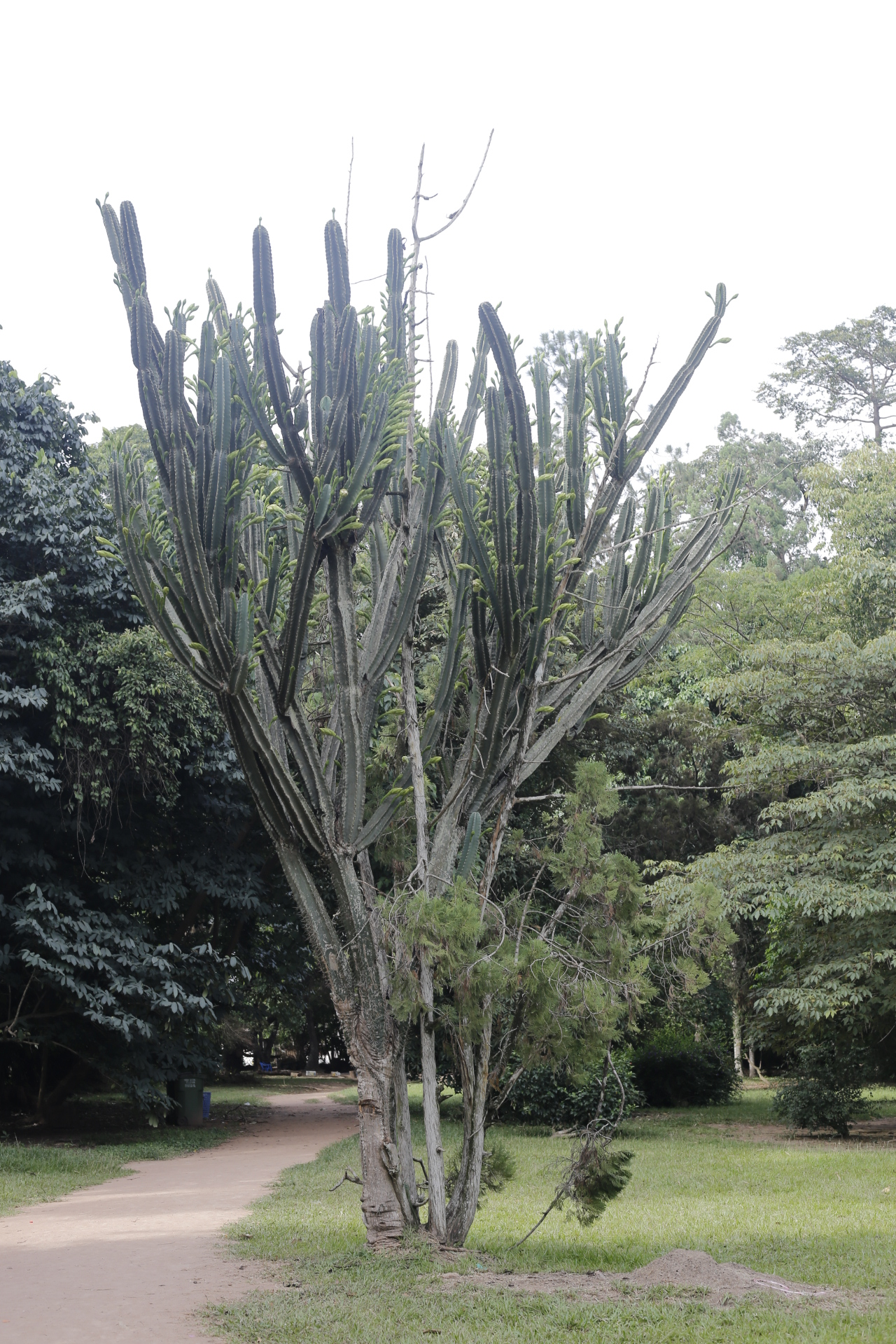

Conservation status
- Least Concern (IUCN 2.3)

Scientific classification
- Kingdom: Plantae
- Clade: Tracheophytes
- Clade: Angiosperms
- Clade: Eudicots
- Order: Caryophyllales
- Family: Cactaceae
- Subfamily: Cactoideae
- Genus: Cereus
- Species: C. stenogonus

Binomial name
- Cereus stenogonus K.Schum.

Synonyms
- Piptanthocereus stenogonus (K.Schum.) F.Ritter 1979; Cereus argentinensis Britton & Rose 1920; Cereus dayamii Speg. 1911; Cereus platygonus Speg. 1911; Cereus roseiflorus Speg. 1925; Cereus tacuaralensis Cárdenas 1964; Piptanthocereus dayamii (Speg.) F.Ritter 1980

= Cereus stenogonus =

Species of plant

Cereus stenogonus, also known as narrow-angled cereus, is a species of Cereus found in Bolivia, Paraguay and Argentina.

== Description ==
Cereus stenogonus grows tree-like with sparse to richly branched, upright shoots and reaches heights of up to 8 meters. There is a clear, heavily thorn trunk. The cylindrical, blue-green shoots are later light glaucous green and have a diameter of 6 to 9 centimeters. There are four to five deeply notched, high ribs. The areoles sitting in the notches are far apart. The usually three to four spreading, conical thorns emerging from them are thick to onion-shaped at their base. They are yellow with a black tip or black and up to 7 millimeters long. The slightly pink flowers are 20 to 22 centimeters long. The egg-shaped fruits are up to 10 centimeters long and red. They contain a red pulp.

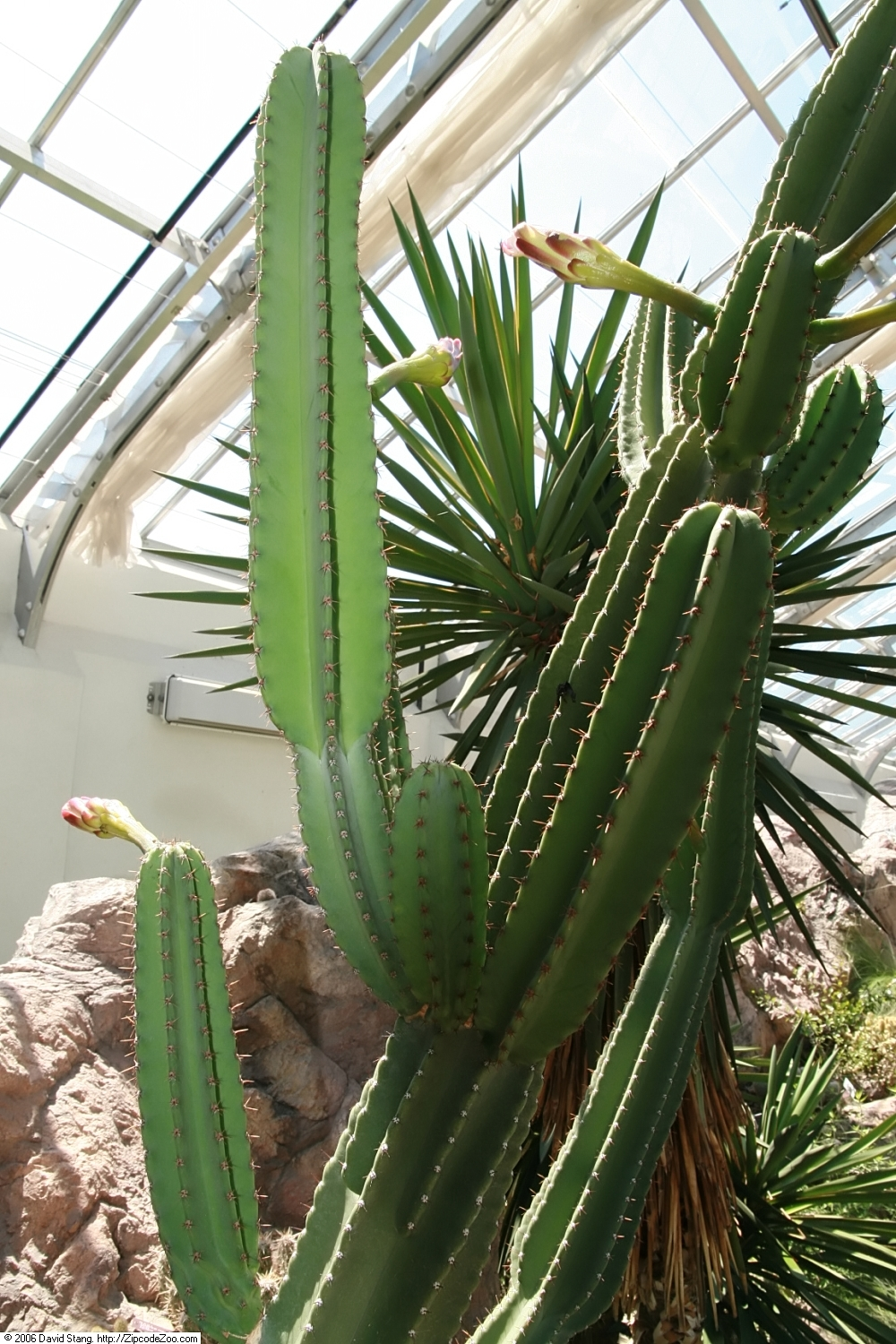
Budding flowers

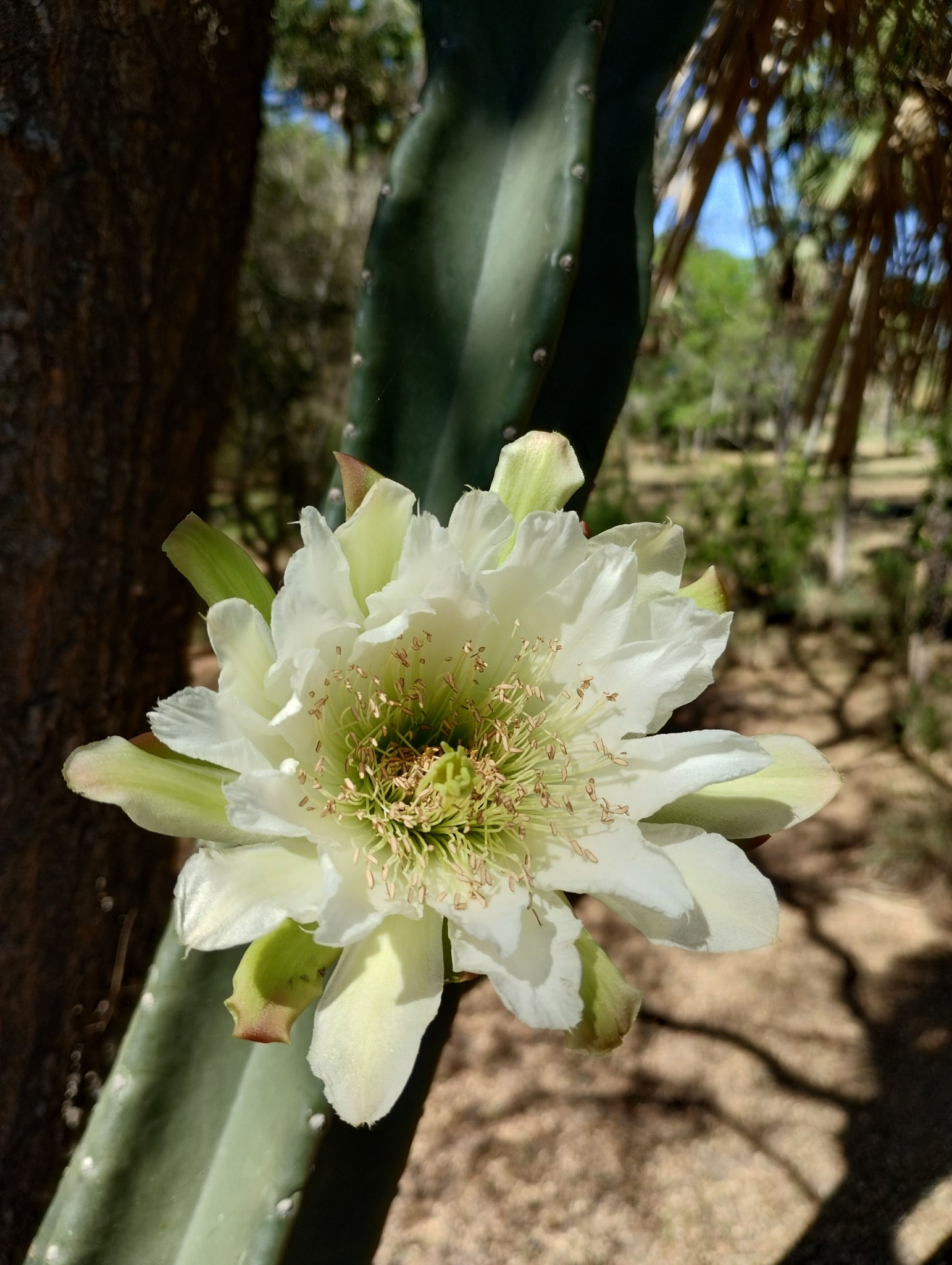
Flower

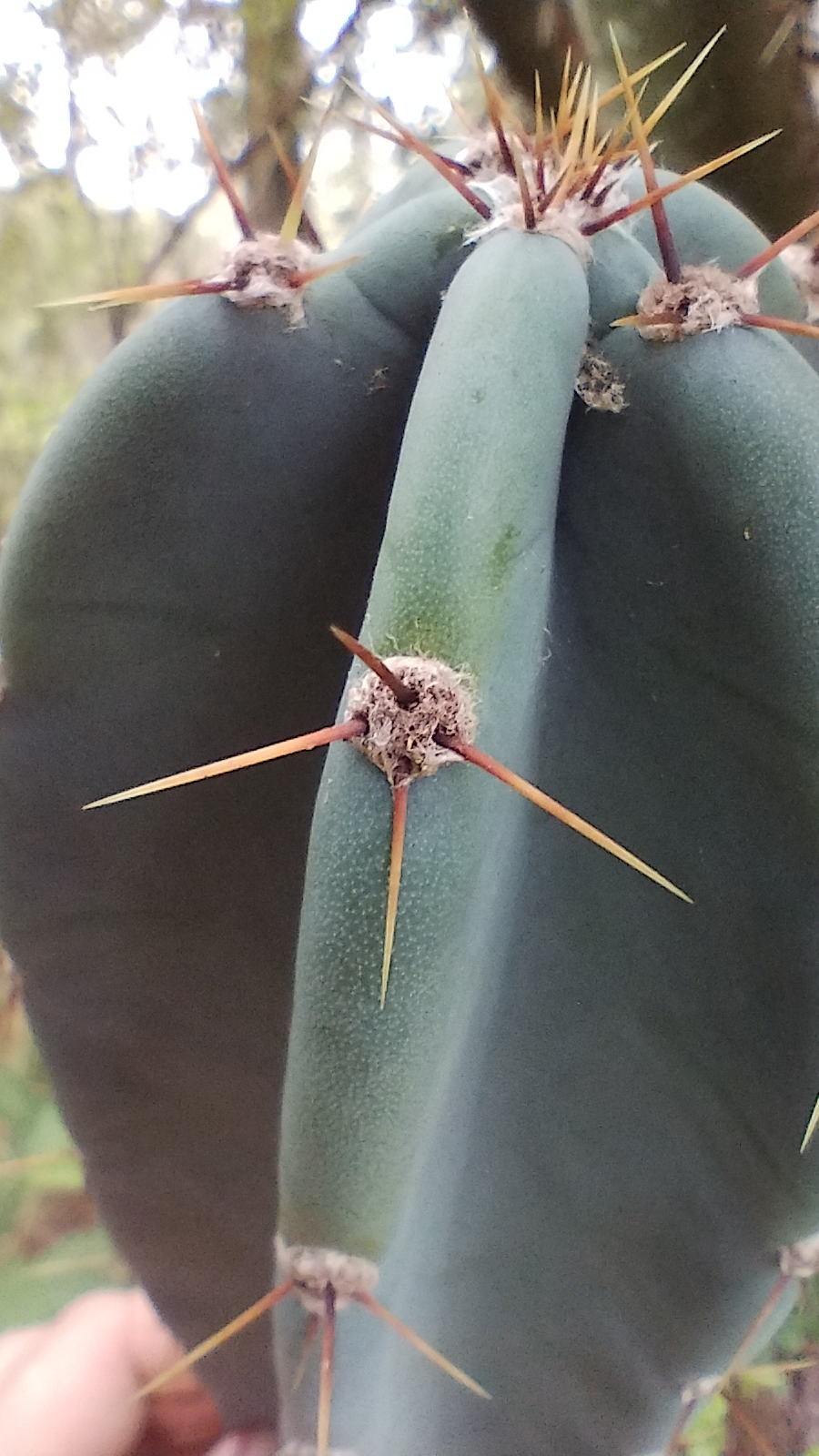
Spines

== Distribution ==
Cereus stenogonus is distributed in Brazil in the state of Mato Grosso do Sul; Bolivia; Uruguay; Paraguay in the departments of Alto Paraguay, Caaguazú, Central, Concepción, Cordillera, Guairá, Paraguarí and Presidente Hayes; and the Argentine provinces of Chaco, Corrientes and Misiones up to 500 meters above sea level. The first description was published in 1899 by Karl Moritz Schumann. This species grow in sand and clay soil in rocky areas growing along with Stetsonia coryne, Quiabentia verticillata, Harrisia bonplandii, Harrisia martinii, and Opuntia sulphurea. In the IUCN Red List of Threatened Species, the species is listed as "Least Concern" (LC).

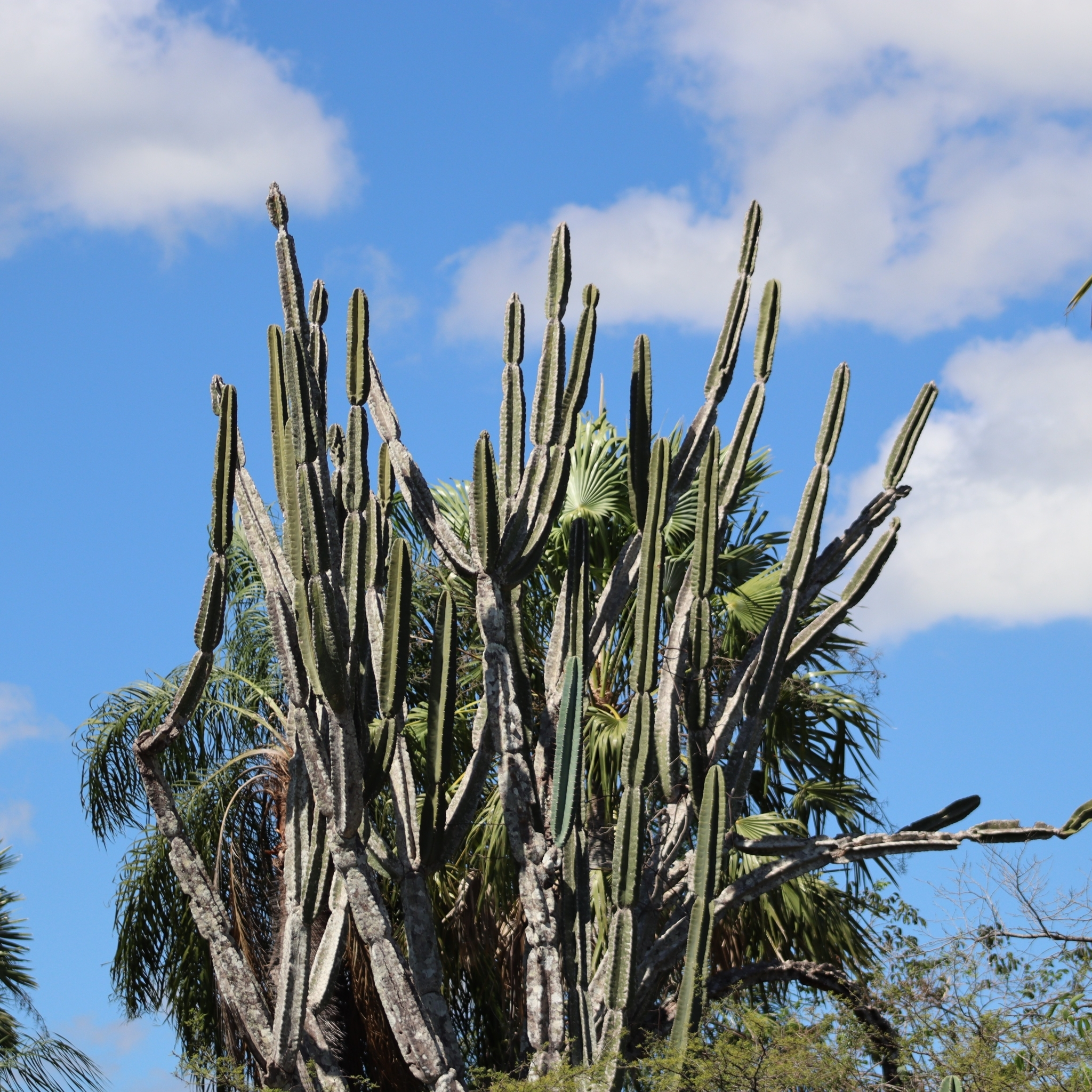
Plant growing in habitat in Porto Murtinho, State of Mato Grosso do Sul, Brazil

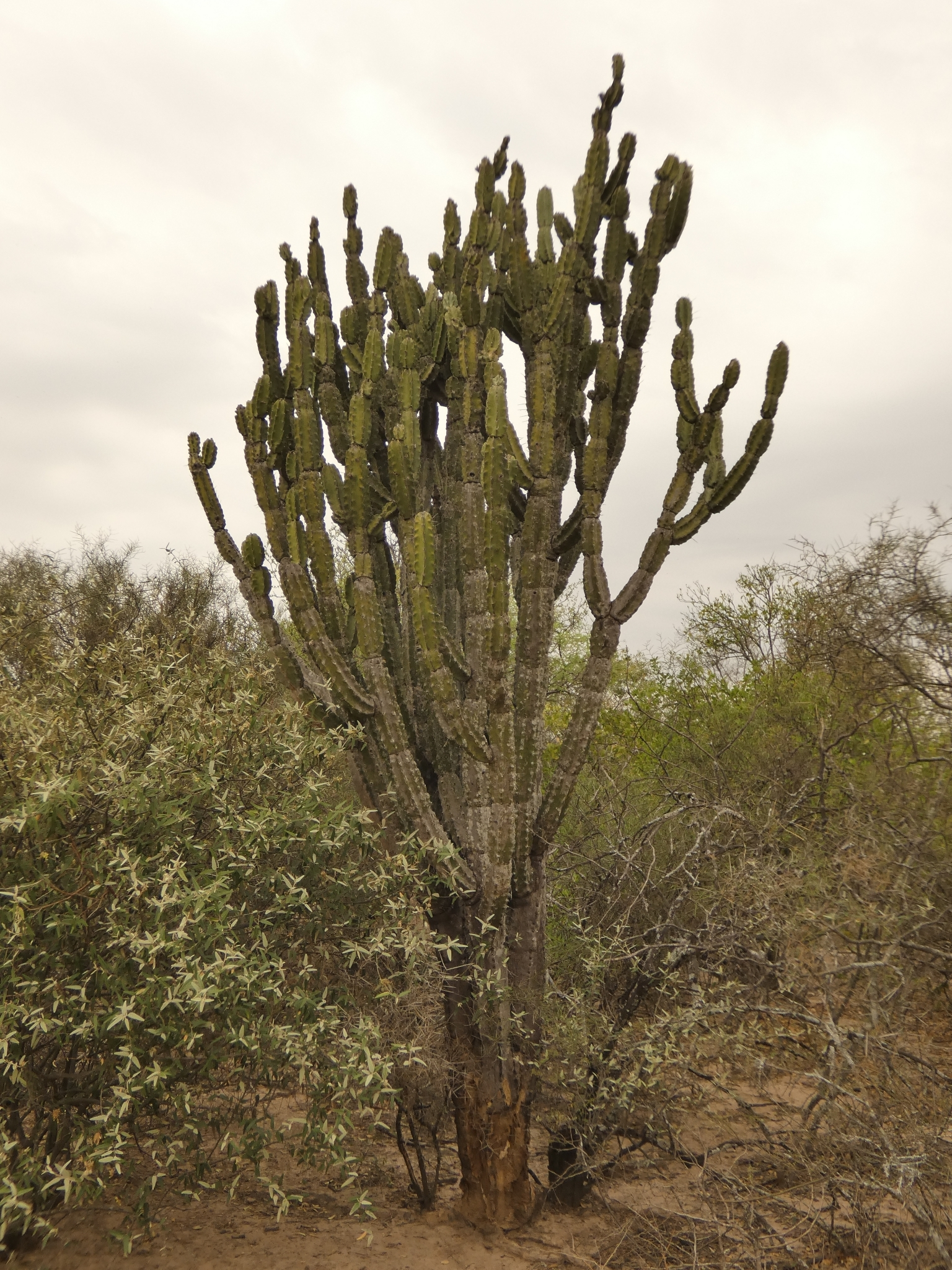
Plant growing in Toledo, Paraguay

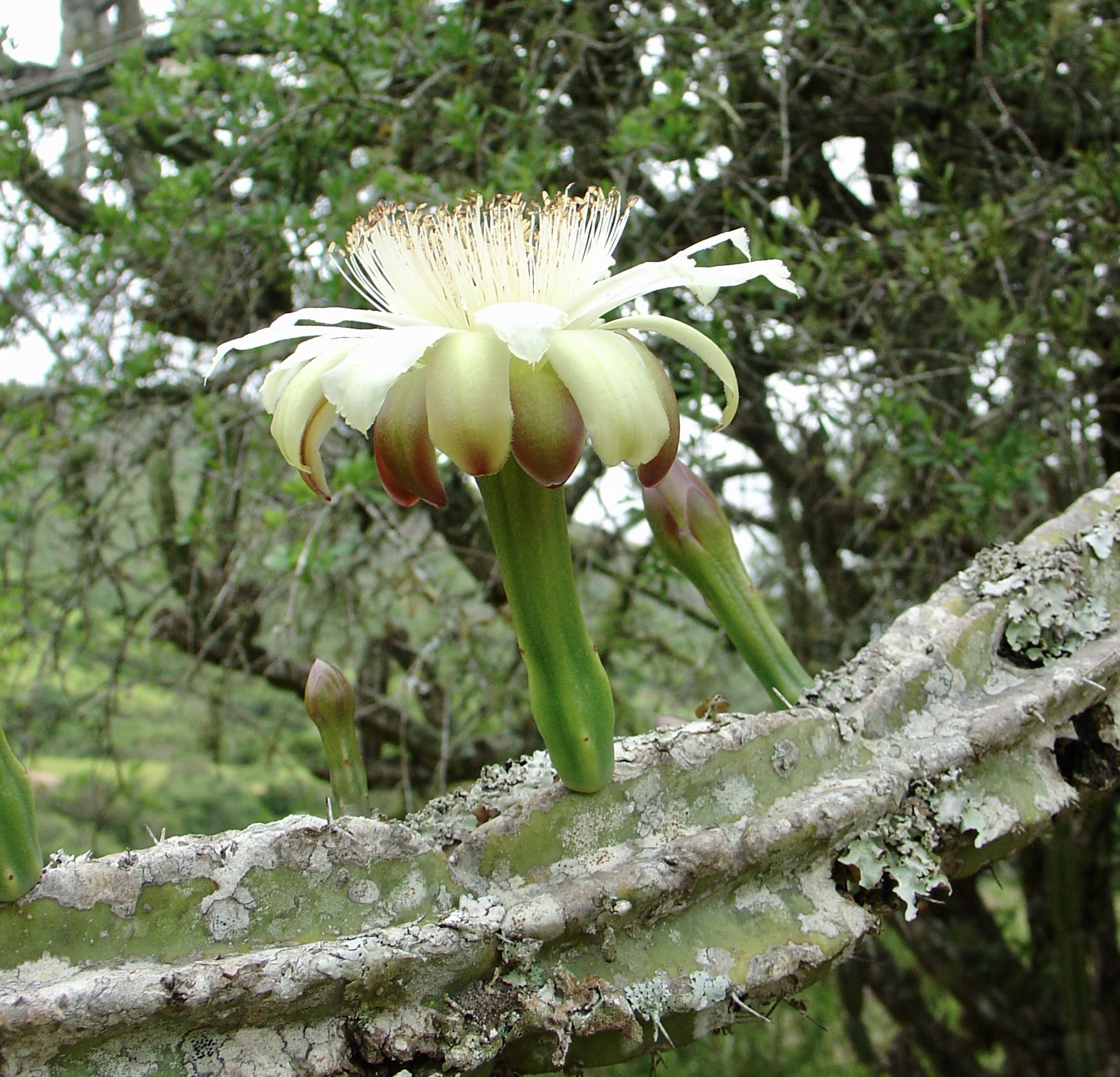
Plant blooming Samaipata, Bolivia

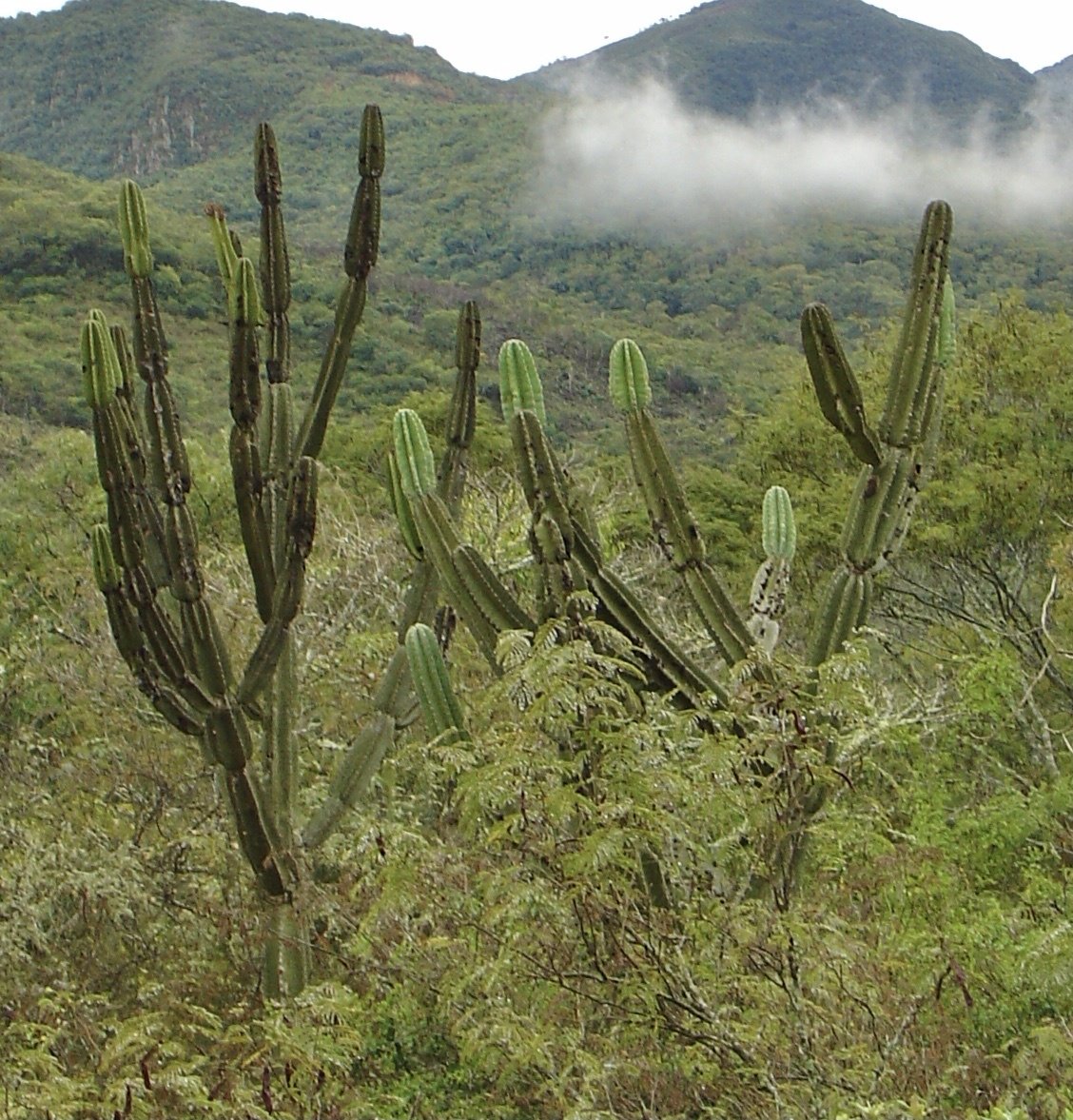
Plant growing in Samaipata, Bolivia

== Taxonomy ==
The first description was published in 1899 by Karl Moritz Schumann. The specific epithet "stenogonus" is derived from the Greek words "stenos," meaning "narrow," and "gonia," meaning "edge," referencing the plant's narrow ribs.
