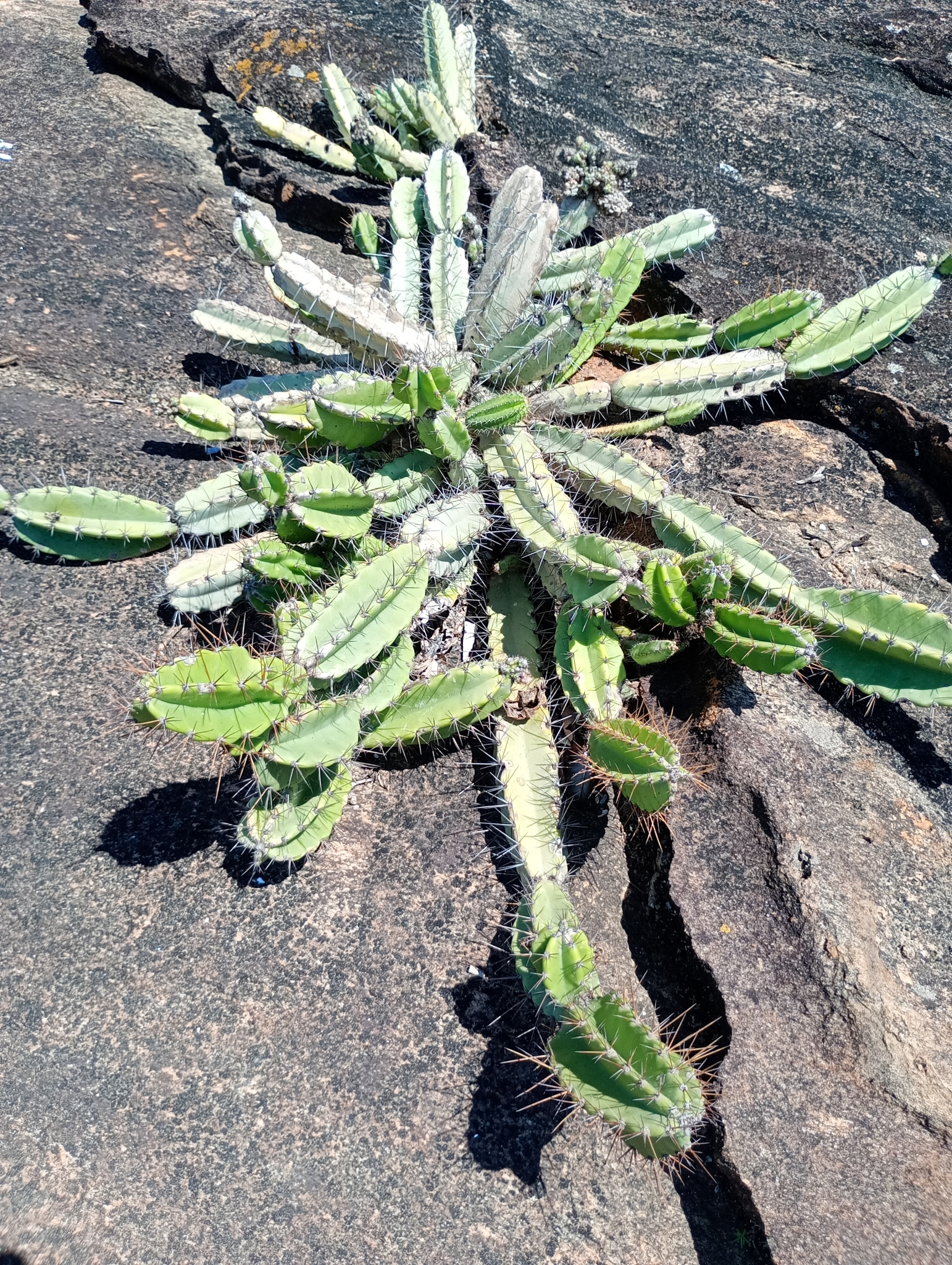

Conservation status
- Least Concern (IUCN 3.1)

Scientific classification
- Kingdom: Plantae
- Clade: Tracheophytes
- Clade: Angiosperms
- Clade: Eudicots
- Order: Caryophyllales
- Family: Cactaceae
- Subfamily: Cactoideae
- Genus: Cereus
- Species: C. fernambucensis

Binomial name
- Cereus fernambucensis Lem. 1839

= Cereus fernambucensis =

Species of cactus

Cereus fernambucensis is a species of Cereus found in Brazil.

== Description ==
Cereus fernambucensis grows shrubby, is richly branched and forms dense clumps up to 5 meters in diameter. The cylindrical, segmented, pale green shoots, which often appear almost white, are 6 to 10 centimeters in diameter. There are three to five thick, sharp-edged ribs that are somewhat wavy. The large areoles on it are initially brownish and later become whitish. The four to ten needle thorns are yellowish brown to bright yellow. They have a length of up to 5 centimeters.

The white flowers are up to 20 centimeters long. The 6 to 7 centimeters long, narrowly oblong fruits are crimson. They contain white flesh.

== Distribution ==
Cereus fernambucensis is distributed along the coast of northeastern Brazil.

== Taxonomy ==
The plant was first described and published in 1839 by Charles Lemaire.

=== Subspecies ===
There are two recognized subspecies:

Image	Name	Distribution
	Cereus fernambucensis subsp. fernambucensis	Brazil
	Cereus fernambucensis subsp. sericifer (F.Ritter) N.P.Taylor & Zappi	Brazil (Rio de Janeiro)
