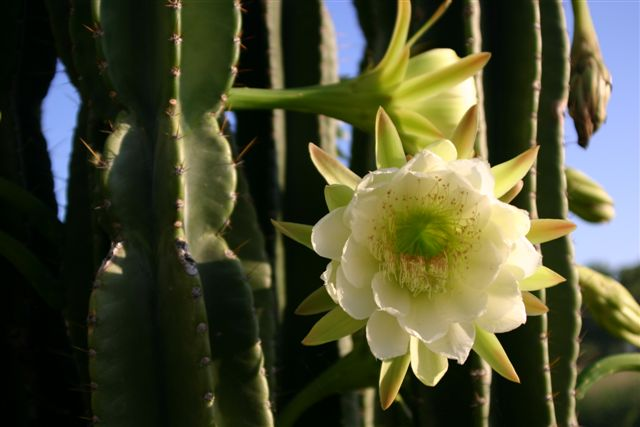

Conservation status
- Least Concern (IUCN 2.3)

Scientific classification
- Kingdom: Plantae
- Clade: Tracheophytes
- Clade: Angiosperms
- Clade: Eudicots
- Order: Caryophyllales
- Family: Cactaceae
- Subfamily: Cactoideae
- Genus: Cereus
- Species: C. hexagonus

Binomial name
- Cereus hexagonus (L.) Mill. 1768.

Synonyms
- Acanthocereus thalassinus (Otto & A.Dietr.) Borg, Cacti 133. 1937.; Cactus regalis Spreng., Syst. Veg. 2: 496. 1825.; Cephalocereus perlucens (K.Schum.) Borg, Cacti, ed. 2, 144. 1951.; Cereus horridus Otto ex Pfeiff., Allg. Gartenzeitung 5: 370. 1837.; Cereus horridus var. alatosquamatus Werderm., Notizbl. Bot. Gart. Berlin-Dahlem 12: 452. 1935.; Cereus lepidotus Salm-Dyck, Cact. Hort. Dyck., ed. 2, 207. 1850.; Cereus karstenii Salm-Dyck, Cact. Hort. Dyck. ed. 2: 218. 1850.; Cereus lepidotus Salm-Dyck, Cact. Hort. Dyck. ed. 2: 207. 1850.; Cereus longiflorus Alexander, Lloydia 2: 199. 1939.; Cereus northumberlandianus Lambert in Loud., Gard. Mag. 91. 1841.; Cactus octogonus Page ex Steud., Nomencl. ed. vol. 2, 246. 1840.; Cereus perlucens K.Schum., Monatsschr. Kakteenk. 10: 173. 1900.; Cereus perrottetii Pfeiff., Enum. Diagn. Cact. 98. 1837.; Cereus regalis Haw. ex Spreng., Syst. Veg. 2: 496. 1825.; Cereus thalassinus Otto & A.Dietr., Allg. Gartenzeitung 6: 34. 1838.; Cereus thalassinus var. quadrangularis C.F.Först., Handb. Cacteenk. 399. 1846.; Pilocereus perlucens (K.Schum.) Werderm., Bras. Saulenkakt. 112. 1933.; Pilosocereus perlucens (K.Schum.) Byles & G.D.Rowley, Cact. Succ. J. Gr. Brit. 19: 67. 1957.; Piptanthocereus lepidotus (Salm-Dyck) Backeb., Blätt. Kakteenf. Pt. 12 (p. 7). 1934

= Cereus hexagonus =

Species of cactus

Cereus hexagonus or lady of the night cactus is a species of columnar cactus found in northern South America.

== Description ==
Cereus hexagonus grows like a tree with erect shoots that branch out from near the base and can reach heights of growth of up to 15 metres. The cylindrical, segmented, glaucous light green shoots have a diameter of up to 12 centimeters and more. There are four to seven thin, wavy ribs that are 3 to 5 centimeters high. The areoles on it are small. The thorns are missing on young shoots or there are only a few. Older shoots have 8 to 10 or more unequal spines per areole. The initially brown thorns become lighter later. They are 5 to 6 centimeters long.

The white flowers are 20 to 25 centimeters long. The 5.5 to 13 centimeters long, egg-shaped fruits are light red. They contain white or pink flesh.

== Distribution ==
Cereus hexagonus is distributed in Guyana, French Guiana, Suriname, Venezuela and northern Brazil.

The species is classified as Least Concern (LC) in the IUCN Red List of Threatened Species.

== Taxonomy ==
The first description as Cactus hexagonus was published in 1753 by Linnaeus in his work Species Plantarum. Philip Miller placed the species in the genus Cereus in 1768.
