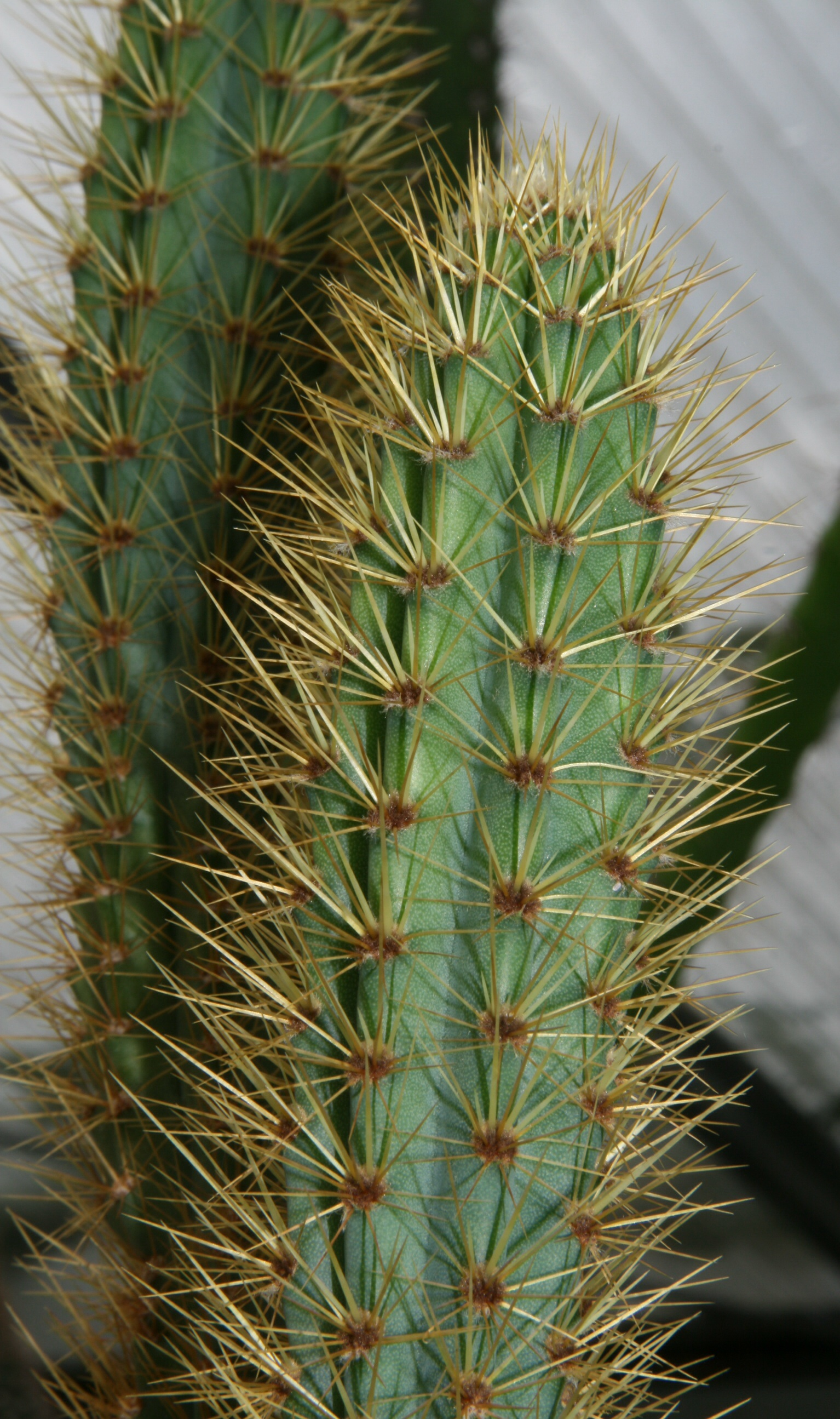

Conservation status
- Least Concern (IUCN 3.1)

Scientific classification
- Kingdom: Plantae
- Clade: Tracheophytes
- Clade: Angiosperms
- Clade: Eudicots
- Order: Caryophyllales
- Family: Cactaceae
- Subfamily: Cactoideae
- Genus: Cereus
- Species: C. insularis

Binomial name
- Cereus insularis Hemsl.

Synonyms
- Monvillea insularis (Hemsl.) Britton & Rose; Cereus ridleii Andrade-Lima ex Backeb.

= Cereus insularis =

Species of cactus

Cereus insularis is a species of columnar cactus in the family Cactaceae. It is found in Brazil.

== Description ==
Cereus insularis grows as a shrub with deep green shoots that are 2 to 3 centimeters in diameter and are often branched. There are six to eight straight ribs. The gray areoles on it are close together. The resulting 12 to 15 unequal, slender, needle-like spines are brownish yellow to greyish brown and up to 1.2 (rarely up to 3) centimeters long.

== Distribution ==
Cereus insularis is found in coastal areas of the islands belonging to Brazil in the Fernando de Noronha archipelago.

== phylogeny ==
- cereus ingens
- - Cereus fernambucensis
  - Cereus insularis

== Taxonomy ==
The first description was published in 1884 by William Botting Hemsley. A nomenclatural synonym is Monvillea insularis (Hemsl.) Britton & Rose (1920).
