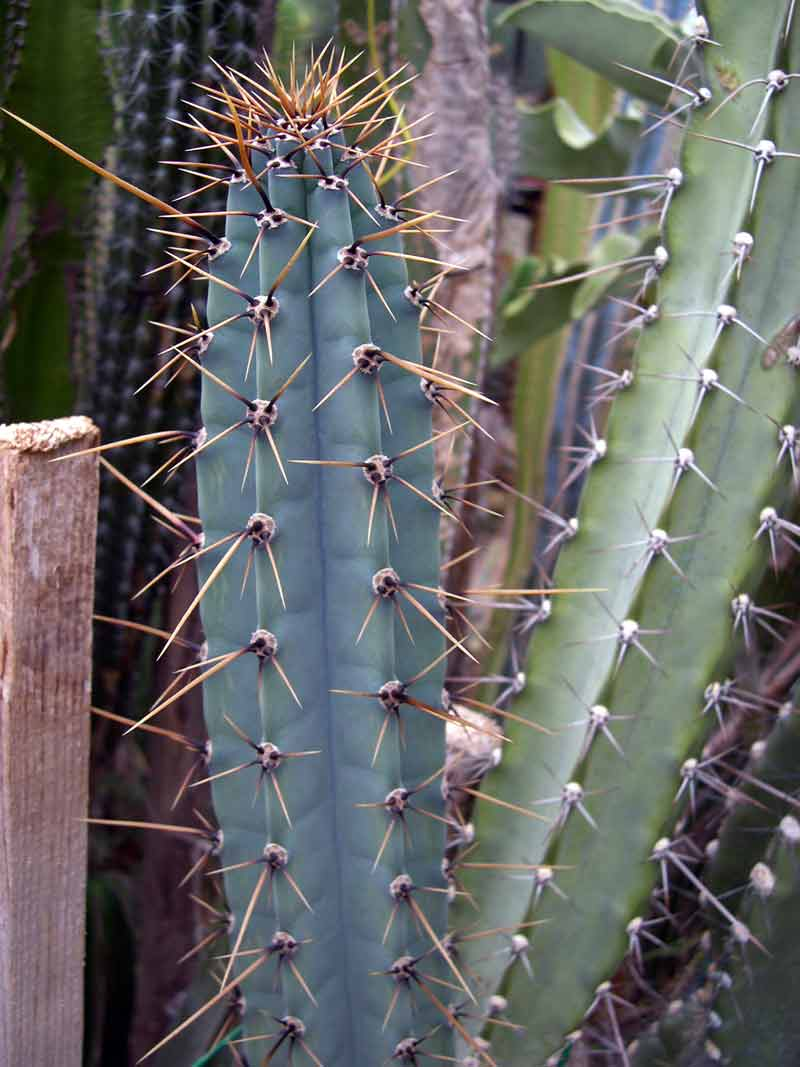

Conservation status
- Least Concern (IUCN 3.1)

Scientific classification
- Kingdom: Plantae
- Clade: Tracheophytes
- Clade: Angiosperms
- Clade: Eudicots
- Order: Caryophyllales
- Family: Cactaceae
- Subfamily: Cactoideae
- Genus: Cereus
- Species: C. forbesii

Binomial name
- Cereus forbesii C.F.Först.

Synonyms
- Cereus cochabambensis Cárdenas; Cereus cochabambensis var. longicarpa Cárdenas; Cereus comarapanus Cárdenas; Cereus hankeanu F.A.C.Weber ex K.Schum.; Cereus huilunchu Cárdenas; Piptanthocereus comarapanus (Cárdenas) F. Ritter; Piptanthocereus forbesii (C.F.Först.) Riccob.; Piptanthocereus forbesii var. bolivianus F. Ritter; Piptanthocereus hankeanus (F.A.C.Weber ex K.Schum.) Riccob.; Piptanthocereus huilunchu (Cárdenas) F. Ritter; Piptanthocereus labouretianus Riccob.

= Cereus forbesii =

Species of cactus

Cereus forbesii is a species of columnar cactus whose native range is Bolivia to N. Central Argentina.

Common hybrids include C. forbesii 'Ming Thing' (a monstrose form) and 'Spiralis', with its vertically spiraling growth habit.

== Description ==
C. forbesii is a columnar, branching, colony-forming cactus which can grow up to 3 m (9 ft 10 in) in height, with a mature circumference of around 15 cm (5.9 in); however, due to weather, natural breakage, self-propagation and other growth-limiting factors, it is more frequently observed at a height of about 2 m (6 ft 7 in). Larger specimens have been noted as exceeding 7 m (23 ft) tall. The cylindrical, glaucoma shoots are initially blue-green and later turn light green, with a diameter of 5 to 8 centimeters. The columns are composed of 4-8 blunt, compressed ribs. The gray areoles are small. The (mostly singular) central spine, which occasionally forms two or three, is strong, yellowish-brown and up to 16 centimetres (6.3 inches) long. The five surrounding radial spines reach a length of up to 2 centimetres (0.79 inches).

The flowers are white to reddish, often with a backing of pink petals and a yellow center. The blooms, when pollinated, ripen into red, pulpy fruits, not unlike the fruits of some Opuntia species.

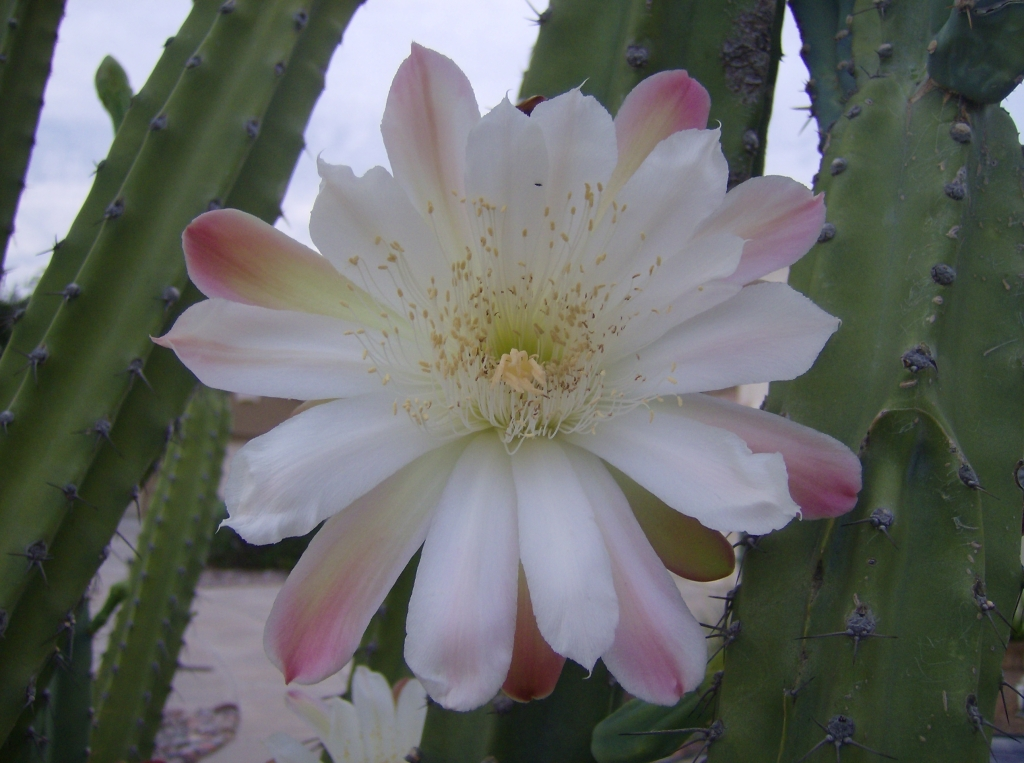
Flower

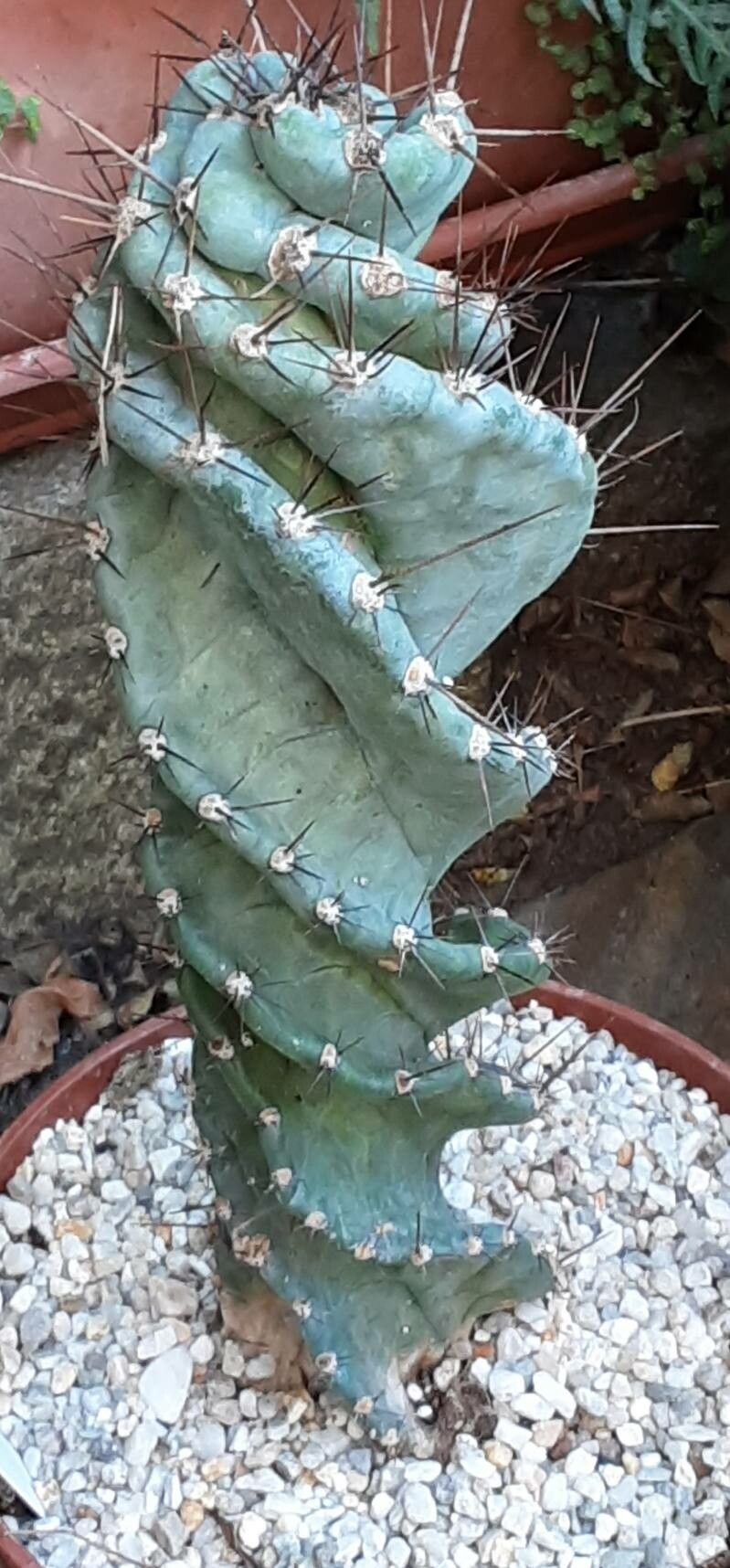
Cereus forbesii "Spiralis"

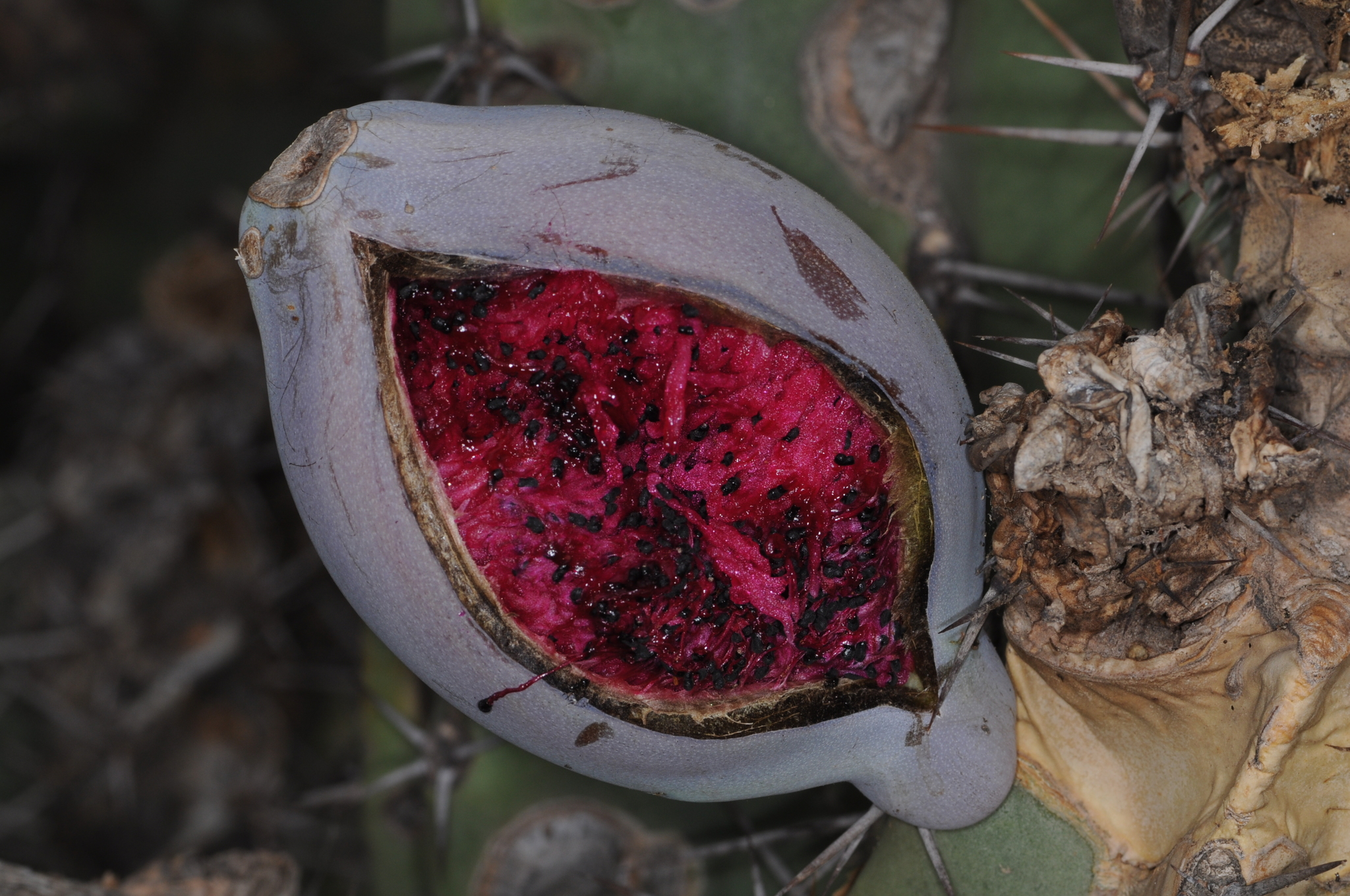
Fruit

== Distribution ==
It is endemic to the Argentine provinces of Catamarca, Chaco, Córdoba, Formosa, Jujuy, La Rioja, Salta, Santa Fe, Santiago del Estero and Tucumán, and north of the city of San Luís. In Bolivia, it is found in the departments of Chuquisaca, Santa Cruz and Tarija. It grows atop arid, windswept hills, within sparse forests, wooded plains, and also on the edges of salt flats, often an elevation of 500–2,000 m (1,600–6,600 ft). Like similarly related cacti, C. forbesii has adapted to extreme temperature fluctuations, including full-sun conditions during the daytime with seasonal near-freezing temperatures at night (especially in winter). Plants growing over 2,000 m above sea level may even contend with wintertime snowfall.

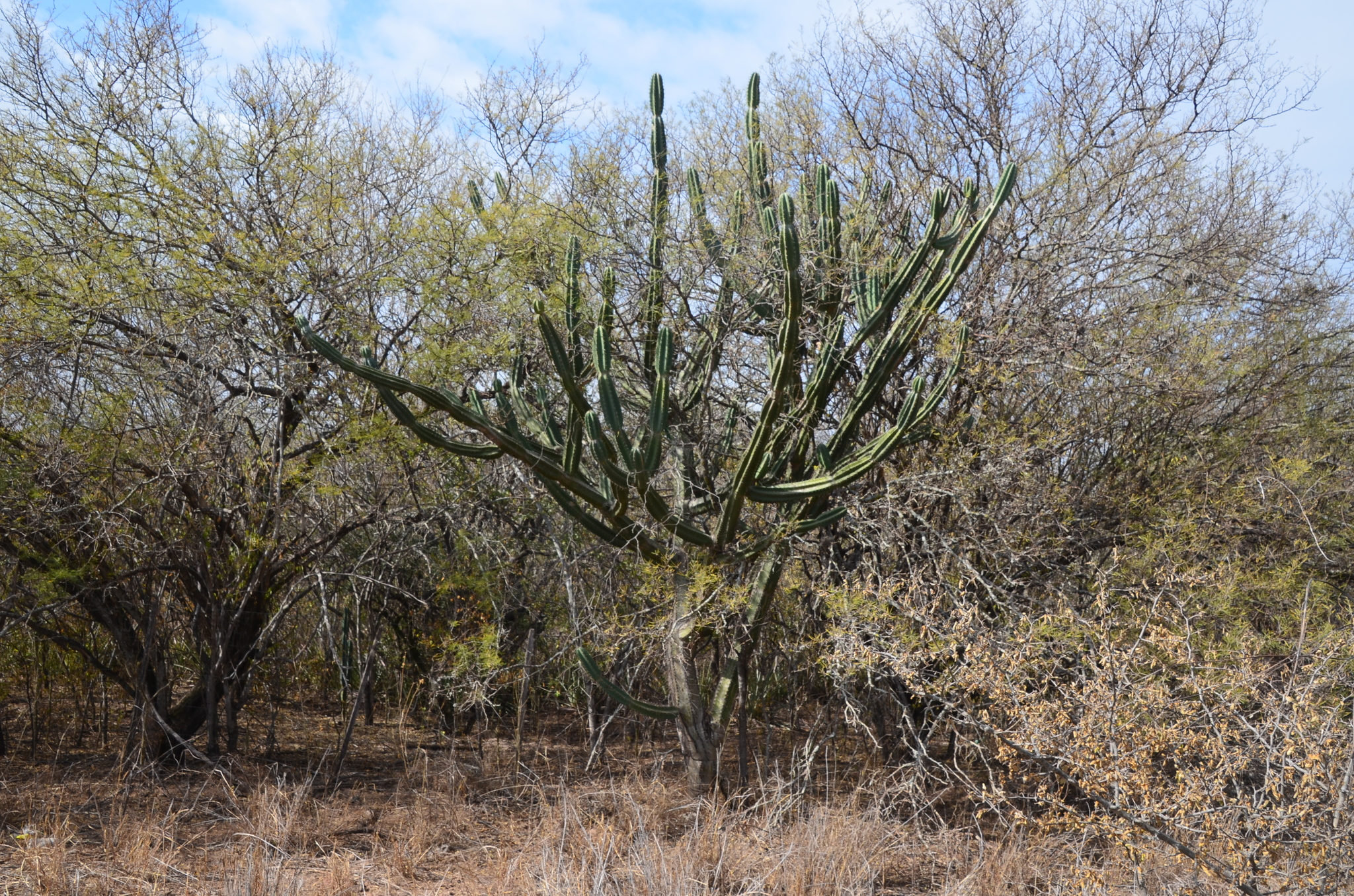
Plant growing in habitat in Paraná, Santiago del Estero Province, Argentina

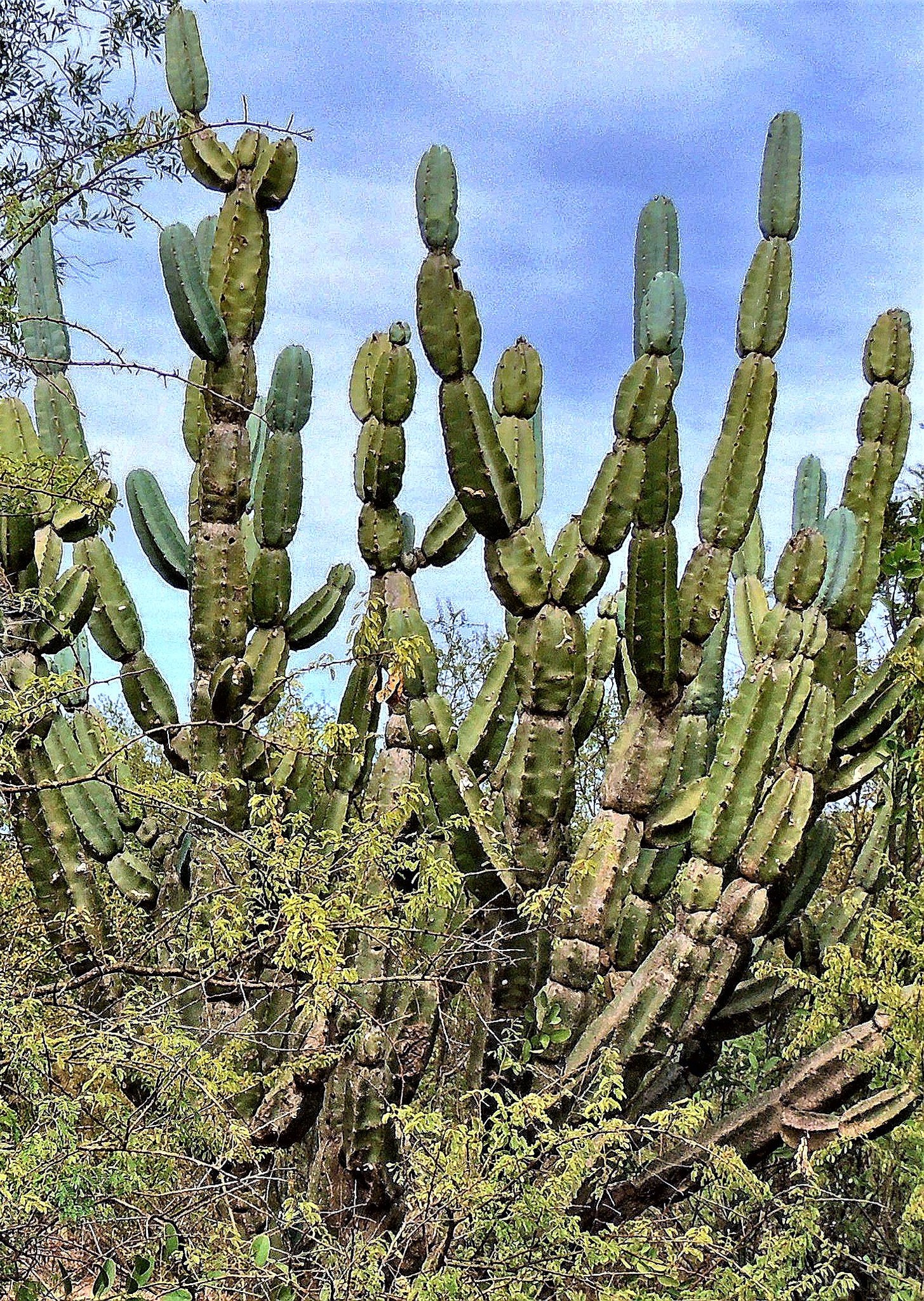
Plant growing in La Laguna, Formosa Province, Argentina

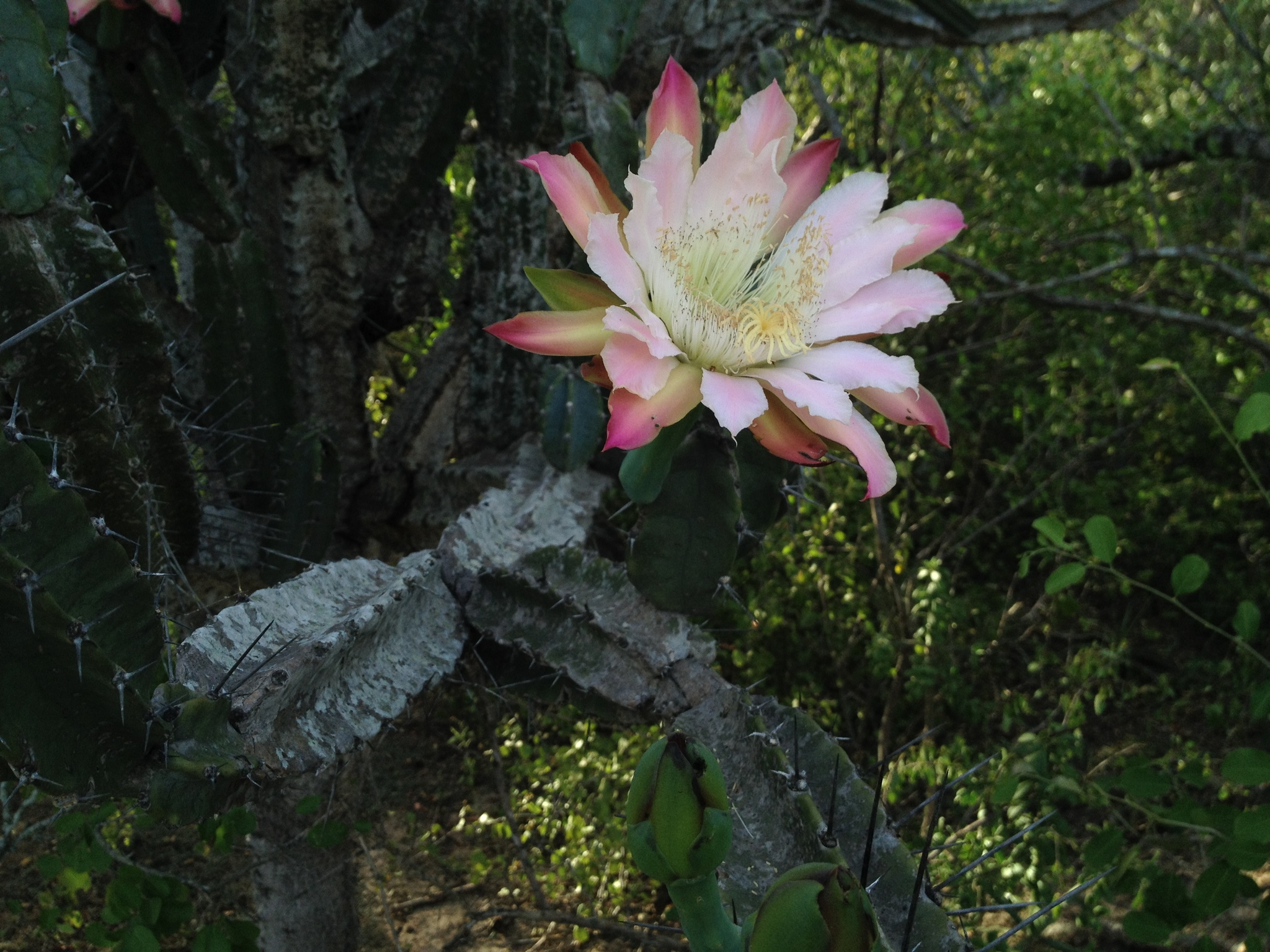
Plant flowering in Fortin Teniente Agripino Enciso, Paraguay

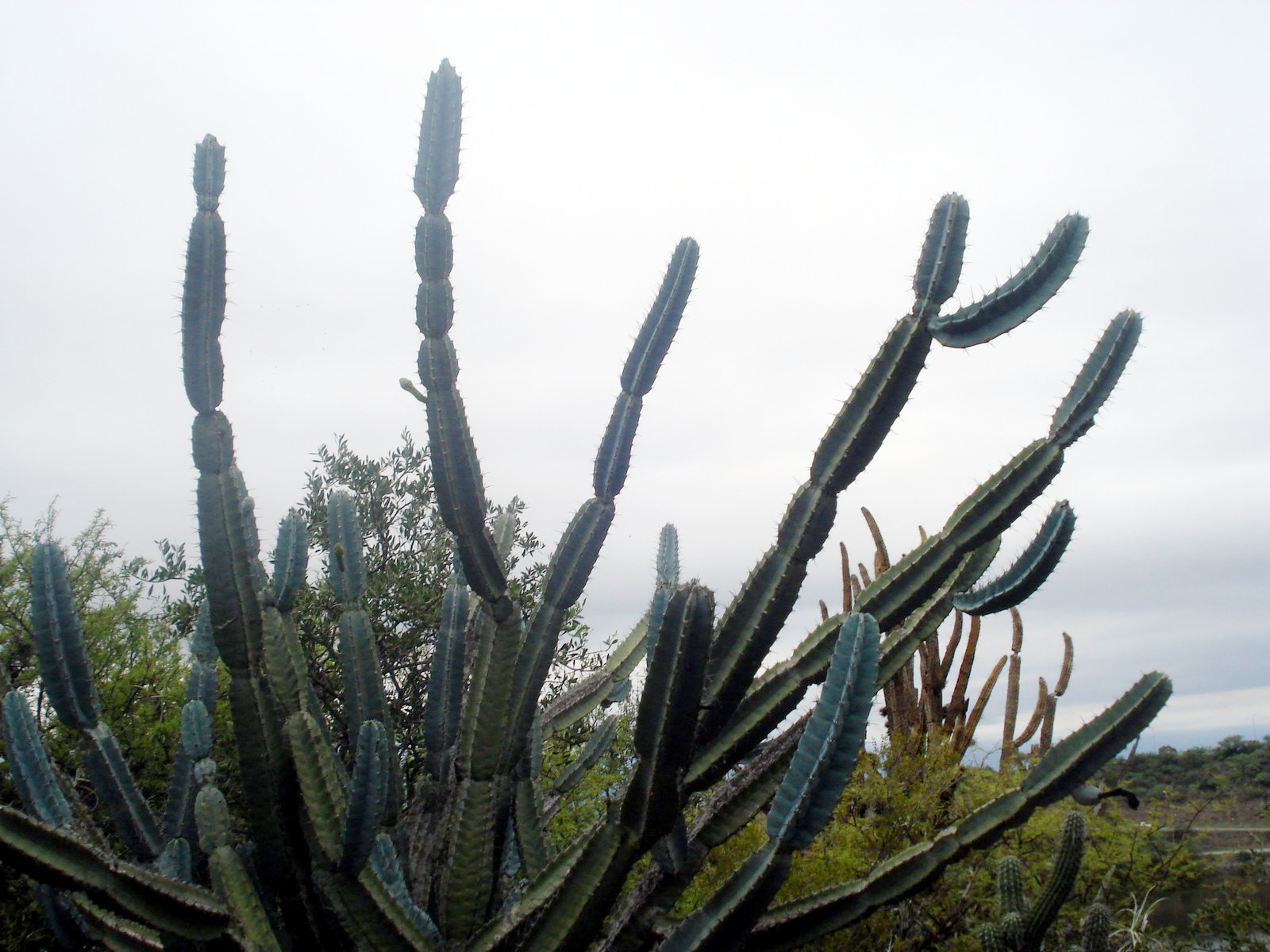
Plant growing wild in Argentina

== Taxonomy ==
The cactus species Cereus forbesii was described by German botanist Carl Friedrich Förster and first published in his 1846 work, Handbuch der Cacteenkunde. The species was named in honor of James Forbes, who served as gardener to John Russell, 6th Duke of Bedford.
