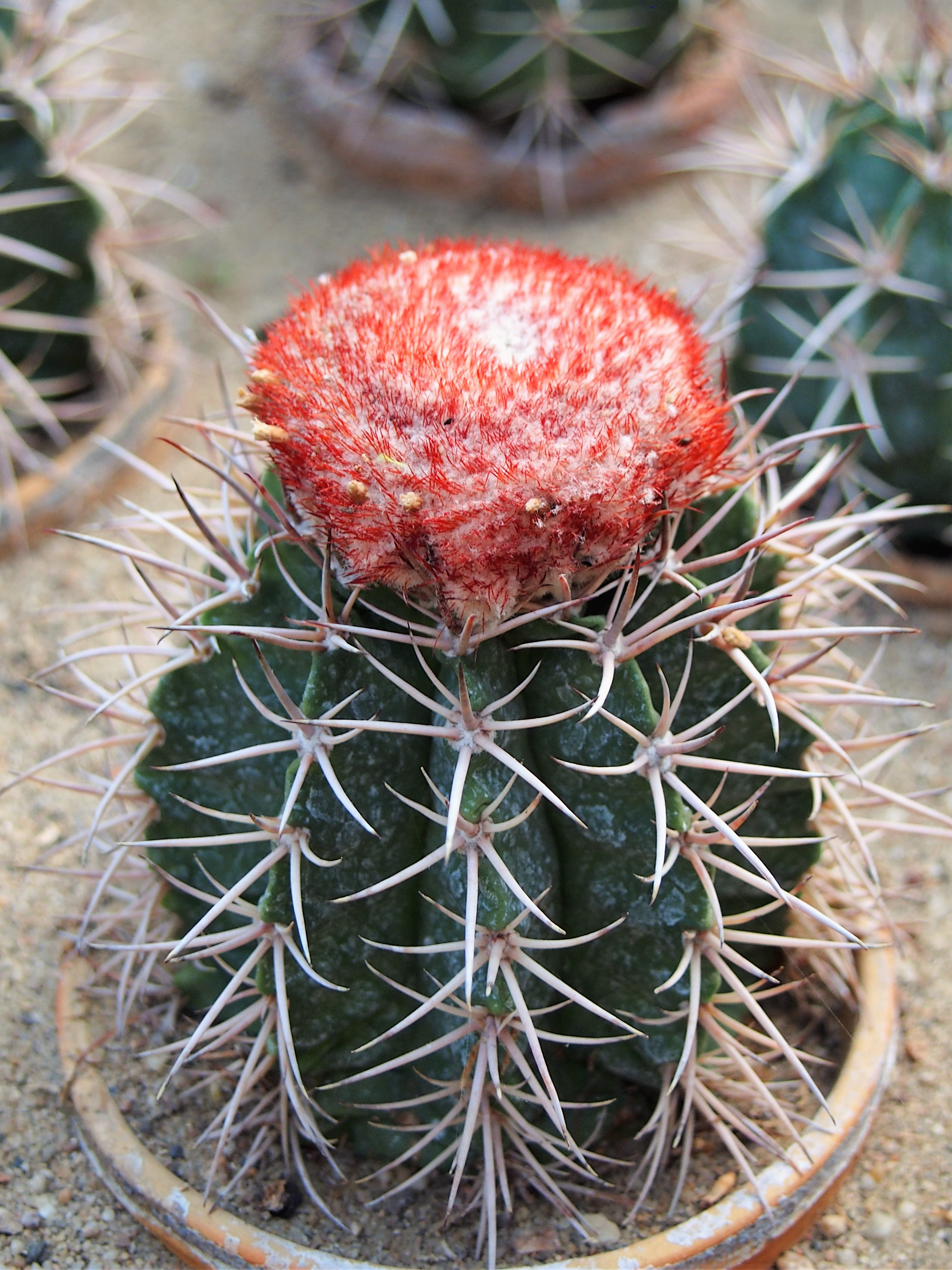

Conservation status
- Data Deficient (IUCN 3.1)

Scientific classification
- Kingdom: Plantae
- Clade: Tracheophytes
- Clade: Angiosperms
- Clade: Eudicots
- Order: Caryophyllales
- Family: Cactaceae
- Subfamily: Cactoideae
- Genus: Melocactus
- Species: M. bellavistensis

Binomial name
- Melocactus bellavistensis Rauh & Backeb.

= Melocactus bellavistensis =

Species of cactus

Melocactus bellavistensis is a species of Melocactus found in Ecuador and Peru.

== Description ==
Melocactus bellavistensis has glossy, dark green, depressed, spherical to slightly elongated, conical shoots measuring 6–25 cm in height and 8–25 cm in diameter. It features 9–18 sharp-edged ribs separated by straight grooves, with areoles sunken into the ribs' notches. The spines are whitish to reddish-yellow with a gray tint, curved downward, and vary in strength. Central spines, if present, are 0.1–1.7 cm long; radial spines number 6–12, up to 2.5 cm long, with the longest at the bottom. The cephalium, consisting of creamy-white wool and reddish bristles, grows up to 15 cm tall and 6–10 cm wide. Flowers are deep pink, 1.8–2.6 cm long, and 0.5–1 cm in diameter. Fruits are red, 1.5–2.9 cm long.

=== Subspecies ===
Accepted subspecies:

Image	Name	Distribution
	Melocactus bellavistensis subsp. bellavistensis	Ecuador to N. Peru
	Melocactus bellavistensis subsp. onychacanthus (F.Ritter) N.P.Taylor	Peru

== Distribution ==
Native to southern Ecuador and northern Peru at elevations between 400 and 1,600 m (1,300 and 5,200 ft). In Ecuador the plants grow among Vachellia macracantha, Anadenanthera colubrina, Ceiba insignis and Trichocereus macrogonus var. pachanoi. In Peru the plants grow among Espostoa mirabilis, Espostoa hylaea, and Matucana madisoniorum.

== Taxonomy ==
It was described in 1957 by Rauh and Backeberg. Its species epithet, "bellavistensis", refers to its occurrence near Bellavista in the Peruvian Amazon.
