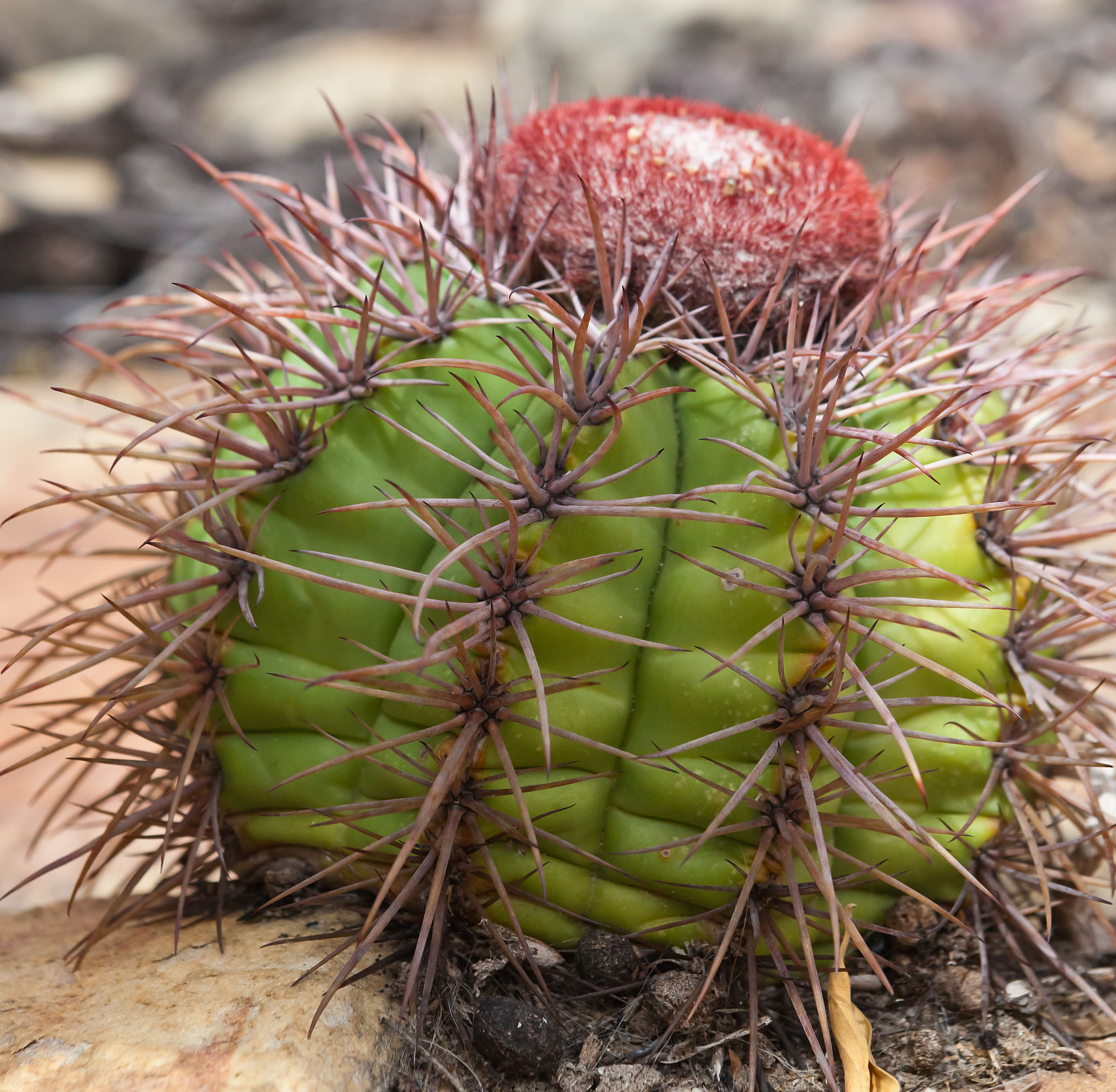

Scientific classification
- Kingdom: Plantae
- Clade: Tracheophytes
- Clade: Angiosperms
- Clade: Eudicots
- Order: Caryophyllales
- Family: Cactaceae
- Subfamily: Cactoideae
- Genus: Melocactus
- Species: M. heimenii

Binomial name
- Melocactus heimenii P.J.Braun & Gonç.Brito

= Melocactus heimenii =

Species of cactus

Melocactus heimenii is a species of Melocactus found in Brazil.
