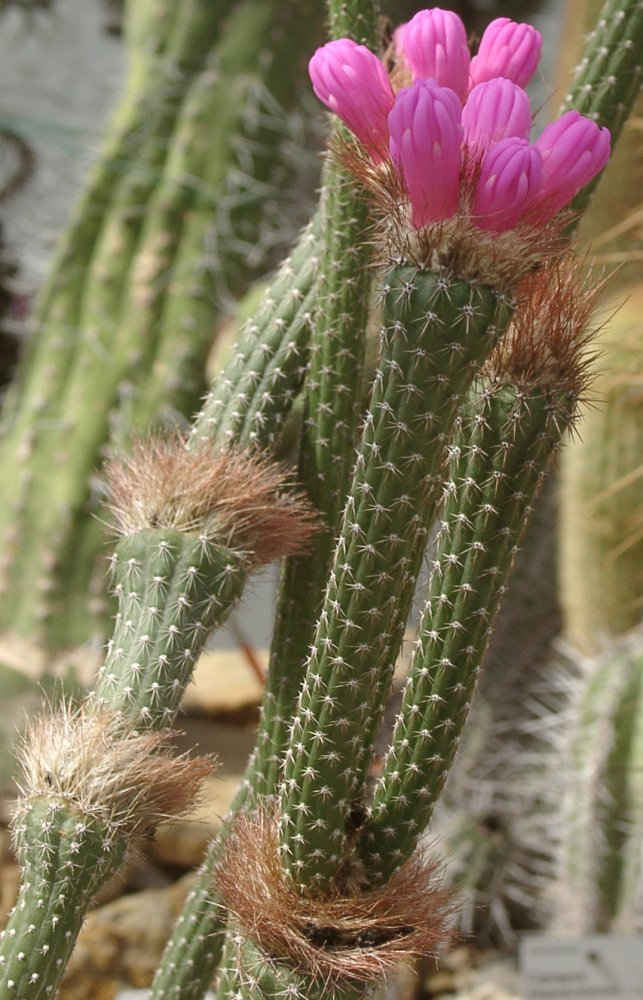
- Arrojadoa penicillata

Scientific classification
- Kingdom: Plantae
- Clade: Tracheophytes
- Clade: Angiosperms
- Clade: Eudicots
- Order: Caryophyllales
- Family: Cactaceae
- Subfamily: Cactoideae
- Tribe: Cereeae
- Subtribe: Cereinae
- Genus: Arrojadoa; Britton & Rose, (1920)

Species
- See text.

Synonyms
- Arrojadoopsis Guiggi; Viridicereus Guiggi

= Arrojadoa =

Genus of cacti

Arrojadoa is a genus of cacti, comprising 9 species. It is named after the Brazilian botanist Miguel Arrojado Lisboa (1872–1932) who was superintendent of the Brazilian Railways at the time that Britton and Rose described the genus in 1920. The genus occurs only in northern Brazil and is found at rocky places, under shrubs, which support their frail stalk. They are subtropical plants, with very little frost tolerance.

== Description ==
The species often have frail stalks that can be upright or procumbent, reaching 2 m high and about 2 to 5 cm thick. There are from 10 to 15 ribs, and ramifications are rare, and usually occur from the base.

The flowers are nocturnal and tube-like, measuring 1 to 3 cm in length and 0.5 to 1 cm in diameter. Flower colors can be pink or carmine. The fruit is berry-like, spherical with a maximal diameter of 1.5 cm, and pink or red when ripe.

== Species ==
As of 2025, Plants of the World Online accepted the following species: (The species Arrojadoa luetzelburgioides described in 2024 was not yet accepted by Plants of the World Online as of October 2026.)

Image	Scientific name	Distribution
	Arrojadoa albiflora Buining & Brederoo	Brazil
	Arrojadoa dinae Buining & Brederoo	Brazil
	Arrojadoa eriocaulis Buining & Brederoo	Northern Minas Gerais – Brazil
	Arrojadoa luetzelburgioides N.P.Taylor & Zappi	Bahia
	Arrojadoa marylaniae Soares Filho & M.Machado	Bahia, Minas Gerais – Brazil
	Arrojadoa multiflora F.Ritter	Bahia – Brazil
	Arrojadoa olsthoorniana Hofacker, M.Machado & R.Pontes	Southern Bahia – Brazil
	Arrojadoa penicillata	Bahia – Brazil
	Arrojadoa rhodantha	Bahia, Minas Gerais, Piaui – Brazil

== Formerly included ==
- Arrojadoa aureispina = Arrojadoa rhodantha
- Arrojadoa bahiensis = Pierrebraunia bahiensis
- Arrojadoa beateae = Arrojadoa dinae
- Arrojadoa canudosensis = Arrojadoa rhodantha
- Arrojadoa eddie-estevesii = Pilosocereus eddie-estevesii
- Arrojadoa flava = Pierrebraunia bahiensis subsp. flava
- Arrojadoa heimenii = Arrojadoa dinae
- Arrojadoa hofackeriana = Micranthocereus hofackerianus
- Arrojadoa horstiana = Arrojadoa rhodantha
- Arrojadoa leucostele = Stephanocereus leucostele
- Arrojadoa luetzelburgii = Lagenosocereus luetzelburgii
- Arrojadoa polyantha = Micranthocereus polyanthus
- Arrojadoa pusilliflora = Floribunda pusilliflora
- Arrojadoa rosenbergeriana = Arrojadoa eriocaulis
- Arrojadoa theunisseniana = Arrojadoa rhodantha
- Arrojadoa violaciflora = Viridicereus violaciflorus

== Cultivation ==
These tropical cacti are ideal for hanging baskets because of their snake like growth, but they are difficult to cultivate. They grow relatively rapidly in good conditions. Propagation is done more by seed than by cuttings. It grows best on slightly humid soil and with plenty of watering from spring to autumn. In winter it should be left without water and at a minimal temperature of 10 °C.
