= Barro Alto =

Barro Alto may refer to the following places in Brazil:

- Barro Alto, Bahia
- Barro Alto, Goiás
