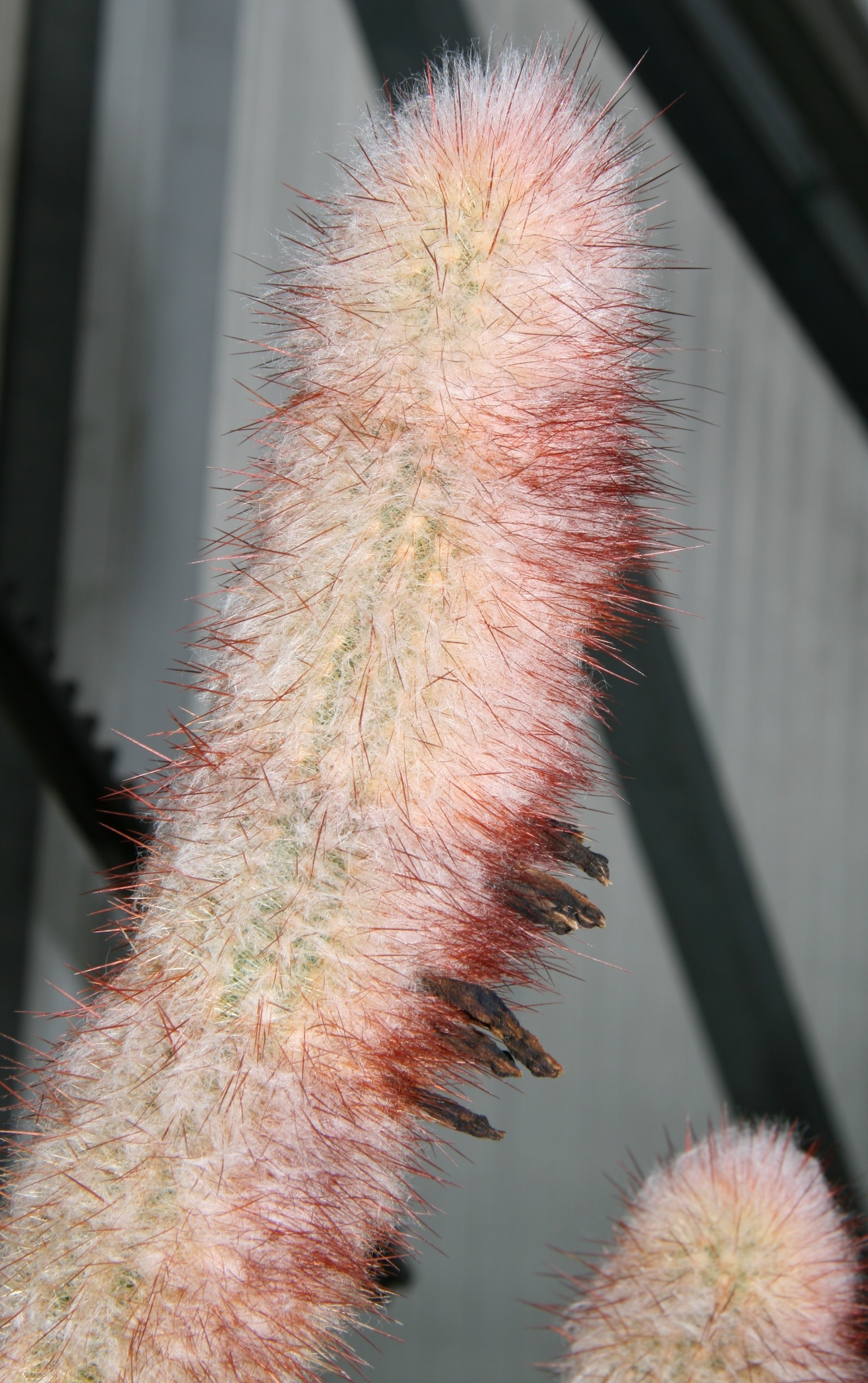

Conservation status
- Endangered (IUCN 3.1)

Scientific classification
- Kingdom: Plantae
- Clade: Tracheophytes
- Clade: Angiosperms
- Clade: Eudicots
- Order: Caryophyllales
- Family: Cactaceae
- Subfamily: Cactoideae
- Tribe: Cereeae
- Subtribe: Cereinae
- Genus: Viridicereus; Guiggi
- Species: V. violaciflorus

Binomial name
- Viridicereus violaciflorus (Buining) Guiggi

Synonyms
- Arrojadoa violaciflora (Buining) N.P.Taylor; Micranthocereus violaciflorus Buining

= Viridicereus =

Species of cactus

Viridicereus is a monotypic genus of flowering plant in the cactus family Cactaceae. Its only species is Viridicereus violaciflorus, endemic to southeast Brazil, previously known as Micranthocereus violaciflorus and Arrojadoa violaciflora.

== Description ==
Viridicereus violaciflorus typically grows with minimal or no branching, reaching heights of 1 meter, and its shoots are almost entirely covered in fine spines. The shoots can have a diameter of up to 4 centimeters and feature 11 to 16 sharp-edged ribs. Oval areoles, covered in whitish to brownish hairs, are present. The plant has a central spine up to 2.5 centimeters long and up to 25 whitish to light brown radial spines, which are often attached to the shoots. The cephalium is made up of dense white to brown wool and reddish bristles. The tubular bluish-purple flowers are up to 2.3 centimeters long, and the urn-shaped fruits are greenish-red, measuring 1 to 1.1 centimeters in length and diameter.

== Taxonomy ==
The species was first described in 1969 by Albert Frederik Hendrik Buining as Micranthocereus violaciflorus. The specific epithet violaciflorus comes from the Latin words violaceus (violet) and -florus (flowered). In 2023, a phylogenetic study found that the species did not group with other Micranthocereus species, instead forming part of a clade which also included the genera Arrojadoa and Stephanocereus. Accordingly, M. violaciflorus was transferred to Arrojadoa as Arrojadoa violaciflorus. In 2024, Alessandro Guiggi erected the monotypic genus Viridicereus for this species based on its phylogenetic position and the distinctive nature of its violet flowers and green ripe fruits. It was considered a relict species, given its rarity and restricted distribution. Guiggi's treatment is accepted by Plants of the World Online as of January 2026.

== Distribution ==
Viridicereus violaciflorus is found in the northern part of Minas Gerais, Brazil. Its natural habitats are subtropical or tropical dry shrubland and rocky areas. It is threatened by habitat loss.
