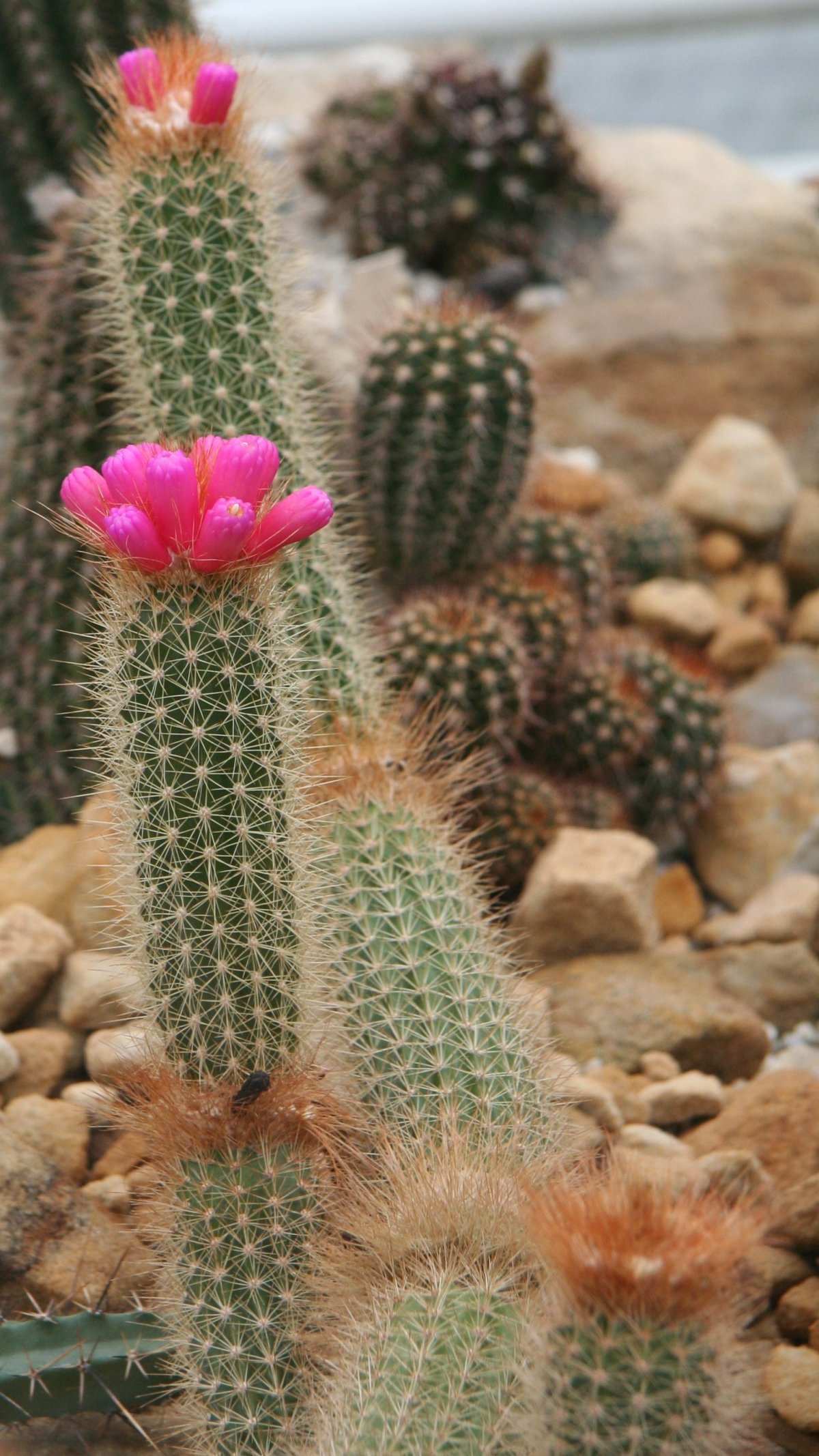

Conservation status
- Least Concern (IUCN 3.1)

Scientific classification
- Kingdom: Plantae
- Clade: Tracheophytes
- Clade: Angiosperms
- Clade: Eudicots
- Order: Caryophyllales
- Family: Cactaceae
- Subfamily: Cactoideae
- Genus: Arrojadoa
- Species: A. rhodantha

Binomial name
- Arrojadoa rhodantha (Gürke) Britton & Rose

Synonyms
- This species has 15 synonyms: (see text)

= Arrojadoa rhodantha =

Species of cactus

Arrojadoa rhodantha is a species of succulent flowering plant in the genus Arrojadoa, within the family Cactaceae. It is endemic to Brazil.

== Description ==
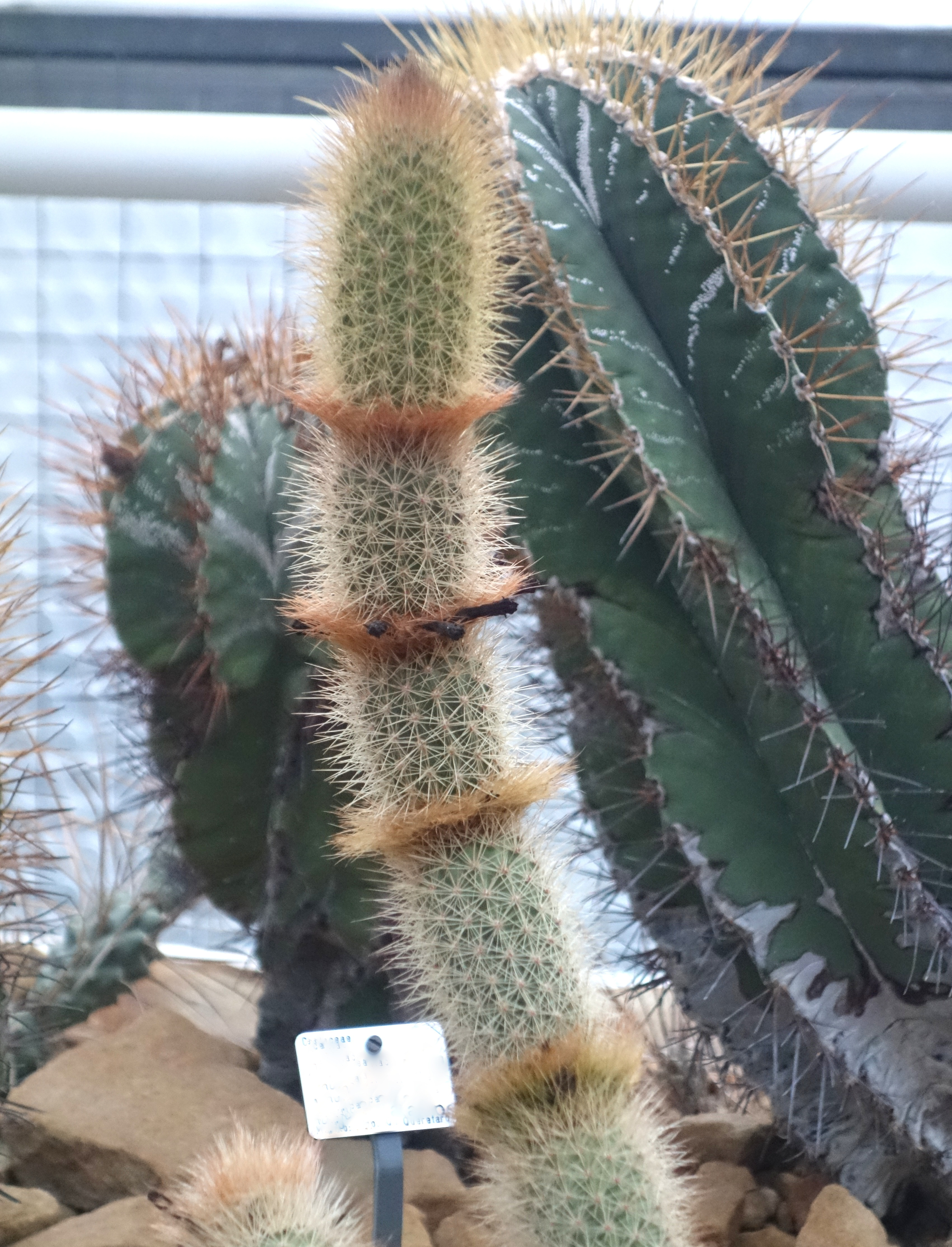
Stem

Arrojadoa rhodantha is a species of cactus with a shrubby growth form. Its stems can grow vertically or at an angle, and can reach 2 m in height. The roots are fibrous. The stems are dark green in color, cylindrical, segmented, and measuring 2-5 cm in diameter.

The stems have 10-12 very shallow ribs, and the areoles are 10-12 mm in length with spines that are white to yellow-brown in color. There are 5-6 central spines, which are strong and grow to 3 cm in length. The radial spines are approximately 20 in number per areole, and can grow to 1.2 cm in length.

The cephalia at the ends of the segments are made from brown woolly trichomes and red-brown bristles. The flowers are red-purple and magenta, and can grow to 3.5 cm in length and 1.2 cm in diameter. The fruits are spherical in shape and red in color, and can reach a diameter of 2 cm.

== Distribution and habitat ==
Arrojadoa rhodantha is native to Brazil (from southeastern Piauí to north-central Minas Gerais) and is found primarily in the seasonally-dry tropical biome. It grows in rocky areas.

== Taxonomy ==
Arrojadoa rhodantha was first described as Cereus rhodanthus, a name published in 1908 by the German botanist Robert Louis August Maximilian Gürke in the scientific journal Monatsschrift für Kakteenkunde 18: 69.

Later, the American botanists Nathaniel Lord Britton and Joseph Nelson Rose transferred this species to the genus Arrojadoa, renaming it Arrojadoa rhodantha. They registered these changes in their book The Cactaceae; descriptions and illustrations of plants of the cactus family 2: 170–171, t. 25, f. 4, t. 27, f. 1, published in 1920.

Etymology

- Arrojadoa: the genus name honors Miguel Arrojado Lisboa, the superintendent of the railways of Brazil in the time when Britton and Rose described this genus in 1920.
- rhodantha: the specific epithet is derived from the Greek words rhodos (meaning "reddish-pink") and anthos (meaning "flower"), referencing the flower color of this species.

Synonyms

- Arrojadoa aureispina Buining & Brederoo, 1972
- Arrojadoa aureispina var. anguinea P.J.Braun & Esteves, 1988
- Arrojadoa aureispina var. guanambensis P.J.Braun & Heimen, 1980
- Arrojadoa canudosensis Buining & Brederoo, 1972
- Arrojadoa horstiana P.J.Braun & Heimen, 1981
- Arrojadoa rhodantha var. anguinea (P.J.Braun & Esteves) P.J.Braun & Esteves, 1995
- Arrojadoa rhodantha subsp. aureispina (Buining & Brederoo) P.J.Braun & Esteves, 1995
- Arrojadoa rhodantha subsp. canudosensis (Buining & Brederoo) P.J.Braun, 1988
- Arrojadoa rhodantha var. guanambensis (P.J.Braun & Heimen) P.J.Braun & Esteves, 1995
- Arrojadoa rhodantha var. occibahiensis P.J.Braun, 1985
- Arrojadoa rhodantha subsp. reflexa P.J.Braun, 1983
- Arrojadoa rhodantha var. theunisseniana (Buining & Brederoo) P.J.Braun, 1988
- Arrojadoa theunisseniana Buining & Brederoo, 1973
- Cephalocereus rhodanthus (Gürke) Werderm., 1932
- Cereus rhodanthus Gürke, 1908 (Basionym)

== Conservation status ==
On the IUCN Red List, Arrojadoa rhodantha is classified as being Least Concern (LC).

== Cultivation ==
This species is primarily cultivated as an ornamental.

== Gallery ==
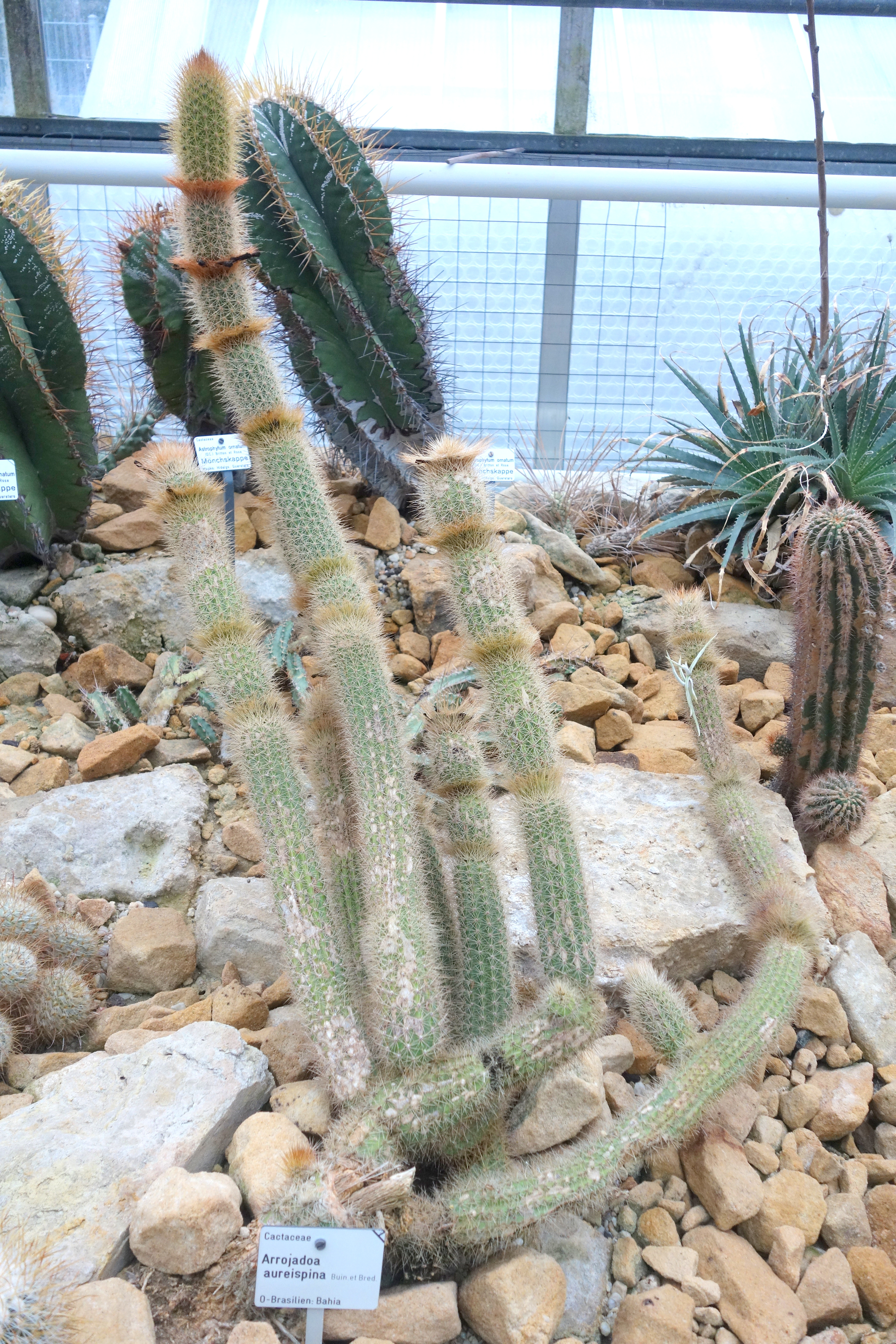
Plant size

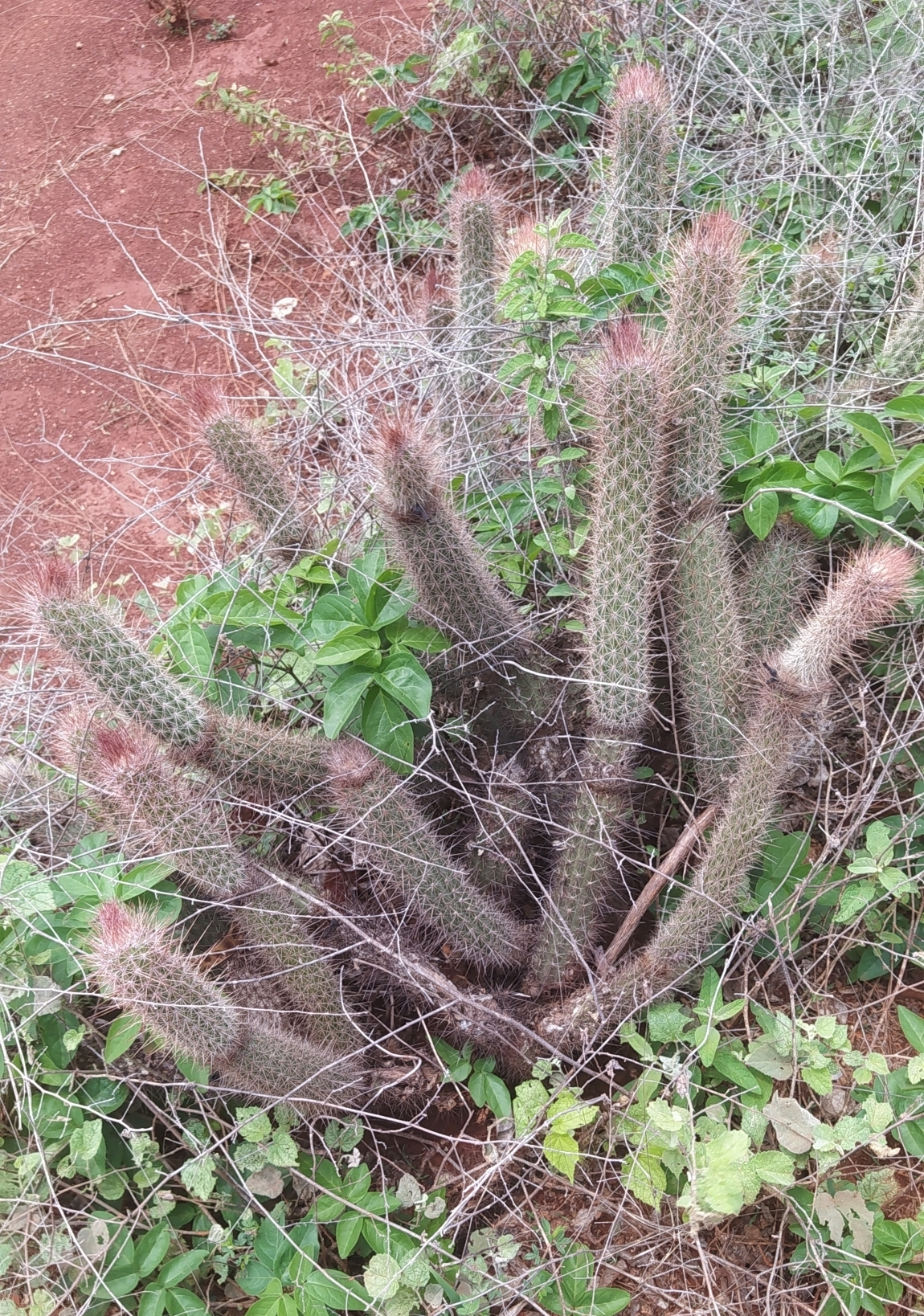
In habitat in Barro Alto, Bahia, Brazil

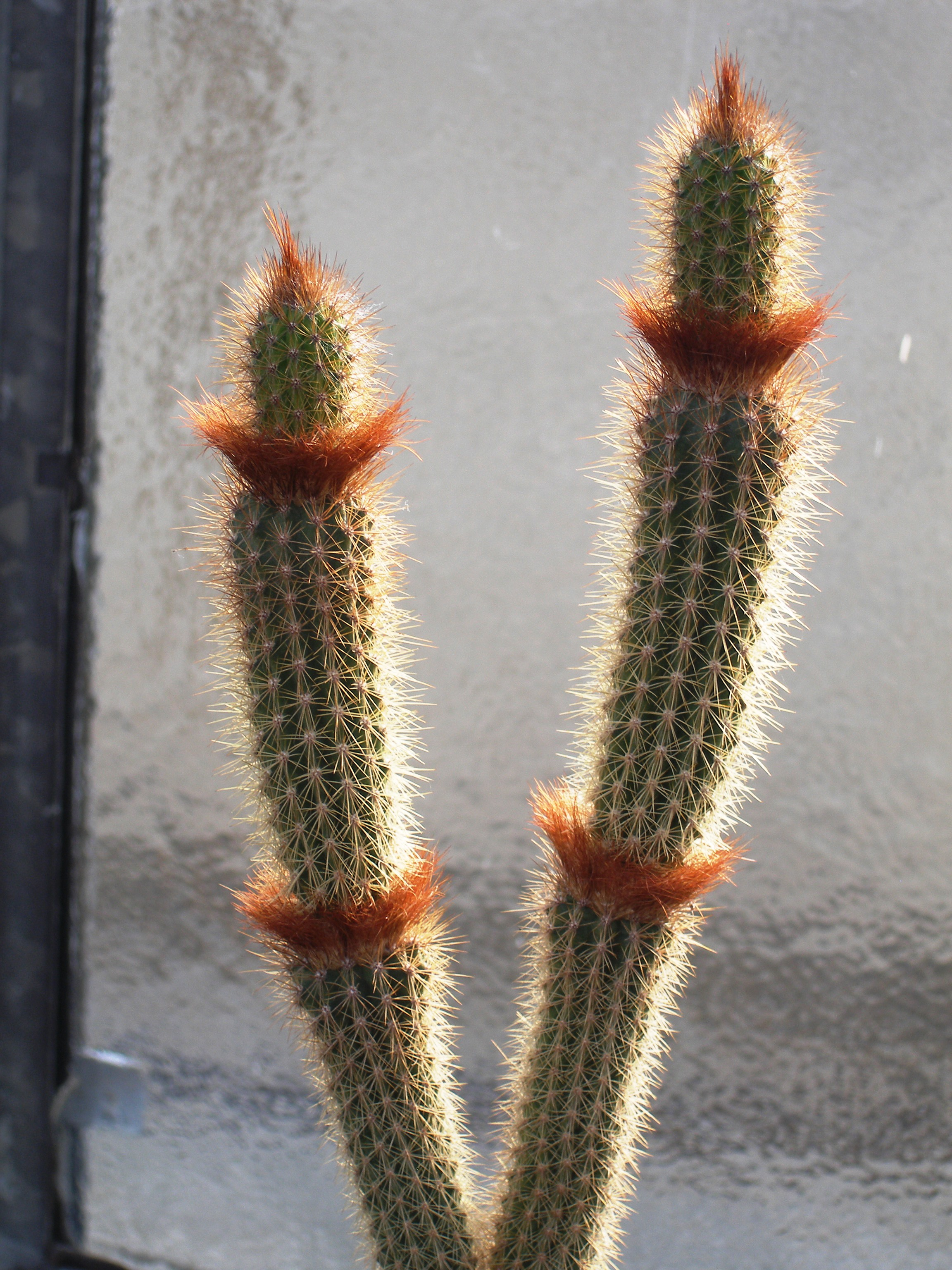
Segmented stems with cephalia

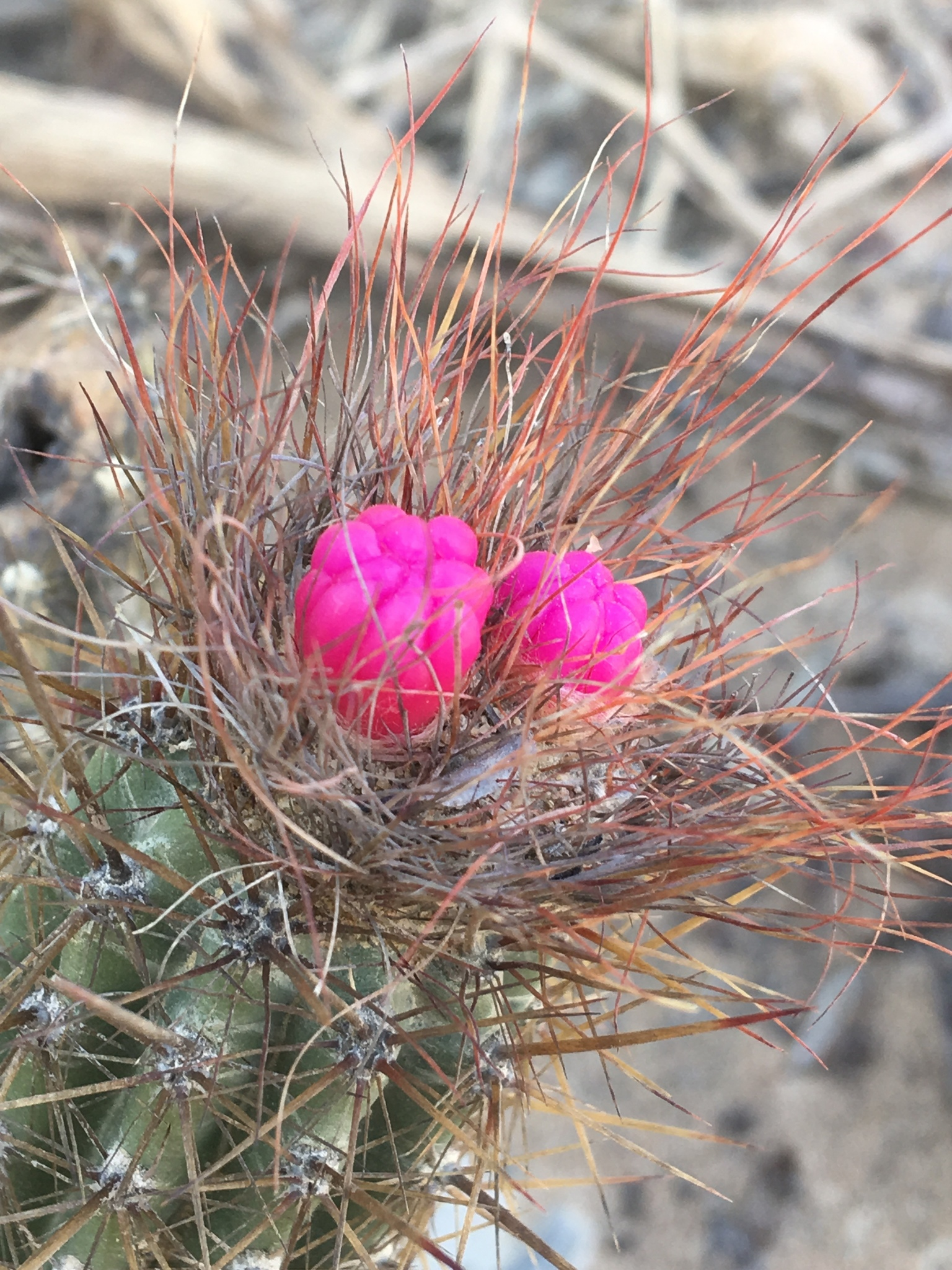
Flowers

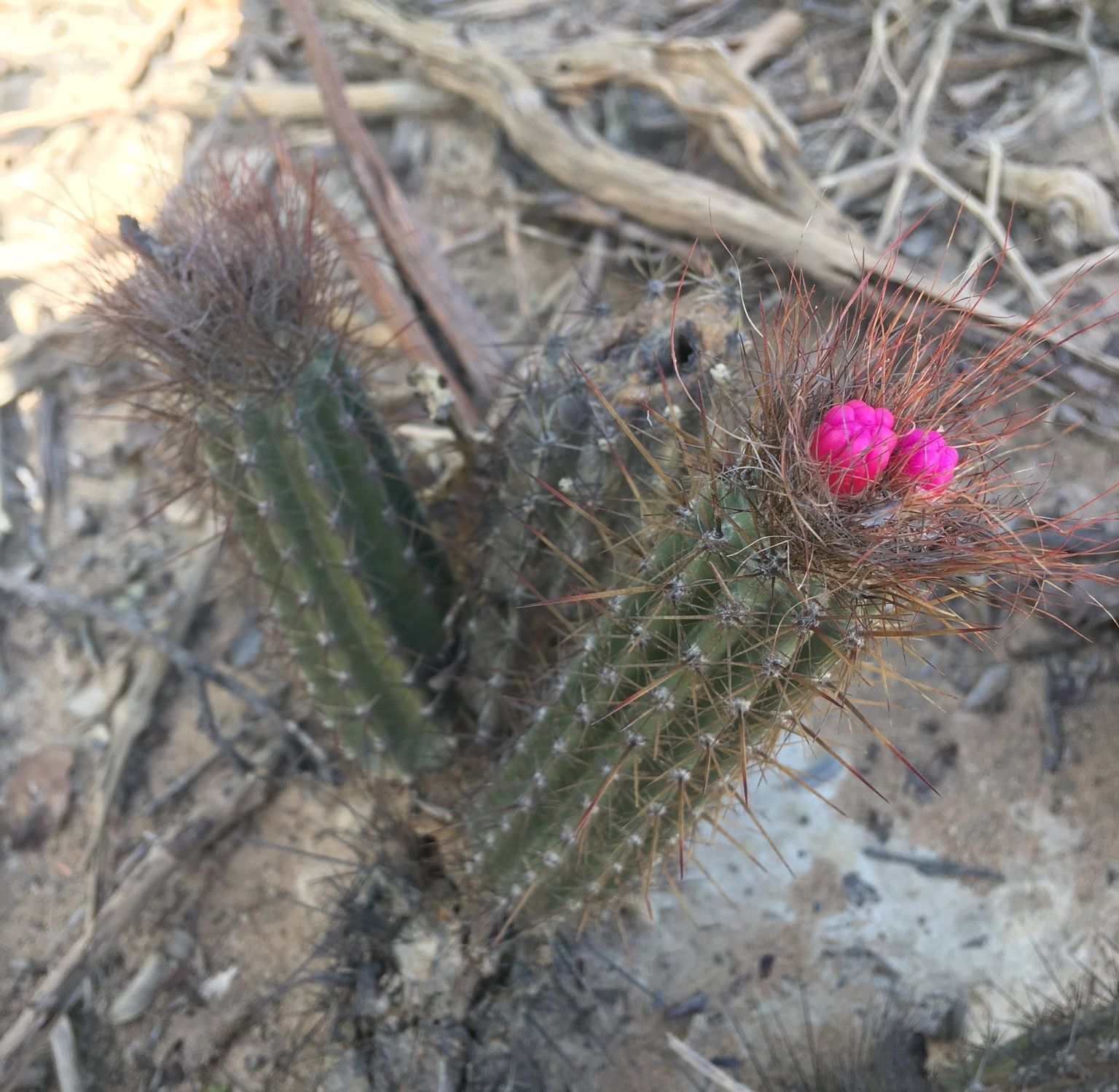
Stems
