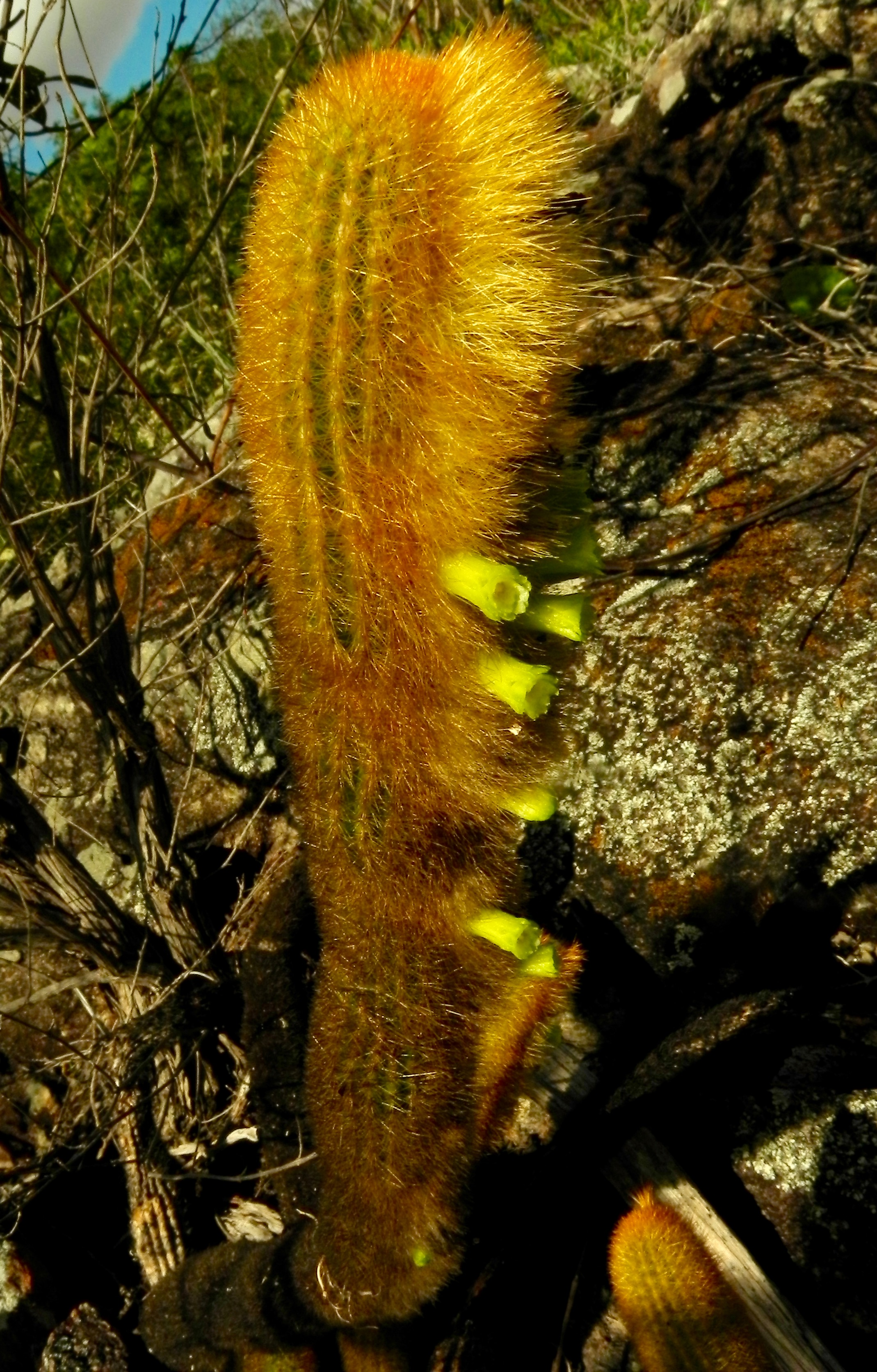

Scientific classification
- Kingdom: Plantae
- Clade: Tracheophytes
- Clade: Angiosperms
- Clade: Eudicots
- Order: Caryophyllales
- Family: Cactaceae
- Subfamily: Cactoideae
- Genus: Micranthocereus
- Species: M. aureispinus

Binomial name
- Micranthocereus aureispinus F.Ritter

= Micranthocereus aureispinus =

Species of cactus

Micranthocereus aureispinus is a species of Micranthocereus found in Brazil.
