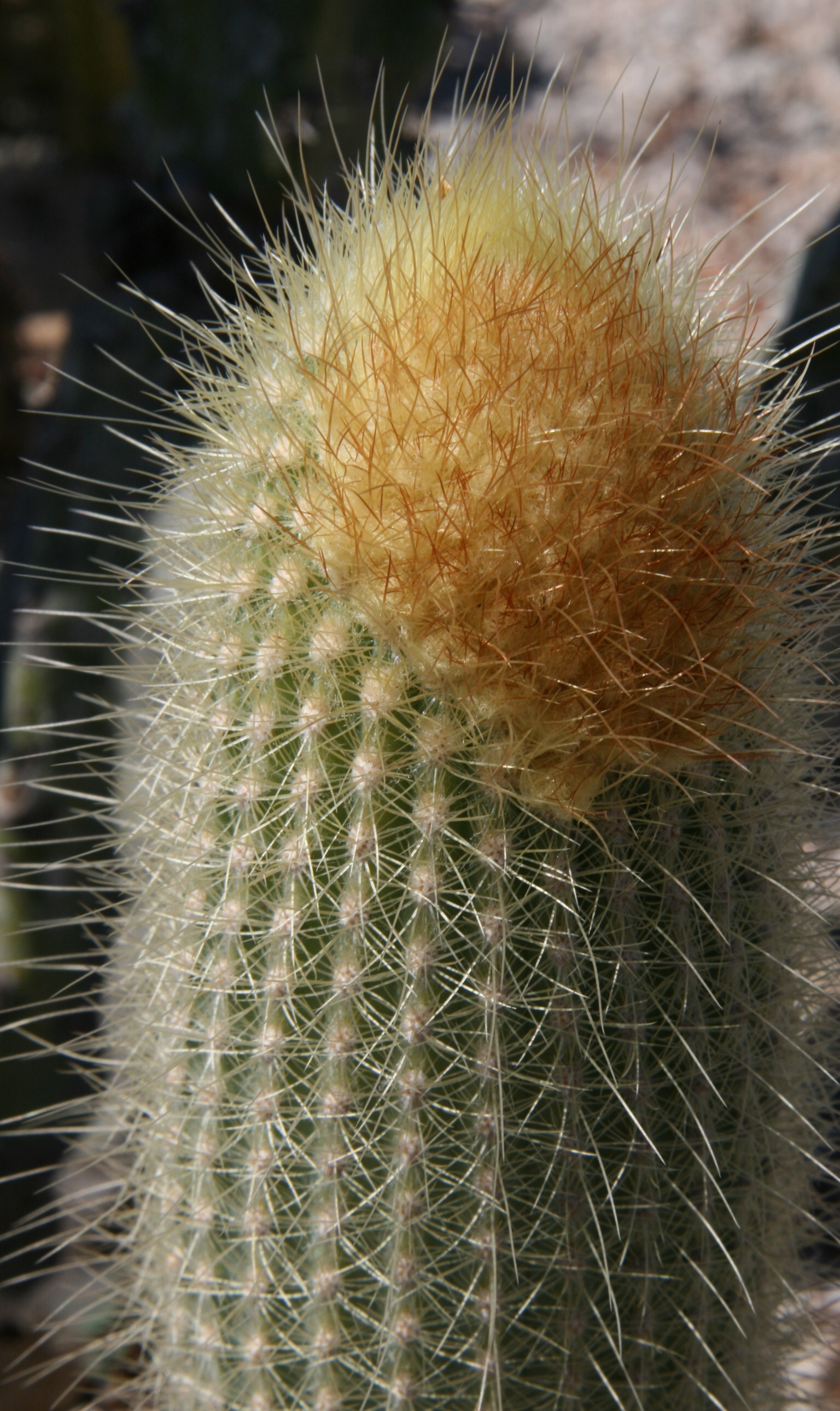

Conservation status
- Critically Endangered (IUCN 3.1)

Scientific classification
- Kingdom: Plantae
- Clade: Tracheophytes
- Clade: Angiosperms
- Clade: Eudicots
- Order: Caryophyllales
- Family: Cactaceae
- Subfamily: Cactoideae
- Genus: Micranthocereus
- Species: M. streckeri

Binomial name
- Micranthocereus streckeri Van Heek & Van Criek.

Synonyms
- Austrocephalocereus streckeri (Van Heek & Van Criek.) Mottram

= Micranthocereus streckeri =

Species of cactus

Micranthocereus streckeri is a species of plant in the family Cactaceae. It is endemic to Brazil. Its natural habitats are subtropical or tropical moist shrubland and rocky areas. It is threatened by habitat loss.

== Description ==
Micranthocereus streckeri grows branching from the base with parallel, upright, short columnar shoots and reaches heights of up to 70 centimeters. The bright blue-green to gray-green shoots later turn brownish and have a diameter of 5.5 centimeters. There are about 25 closely spaced ribs. The oval areoles are covered with brownish wool and whitish hairs. About 30 yellowish thorns up to 2.3 centimeters long and some bristles up to 10 centimeters long arise from them. The clearly pronounced cephalium is up to 20 centimeters long and 3.5 centimeters wide. It consists of yellowish brown wool up to 1.3 centimeters long and reddish brown bristles up to 2.4 centimeters long as well as some thorns.

The tubular purple flowers appear in clusters. They are up to 2.2 centimeters long and have a diameter of 4 millimeters. The berry-like fruits are purple in color and 1 to 1.1 centimeters long and diameter.

== Taxonomy ==
The first description was made in 1986 by Werner van Heek and Louis van Criekinge. The specific epithet specific epithet breiteri honors the Leverkusen cactus friend Willi Strecker.

== Distribution ==
Micranthocereus streckeri is distributed in the Brazilian state of Bahia, west of Seabra.
