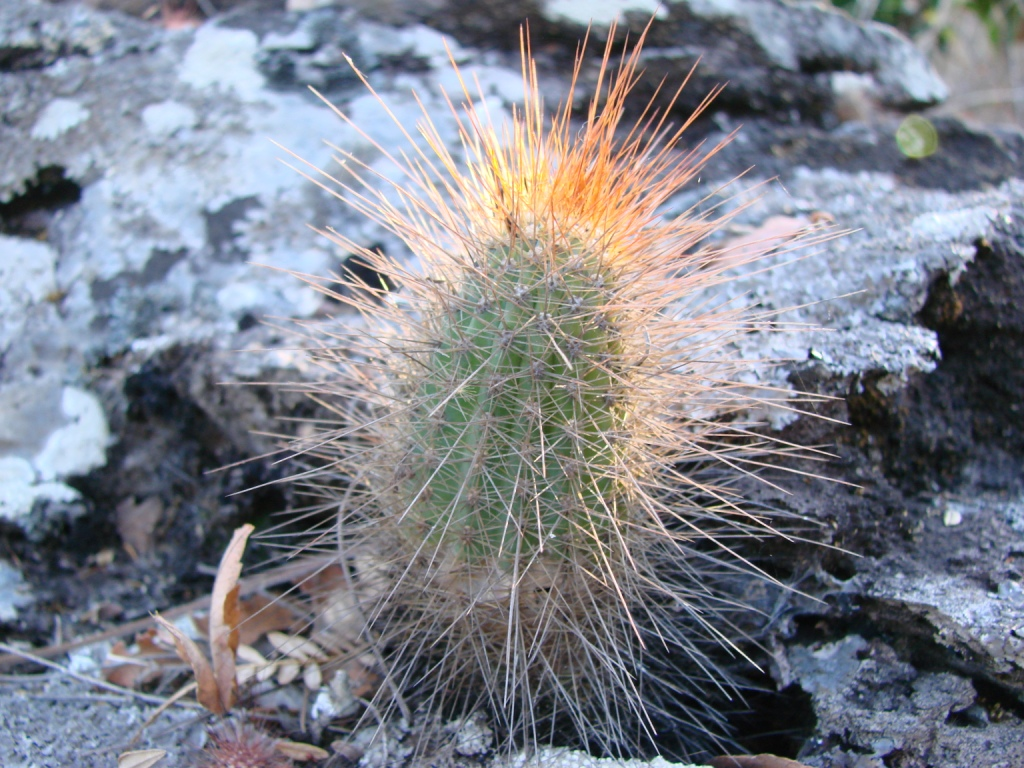
- Micranthocereus estevesii

Scientific classification
- Kingdom: Plantae
- Clade: Tracheophytes
- Clade: Angiosperms
- Clade: Eudicots
- Order: Caryophyllales
- Family: Cactaceae
- Subfamily: Cactoideae
- Tribe: Cereeae
- Subtribe: Cereinae
- Genus: Micranthocereus; Backeb.

Type species
- Micranthocereus polyanthus

Species
- See text.

Synonyms
- Austrocephalocereus Backeb.

= Micranthocereus =

Genus of cacti

Micranthocereus is genus of cactus. It originates from Brazil and includes about 10species.

The two genera Austrocephalocereus and Siccobaccatus have been brought into synonymy with this genus.

== Species ==
As of May 2025, Plants of the World Online accepted the following species:

Subgenus	Image	Scientific name	Distribution
Austrocephalocereus		Micranthocereus albicephalus	Brazil
Austrocephalocereus		Micranthocereus aureispinus F.Ritter	Brazil
Austrocephalocereus		Micranthocereus purpureus	Bahia - Brazil
Austrocephalocereus		Micranthocereus streckeri	Bahia - Brazil
Micranthocereus		Micranthocereus alvinii	Bahia - Brazil
Micranthocereus		Micranthocereus auriazureus	Brazil (Minas Gerais)
Micranthocereus		Micranthocereus flaviflorus	Bahia - Brazil
Micranthocereus		Micranthocereus hofackerianus	Bahia - Brazil
Micranthocereus		Micranthocereus polyanthus	Bahia - Brazil
