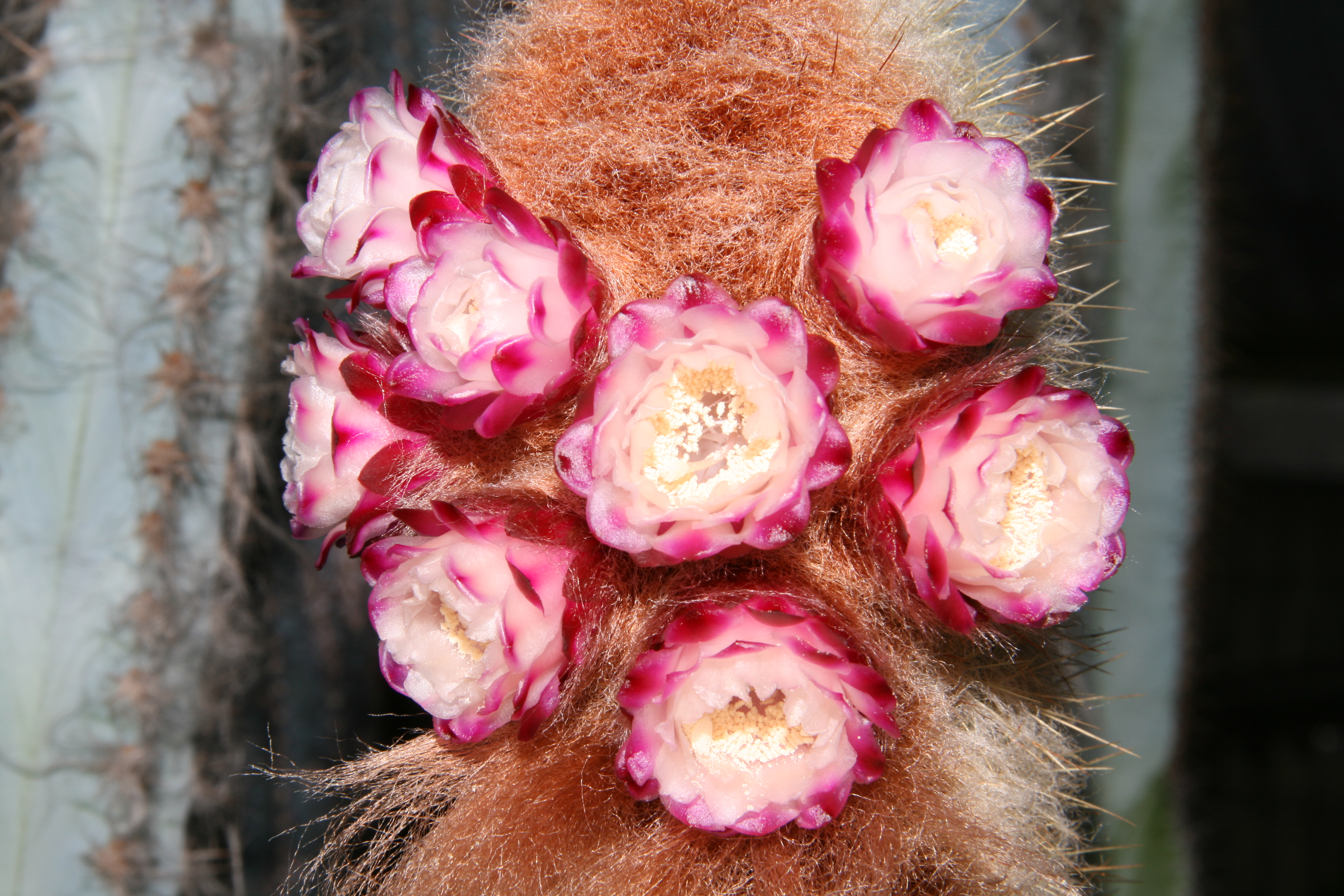

Conservation status
- Least Concern (IUCN 3.1)

Scientific classification
- Kingdom: Plantae
- Clade: Tracheophytes
- Clade: Angiosperms
- Clade: Eudicots
- Order: Caryophyllales
- Family: Cactaceae
- Subfamily: Cactoideae
- Genus: Micranthocereus
- Species: M. purpureus

Binomial name
- Micranthocereus purpureus (Gürke) F.Ritter

Synonyms
- Austrocephalocereus purpureus (Gürke) Backeb. 1942; Cephalocereus purpureus Gürke 1908; Cereus purpureus (Gürke) Luetzelb. 1926; Austrocephalocereus lehmannianus (Werderm.) Backeb. 1951; Cephalocereus lehmannianus Werderm. 1932; Coleocephalocereus lehmannianus (Werderm.) F.H.Brandt 1981; Micranthocereus haematocarpus F.Ritter 1979; Micranthocereus lehmannianus (Werderm.) F.Ritter 1968; Micranthocereus ruficeps F.Ritter 1979

= Micranthocereus purpureus =

Species of cactus

Micranthocereus purpureus is a species of Micranthocereus found in Brazil.

== Description ==
Micranthocereus purpureus typically grows unbranched with columnar shoots, reaching heights of over 3 meters and diameters up to 12 centimeters. It has 12 to 25 low, wide ribs and large, closely spaced areoles covered in white wool. The plant features 4 to 10 brown central spines up to 5 centimeters long and 15 to 20 needle-like white radial spines up to 10 millimeters long. The cephalium, up to 1 meter long and 12 centimeters wide, is composed of grayish white wool and reddish brown to black bristles up to 2 centimeters long. The flowers range from pink to white and are 4 to 5 centimeters long. The red fruits, spherical to top-shaped, grow up to 2.5 centimeters long.

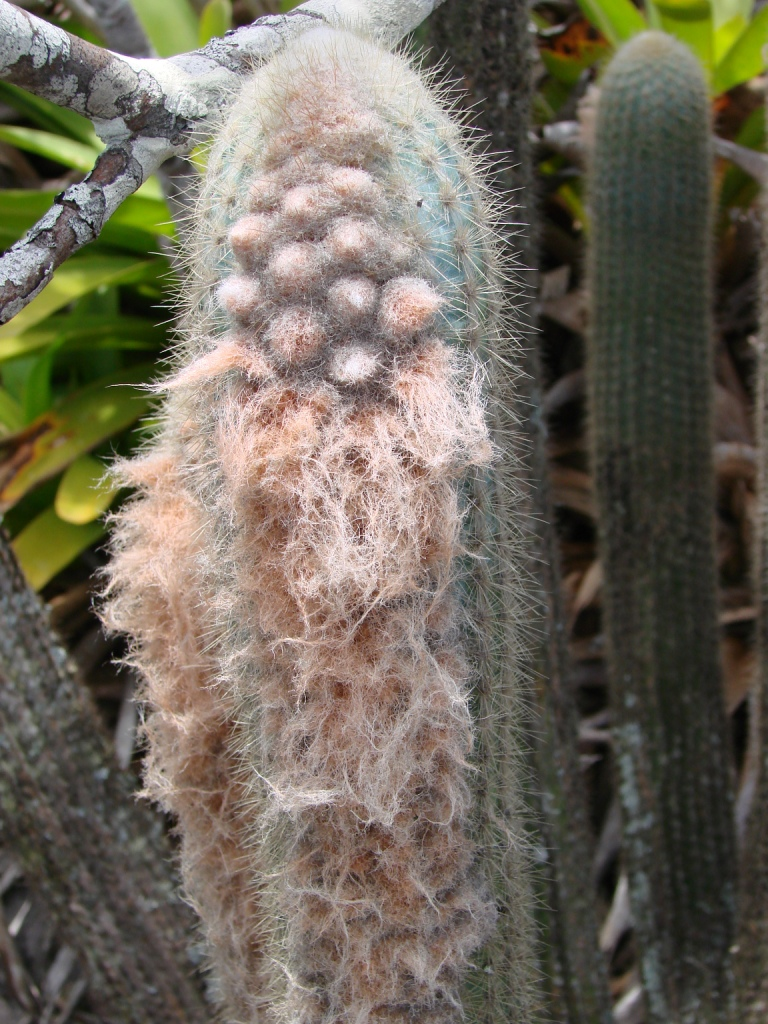
buds

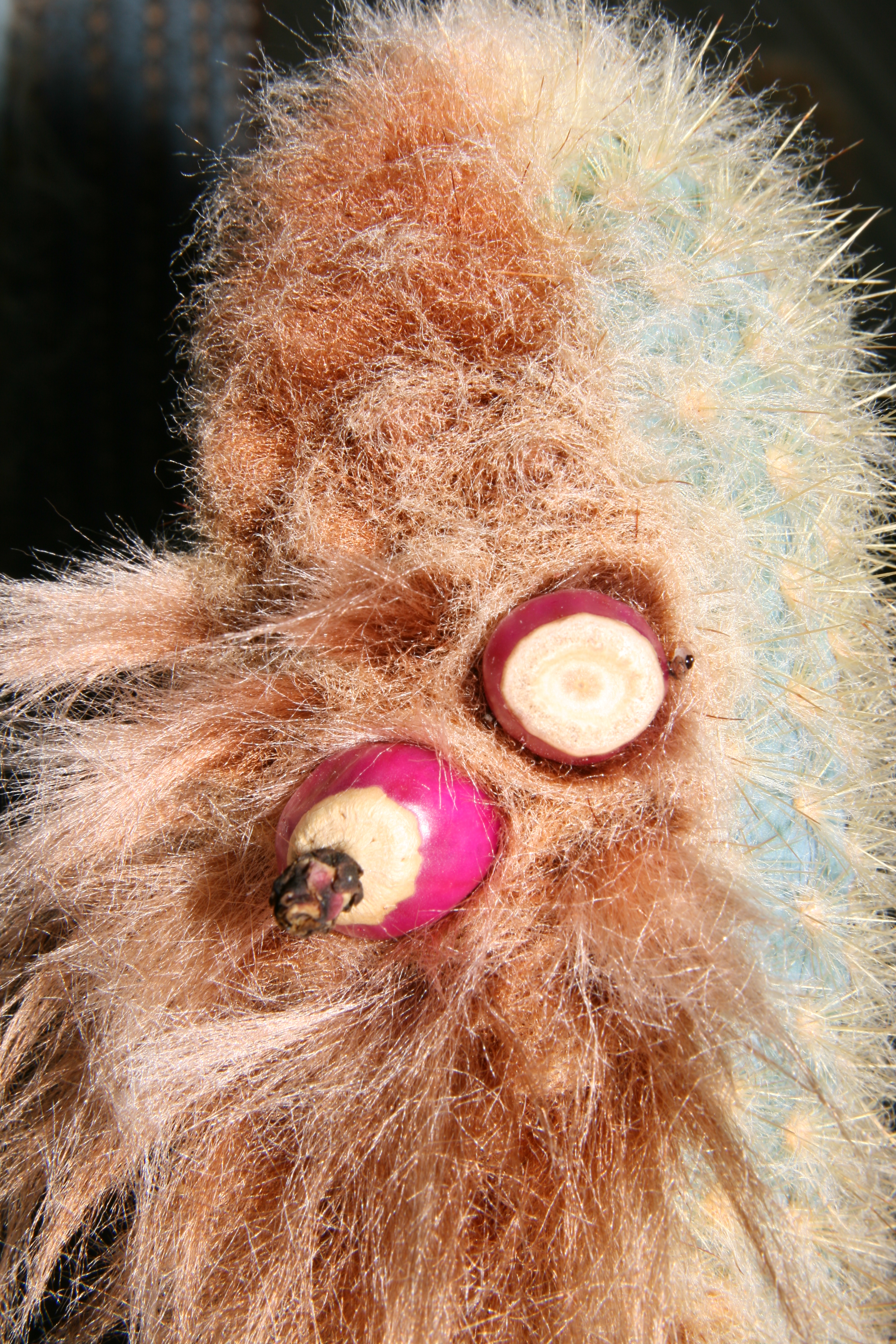
Fruit

== Distribution ==
Micranthocereus purpureus is found in the Brazilian state of Bahia.

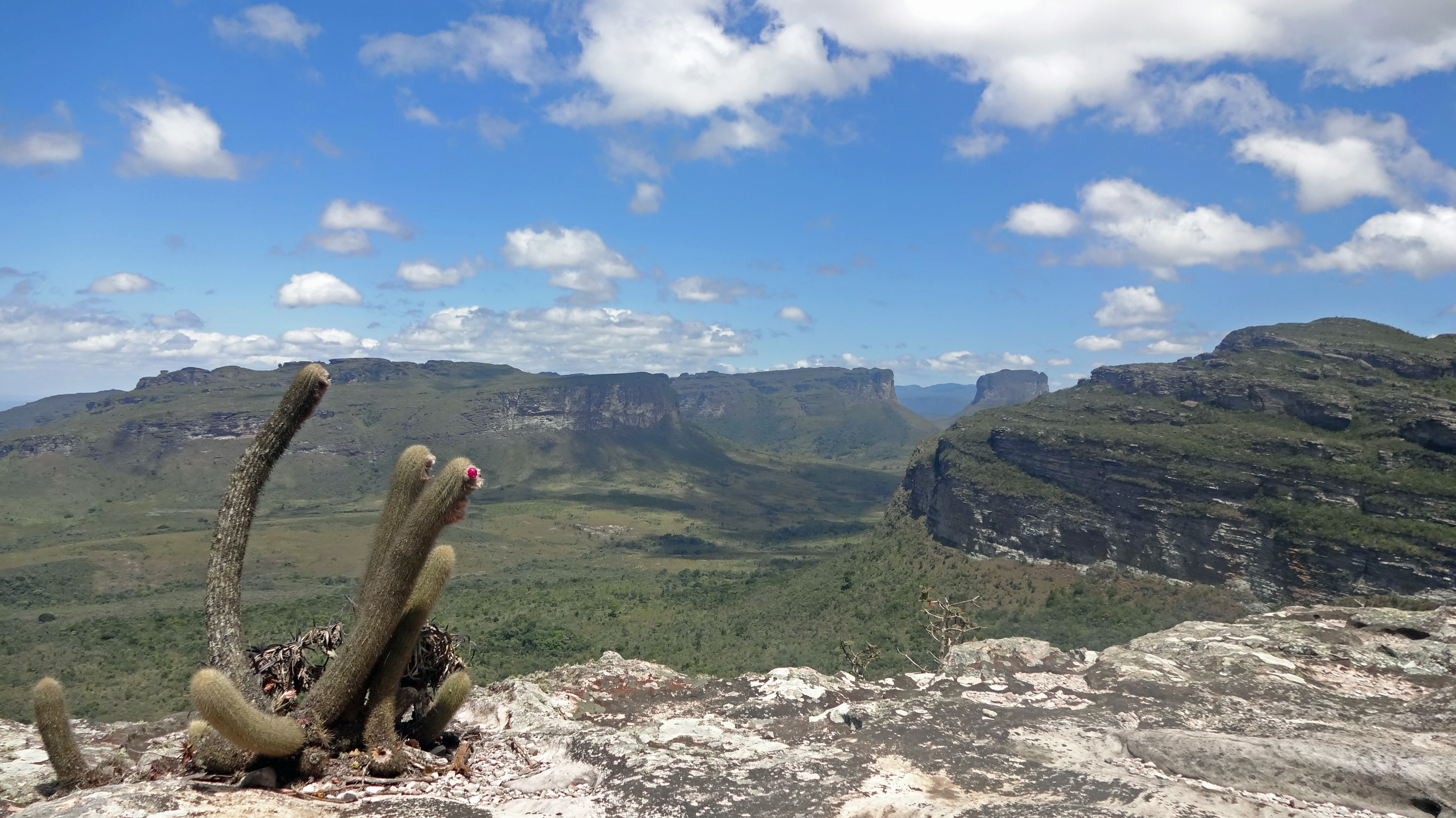
Plant growing in Parque Nacional da Chapada Diamantina, Palmeiras

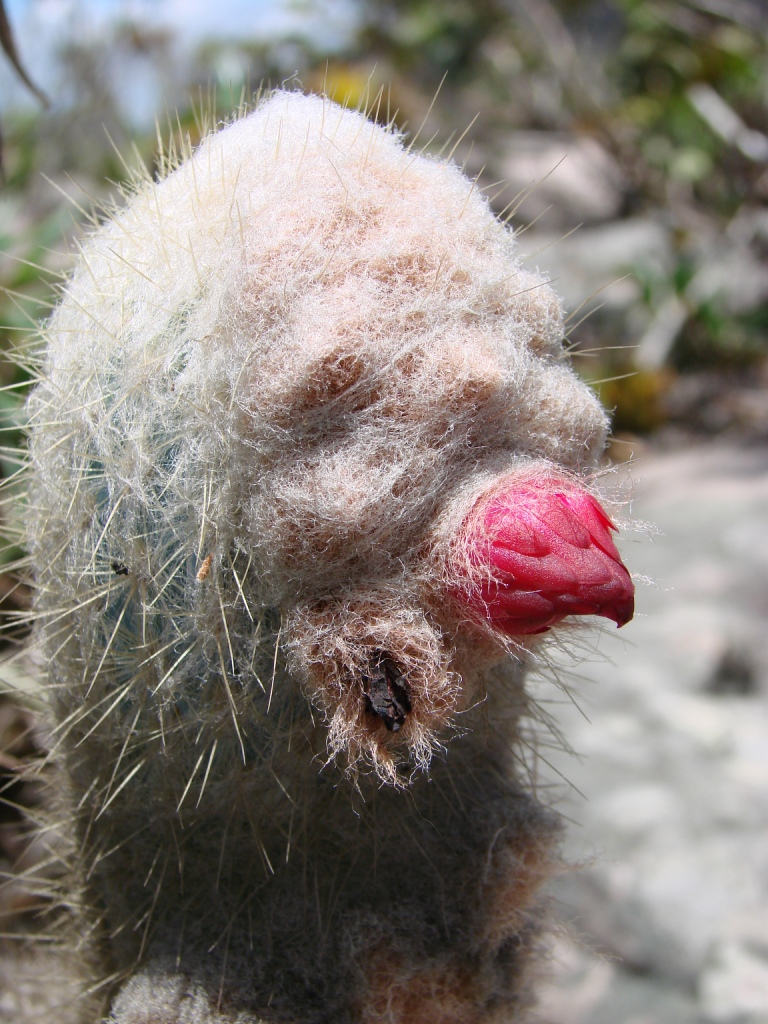
Plant blooming in Parque Natural Municipal Morro do Pai Inácio, Palmeiras

== Taxonomy ==
It was first described as Cephalocereus purpureus by Max Gürke in 1908. The specific epithet purpureus, meaning 'purple' in Latin, refers to the flower color. Friedrich Ritter reclassified the species into the genus Micranthocereus in 1968.
