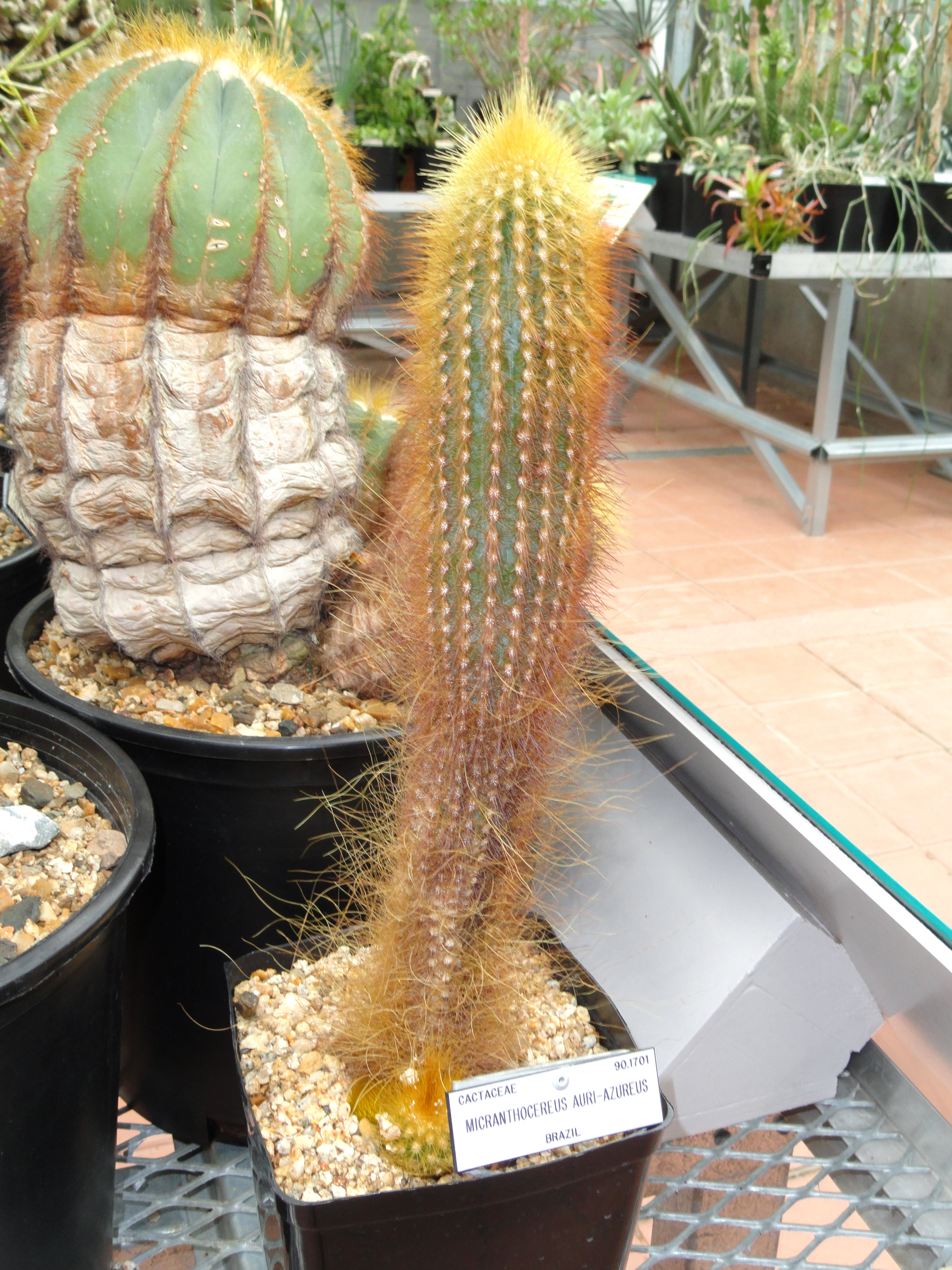

Conservation status
- Endangered (IUCN 3.1)

Scientific classification
- Kingdom: Plantae
- Clade: Tracheophytes
- Clade: Angiosperms
- Clade: Eudicots
- Order: Caryophyllales
- Family: Cactaceae
- Subfamily: Cactoideae
- Genus: Micranthocereus
- Species: M. auriazureus

Binomial name
- Micranthocereus auriazureus Buining & Brederoo

= Micranthocereus auriazureus =

Species of cactus

Micranthocereus auriazureus is a species of cactus. It is endemic to Brazil, where it is known only from Minas Gerais.
