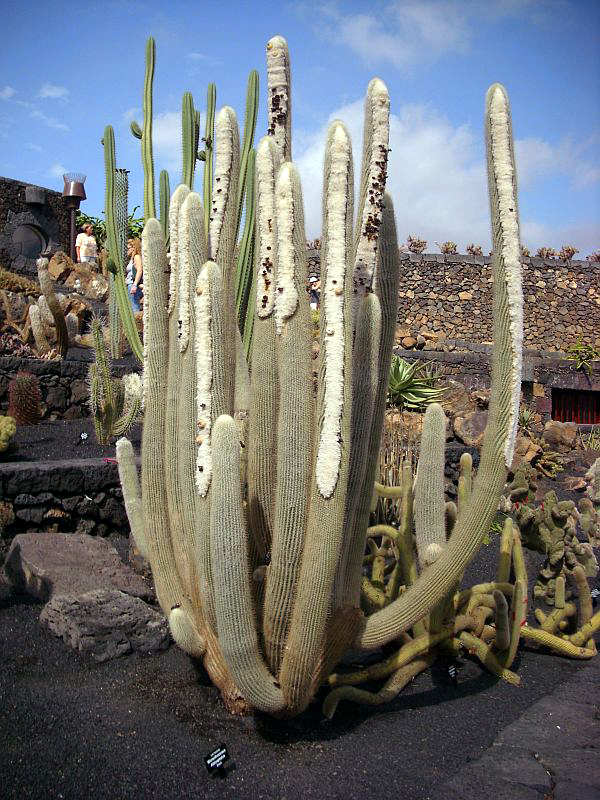

Conservation status
- Vulnerable (IUCN 3.1)

Scientific classification
- Kingdom: Plantae
- Clade: Tracheophytes
- Clade: Angiosperms
- Clade: Eudicots
- Order: Caryophyllales
- Family: Cactaceae
- Subfamily: Cactoideae
- Genus: Micranthocereus
- Species: M. albicephalus

Binomial name
- Micranthocereus albicephalus (Buining & Brederoo) F.Ritter

= Micranthocereus albicephalus =

Species of cactus

Micranthocereus albicephalus is a species of plant in the family Cactaceae. It is endemic to Brazil. Its natural habitats are subtropical or tropical dry shrubland and rocky areas. It is threatened by habitat loss.

== Description ==
Micranthocereus albicephalus grows branches from the base with columnar, green shoots and reaches heights of growth of up to 2.5 meters. The shoots have a diameter of up to 9 centimeters. There are up to 22 ribs. The areoles, which are 3 to 5 millimeters apart, are covered with light yellow wool and white hair. Numerous straight, up to 15 millimeters long, thin, prickly, golden-yellow thorns arise from them, one of which points downwards. The 30 to 40 centimeters long and 8 to 9 centimeters wide cephalium consists of dense white wool and golden yellow bristles up to 6 centimeters long.

The companulated flowers are white and open at night. They are 4.5 to 5 centimeters long. The spherical fruits reach a diameter of 3 to 3.5 centimeters.
