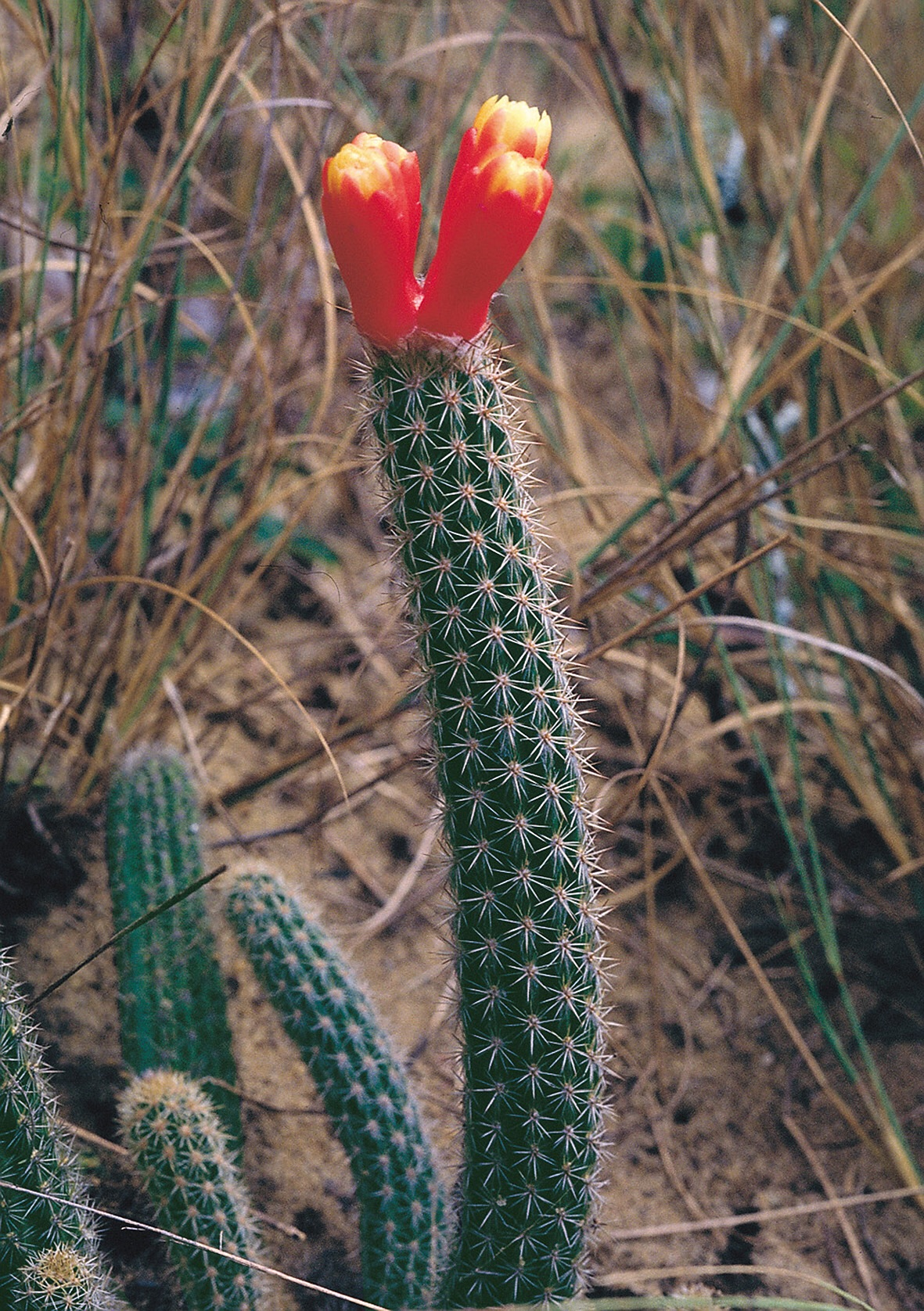

Conservation status
- Vulnerable (IUCN 3.1)

Scientific classification
- Kingdom: Plantae
- Clade: Tracheophytes
- Clade: Angiosperms
- Clade: Eudicots
- Order: Caryophyllales
- Family: Cactaceae
- Subfamily: Cactoideae
- Genus: Arrojadoa
- Species: A. dinae

Binomial name
- Arrojadoa dinae Buining & Brederoo

= Arrojadoa dinae =

Species of cactus

Arrojadoa dinae is a species of plant in the family Cactaceae. It is endemic to Brazil. Its natural habitat is dry savanna. It is threatened by habitat loss.

The main threats are deforestation for Eucalyptus plantations used for charcoal production. Collection of the plant and fires can impact on its reproductive capacity.
