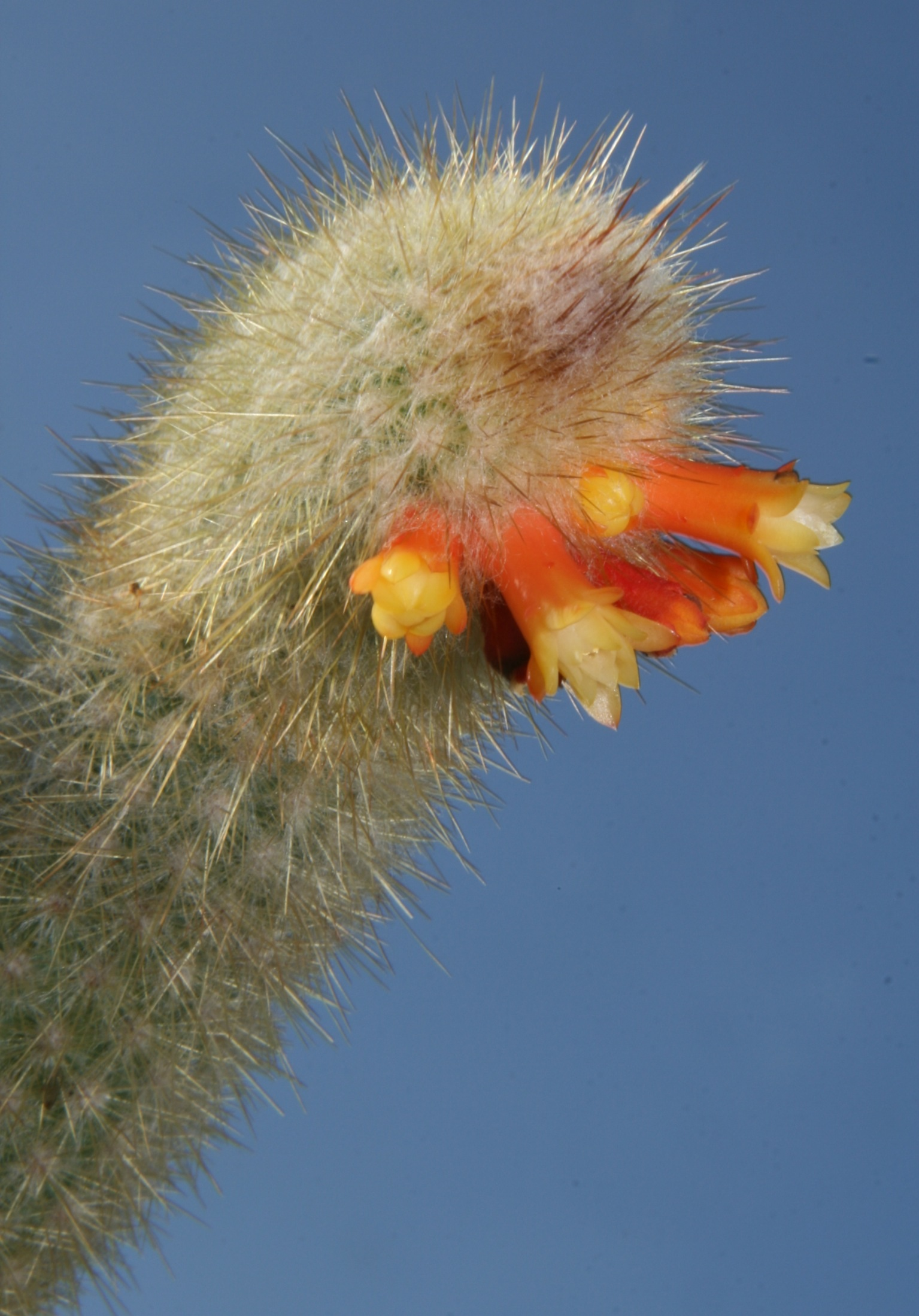

Conservation status
- Near Threatened (IUCN 3.1)

Scientific classification
- Kingdom: Plantae
- Clade: Tracheophytes
- Clade: Angiosperms
- Clade: Eudicots
- Order: Caryophyllales
- Family: Cactaceae
- Subfamily: Cactoideae
- Genus: Micranthocereus
- Species: M. flaviflorus

Binomial name
- Micranthocereus flaviflorus Buining & Brederoo

Synonyms
- Micranthocereus densiflorus Buining & Brederoo 1974; Micranthocereus flaviflorus subsp. densiflorus (Buining & Brederoo) P.J.Braun & Esteves 1995; Micranthocereus flaviflorus var. uilianus (Brederoo & C.A.L.Bercht) P.J.Braun & Esteves 1995; Micranthocereus flaviflorus subsp. uilianus (Brederoo & C.A.L.Bercht) P.J.Braun & Esteves 2008; Micranthocereus uilianus Brederoo & C.A.L.Bercht 1984

= Micranthocereus flaviflorus =

Species of cactus

Micranthocereus flaviflorus is a species of Micranthocereus found in Brazil.

== Description ==
Micranthocereus flaviflorus is a branching cactus that grows from its base, forming columnar, bluish-green shoots up to 75 cm tall and 4 cm in diameter. These shoots are characterized by approximately 16 slightly humped ribs. The oval areoles are densely covered with white wool that ages to gray, and bear hairs up to 1 cm long. The spines initially emerge yellowish-brown, becoming dirty white with age. There are about nine central spines, 0.6-1.3 cm long, with one more robust central spine reaching up to 2 cm. Numerous translucent radial spines are up to 5 mm long. The cephalium, a specialized flowering structure, is composed of white wool and hair-like spines up to 1 cm long. The tubular flowers are red to pinkish-red, or bright cream to yellowish, measuring up to 1.8 cm long and 6 mm in diameter. The bright red, berry-like fruits are 7-8 mm long and have a similar diameter.

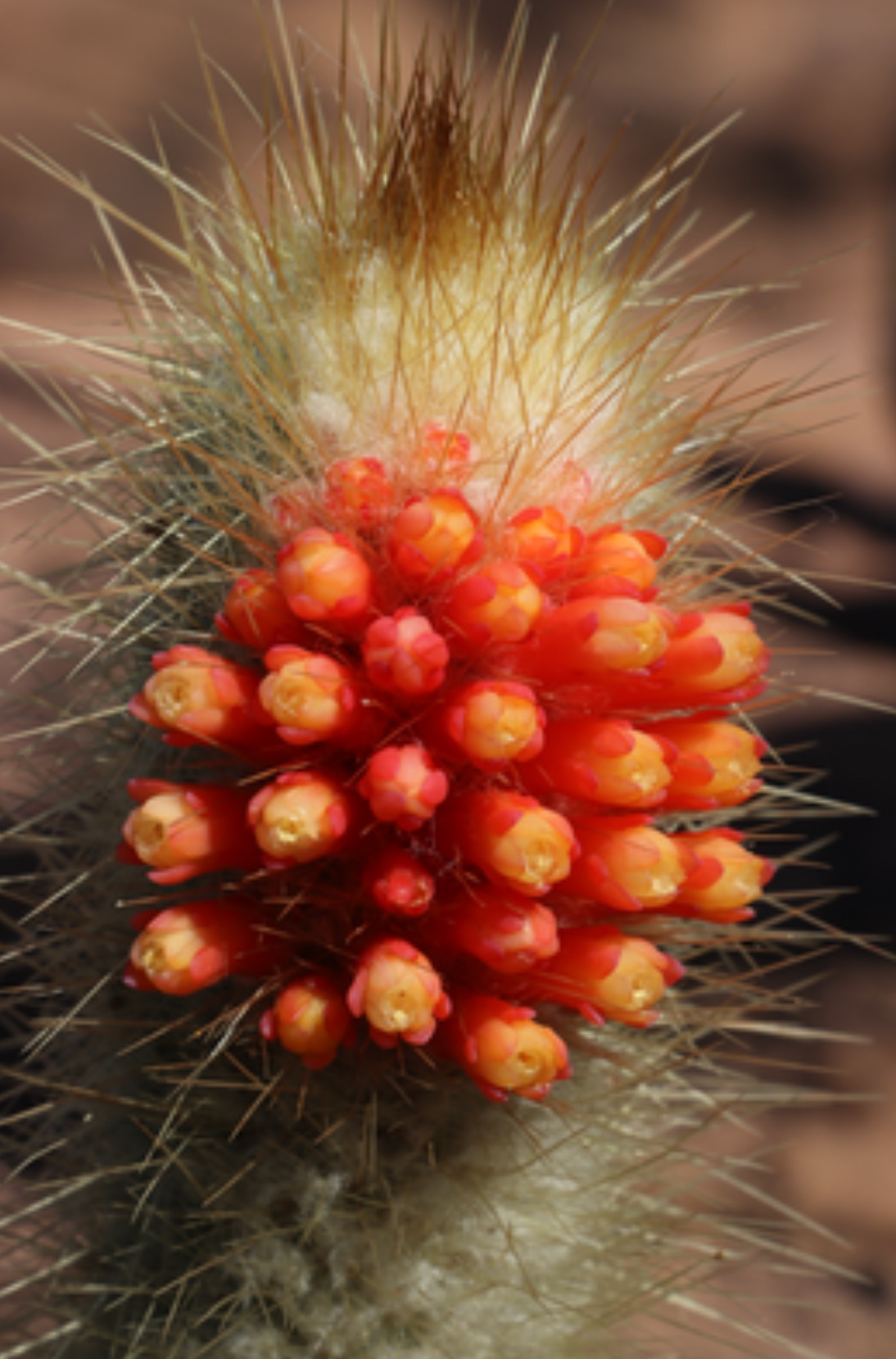
Flowers

== Distribution ==
Micranthocereus flaviflorus is native to the Brazilian state of Bahia.

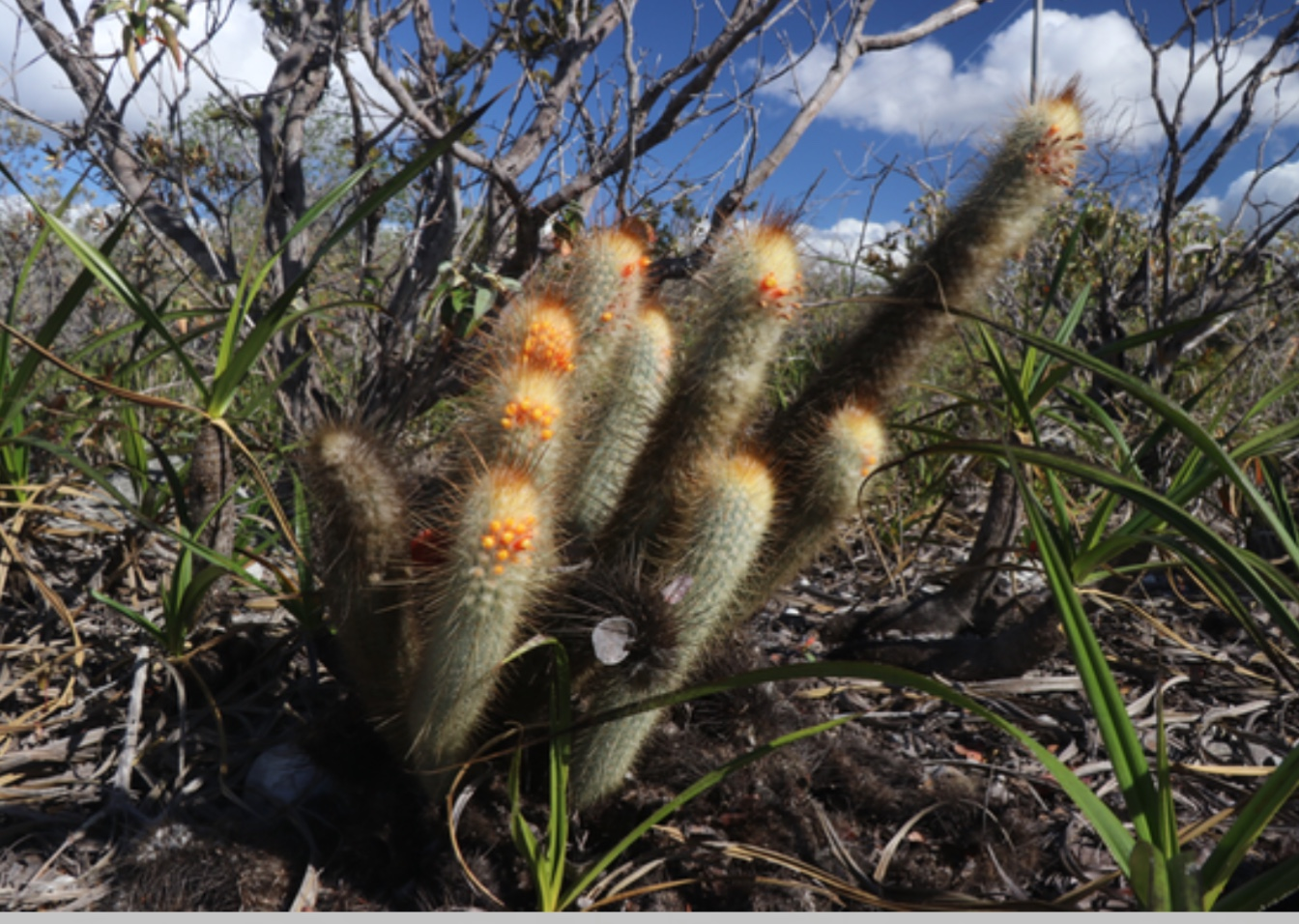
Plant growing in Bahia

== Taxonomy ==
It was first described in 1974 by Albert Frederik Hendrik Buining and Arnold J. Brederoo. The species name, flaviflorus, is derived from the Latin words flavidus ('yellow') and -florus ('-flowered'), referring to its yellow or cream-colored flowers.
