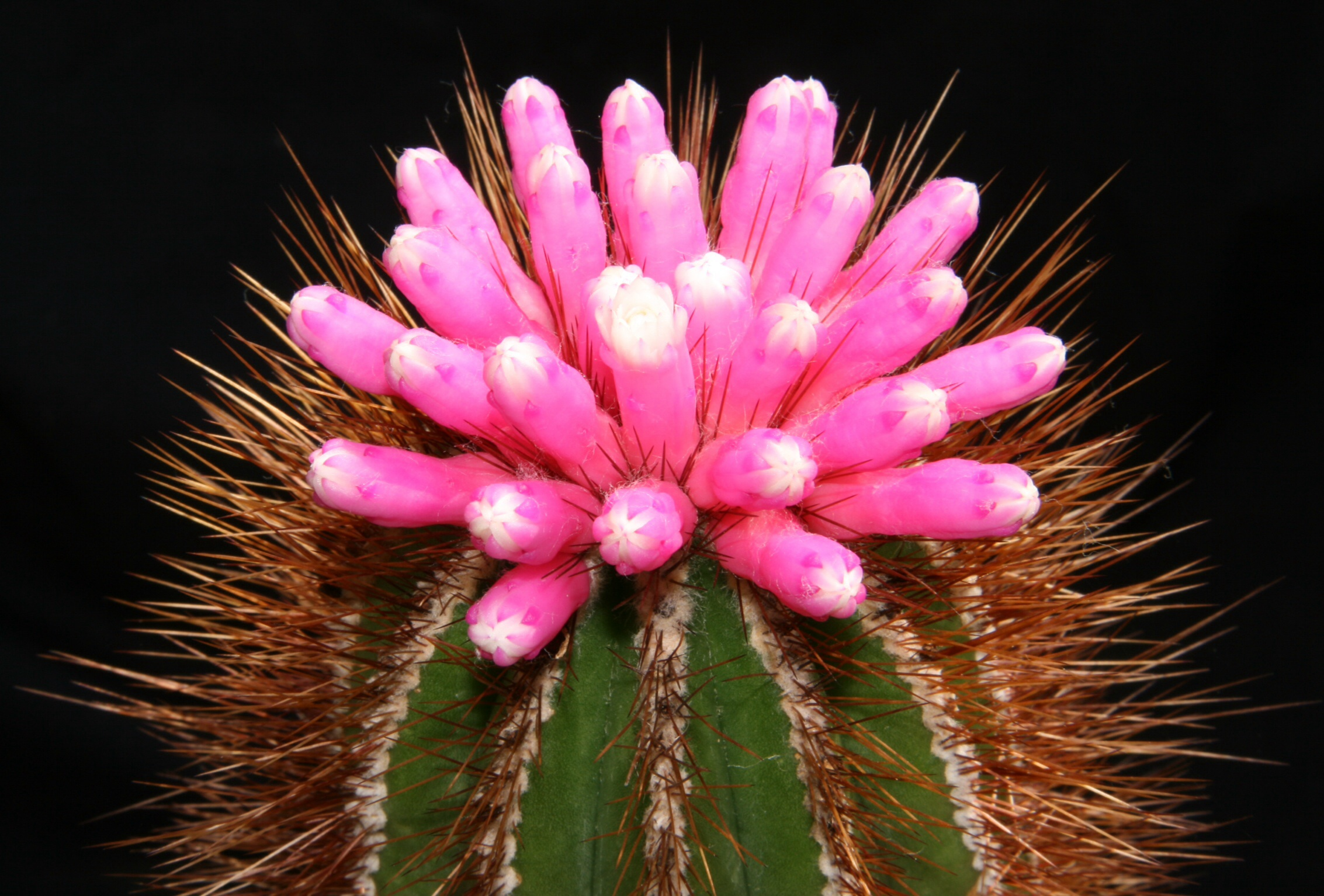

Conservation status
- Vulnerable (IUCN 3.1)

Scientific classification
- Kingdom: Plantae
- Clade: Tracheophytes
- Clade: Angiosperms
- Clade: Eudicots
- Order: Caryophyllales
- Family: Cactaceae
- Subfamily: Cactoideae
- Genus: Pierrebraunia; Esteves
- Species: P. bahiensis

Binomial name
- Pierrebraunia bahiensis P.J.Braun & Esteves

Synonyms
- Floribunda bahiensis P.J.Braun & Esteves; Arrojadoa bahiensis ((P.J.Braun & Esteves) N.P.Taylor & Eggli

= Pierrebraunia =

Species of cactus

Pierrebraunia is a genus of flowering plant in the cactus family Cactaceae. Its only species is Pierrebraunia bahiensis, endemic to Brazil. Its natural habitat is rocky areas.

== Description ==
Pierrebraunia bahiensis is a solitary cactus characterized by its green to gray-green shoots, which are spherical to cylindrical in shape. These shoots can grow up to 1.1 meters tall and have a diameter of 8 centimeters. They feature 9 to 14 rounded vertical ribs. Initially, the round areoles are covered with cream-colored wool, but they eventually become bare. The spines are finely needle-shaped and somewhat flexible, varying in color from yellowish to reddish, eventually turning gray. Each shoot has a central spine that can be up to 3 centimeters long, along with 6 to 11 radial spines that can reach up to 1.6 centimeters long, with older areoles containing as many as 23 spines that are either erect or spreading.

The cactus produces tubular pink flowers that appear near the top and along the upper sections of the shoots. These flowers measure between 3.2 and 3.9 centimeters in length and have a diameter of 8 to 10 millimeters, with white inner bracts. The fruits are round to egg-shaped, pink in color, and have a diameter ranging from 1 to 3 centimeters.

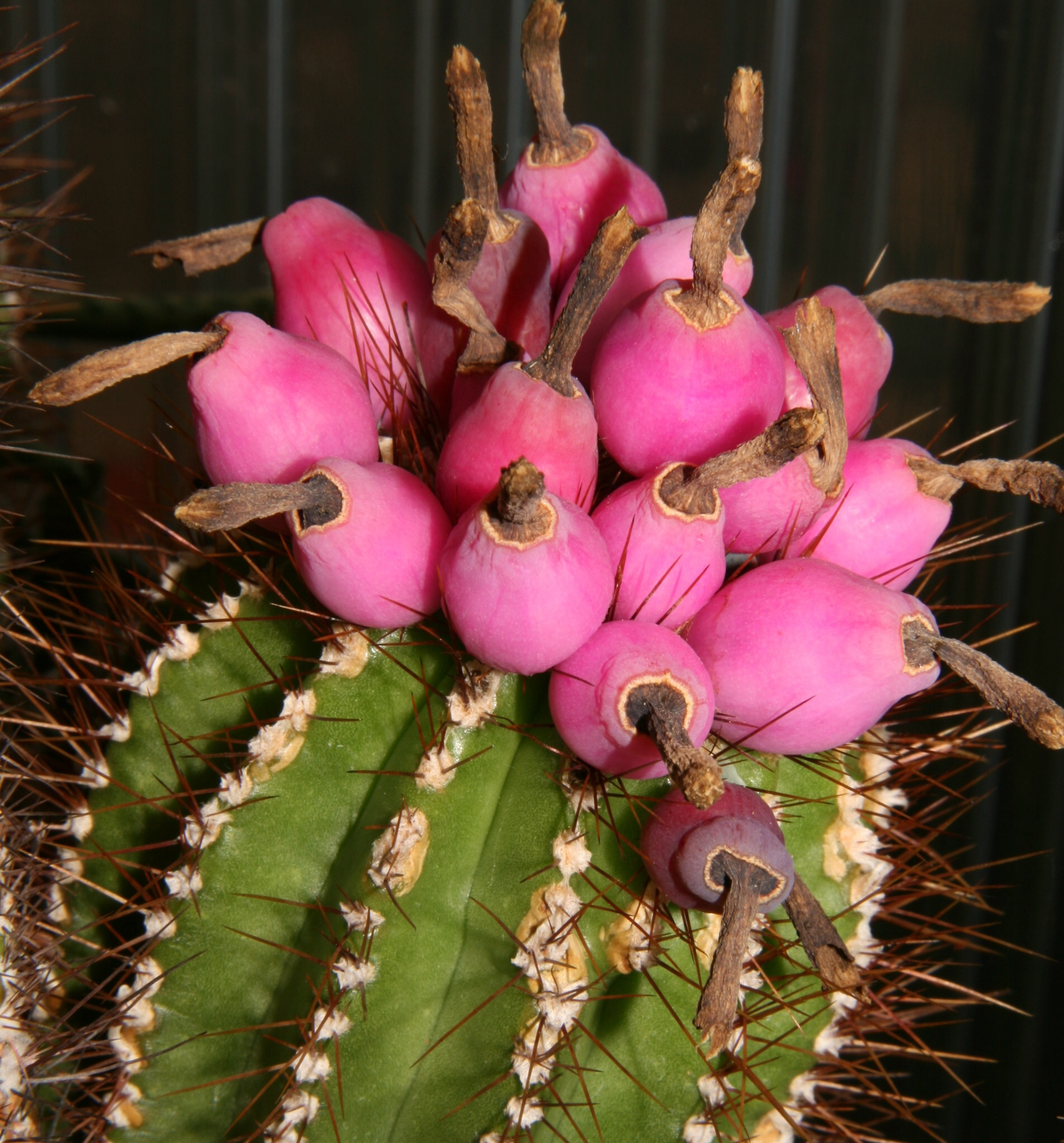
fruits

== Taxonomy ==
The species was first discovered in 1981. It was initially described as Floribunda bahiensis in 1993 by Pierre Josef Braun and Eddie Esteves Pereira. The specific name bahiensis reflects its native range in Bahia. The genus Pierrebraunia was first described by Eddie Esteves Pereira in 1997 for Floribunda bahiensis. In 1994, Nigel Paul Taylor and Urs Eggli reclassified the species in the genus Arrojadoa. As of January 2026, Plants of the World Online retained it in the genus Pierrebraunia.

=== Subspecies ===
Accepted subspecies:

Image	Subspecies	Distribution
	Pierrebraunia bahiensis subsp. bahiensis	Brazil (Bahia)
	Pierrebraunia bahiensis subsp. flava (Gonzaga & Engels) N.P.Taylor 2024	Brazil (Bahia)

=== Formerly included species ===
- Pierrebraunia eddie-estevesii = Pilosocereus eddie-estevesii
- Pierrebraunia brauniorum = Pilosocereus brauniorum

== Distribution ==
Pierrebraunia bahiensis is found in the Chapada Diamantina region of Bahia, Brazil, at altitudes between 1,000 and 1,950 meters growing in quartzitic and sandstone soil.
