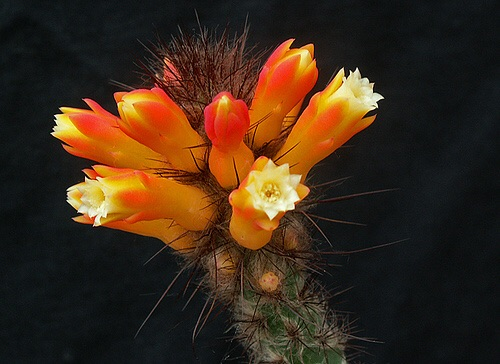

Scientific classification
- Kingdom: Plantae
- Clade: Tracheophytes
- Clade: Angiosperms
- Clade: Eudicots
- Order: Caryophyllales
- Family: Cactaceae
- Subfamily: Cactoideae
- Genus: Micranthocereus
- Species: M. hofackerianus

Binomial name
- Micranthocereus hofackerianus (P.J.Braun & Esteves) M.Machado

= Micranthocereus hofackerianus =

Species of cactus

Micranthocereus hofackerianus is a species of Micranthocereus found in Brazil.
