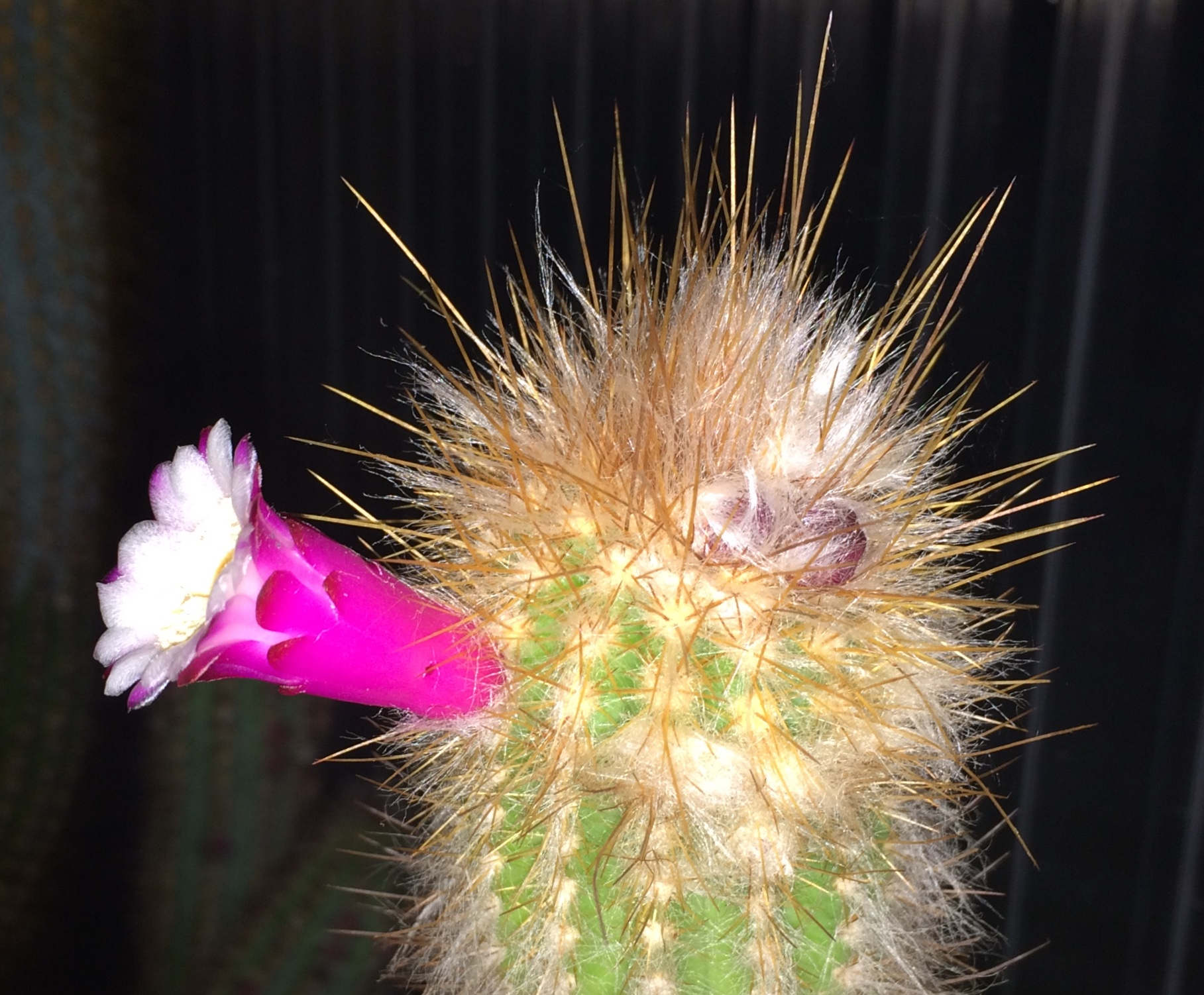

Scientific classification
- Kingdom: Plantae
- Clade: Tracheophytes
- Clade: Angiosperms
- Clade: Eudicots
- Order: Caryophyllales
- Family: Cactaceae
- Subfamily: Cactoideae
- Genus: Pilosocereus
- Species: P. eddie-estevesii

Binomial name
- Pilosocereus eddie-estevesii (P.J. Braun) Guiggi

Synonyms
- Pierrebraunia eddie-estevesii; Arrojadoa eddie-estevesii

= Pilosocereus eddie-estevesii =

Species of cactus

Pilosocereus eddie-estevesii is a species of cactus native to Northern Minas Gerais.

== Description ==
Pilosocereus eddie-estevesii is found in rocky outcrops. It is a columnar cactus, often branching at the base. The stems are a grayish-green color. The stems have 11 to 14 ribs on which the areoles develop.

The areoles are 1.5 to 3.8 mm in diameter, growing in a dense fashion. The tip of mature stems are covered in a white pseudocephalium. Flowering areoles are marked by fluffy, white wool up to 1.5 cm long. Each areole has 7 to 11 radial spines and 1 to 4 central spines. Spines are golden.

When the stems reach around 40 cm, the plant begins flowering. Pollination is carried out by hummingbirds and butterflies. The flowers are funnel-shaped and pink in color. The outer bracts of the flower are fleshy and pink, while the inner perianth segments are white with pink. The nectar chamber is more or less closed at the top, and the style is white and about 4.3 cm long.

The fruit is a spherical berry, and can reach a diameter of up to 3 cm. The pulp is pinkish-red. The seeds are black, 1.8 to 2.1 mm long.

== Taxonomy & etymology ==
Pilosocereus eddie-estevesii was first described as Pierrebraunia eddie-estevesii Pierre Josef Braun in 2017. Morphological characteristics have proven that this species actually belongs to Pilosocereus. The specific epithet "eddie-estevesii" refers to the Brazilian botanist Eddie Esteves Pereira.
