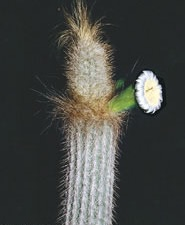

Scientific classification
- Kingdom: Plantae
- Clade: Embryophytes
- Clade: Tracheophytes
- Clade: Spermatophytes
- Clade: Angiosperms
- Clade: Eudicots
- Order: Caryophyllales
- Family: Cactaceae
- Subfamily: Cactoideae
- Tribe: Cereeae
- Genus: Stephanocereus
- Species: S. leucostele

Binomial name
- Stephanocereus leucostele.(Gürke) A.Berger

Synonyms
- Arrojadoa leucostele (Gürke) Anceschi & Magli 2021; Cephalocereus leucostele (Gürke) Britton & Rose 1920; Cereus leucostele Gürke 1908; Pilocereus leucostele (Gürke) Werderm. 1933

= Stephanocereus =

Genus of Brazilian cactus

Stephanocereus is genus of cactus from Brazil, related to Arrojadoa. This genus is monotypic with the sole species Stephanocereus leucostele.

== Description ==
It typically grows as a single, unbranched stem that can reach heights of 2 to 5 meters. The bluish-green stems, which are segmented and have a diameter of 4 to 8 cm (1.6 to 3.1 in), with 13 to 18 ribs. Ribs are triangular with rounded edges around 5 mm (0.20 in) high. The areoles are spaced 12–16 mm (0.63 in) apart and bear spines. Each areole has 1 to 6 stiff central spines, measuring 3 to 4 cm (1.2 to 1.6 in) long and ranging in color from white to golden yellow. Additionally, there are 12 to 16 radial spines, which are white and 5 to 15 mm (0.20 to 0.59 in) long. The plant produces tubular to bell-shaped flowers that are white and 6 to 7 cm (2.4 to 2.8 in) long. These flowers occasionally emerge from the ring-shaped cephalium, a densely woolly and hairy structure that forms at the end of each growth period and segments the stem. The fruits are spherical or slightly elongated, initially green and later turning blue, and 4 by 3.5 cm (1.6 by 1.4 in).

== Distribution ==
Stephanocereus leucostele is a tall, columnar cactus native to the southern part of Bahia to the north of the state of Minas Gerais, Brazil.

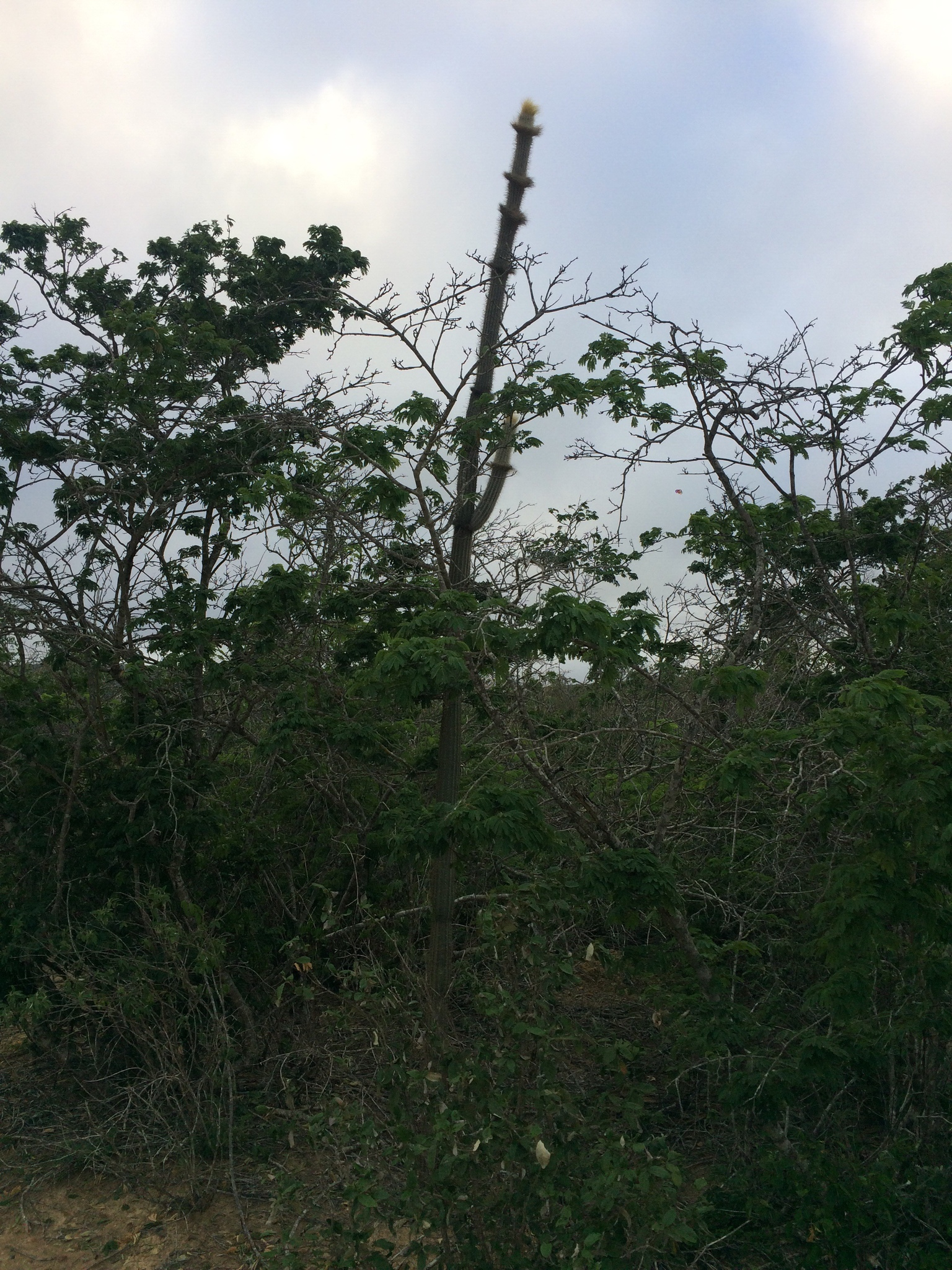
Plant growing in Laje dos Negros, Campo Formoso - State of Bahia, Brazil

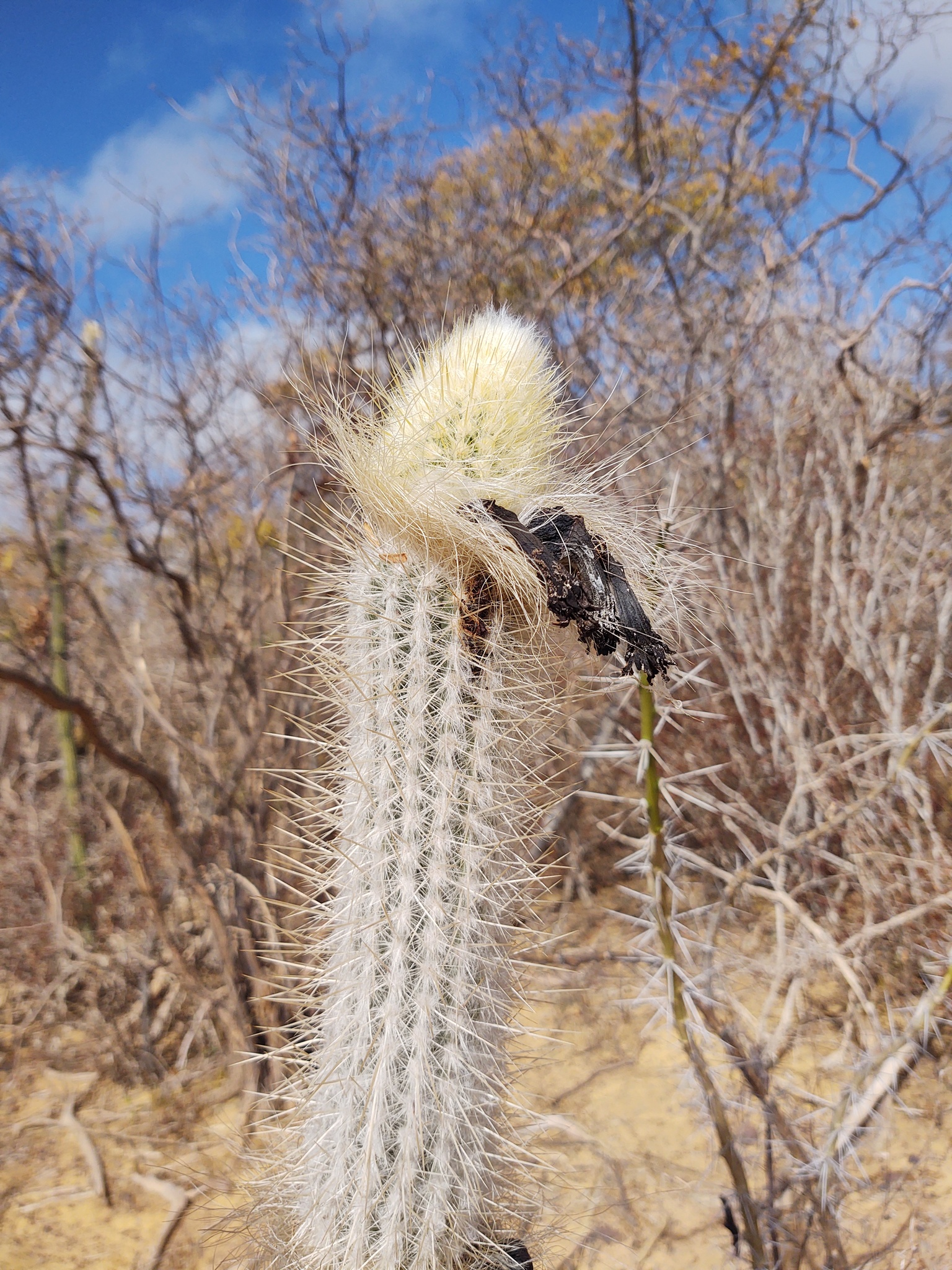
Plant growing in Cafarnaum, State of Bahia, Brazil

== Taxonomy ==
Stephanocereus leucostele was first described as Cereus leucostele by Max Gürke in 1908 and was later placed in the genus Stephanocereus by Alwin Berger in 1926. The specific epithet "leucostele" is derived from the Greek words "leukos" (white) and "stele" (column), referring to the plant's appearance.
