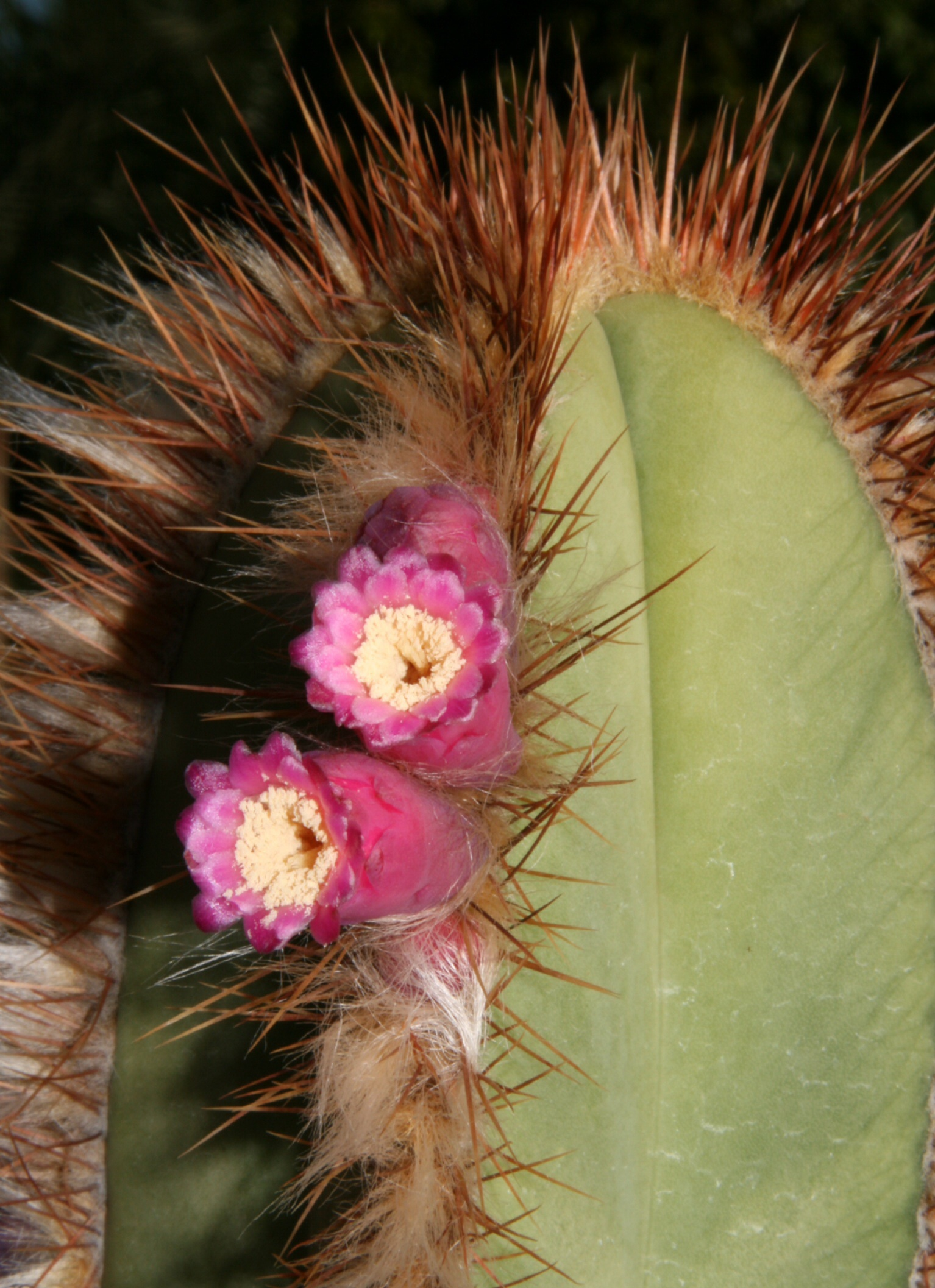

Scientific classification
- Kingdom: Plantae
- Clade: Tracheophytes
- Clade: Angiosperms
- Clade: Eudicots
- Order: Caryophyllales
- Family: Cactaceae
- Subfamily: Cactoideae
- Tribe: Cereeae
- Subtribe: Cereinae
- Genus: Pilosocereus
- Species: P. brauniorum

Binomial name
- Pilosocereus brauniorum (Esteves) N.P. Taylor & Zappi

Synonyms
- Pierrebraunia brauniorum Esteves; Pilosocereus fulvilanatus subsp. brauniorum (Esteves) Guiggi 2024

= Pilosocereus brauniorum =

Species of cactus

Pilosocereus brauniorum is a species of cactus native to Brazil first published in 1999 by Eddie Esteves Pereira

== Description ==
Pilosocereus brauniorum is a species of upright cactus that is 30 to 70 cm tall. The nearly square stems with 4-5 broad ribs form a small candelabra. The epidermis is a yellowish green at first, eventually becoming a grayish green with age. Once cut, the inside of the stem is extremely mucilaginous; The mucilage cells are up to 1 cm in depth, similar to that of Uebelmannia pectinifera. At the height of 25 cm, the plants reach maturity and begin to flower. Plants are often found growing inside rock crevices. The round areoles are 4-6 mm wide, spaced 5-11 mm, and have loose grey felt. The needle-like spines are found in clusters of 5-7. In each cluster, there are 4-6 radial spines (21 mm) and 1 central spine (29 mm). All spines are a reddish brown to dark gray.

Areoles are on the Pseudocephalium are thicker than other areoles at 6 mm. Chestnut colored hairs are present on newer floriferous areoles, whereas older ones have gray hair. Hairs are up to 6 cm long.

Flowers stay open for 2 days and 1 night, attracting hummingbirds for pollination. At full anthesis, the flowers are 3 cm long and 1.5-2.5 cm wide. The flowers are compareitively small to other members of the subtribe Cereinae. The flower shape is more or less tubular and pink in color. Fruits are globose and split open when ripe.
