= Barro Alto, Bahia =

Municipality of Bahia State, Brazil

'Barro Alto
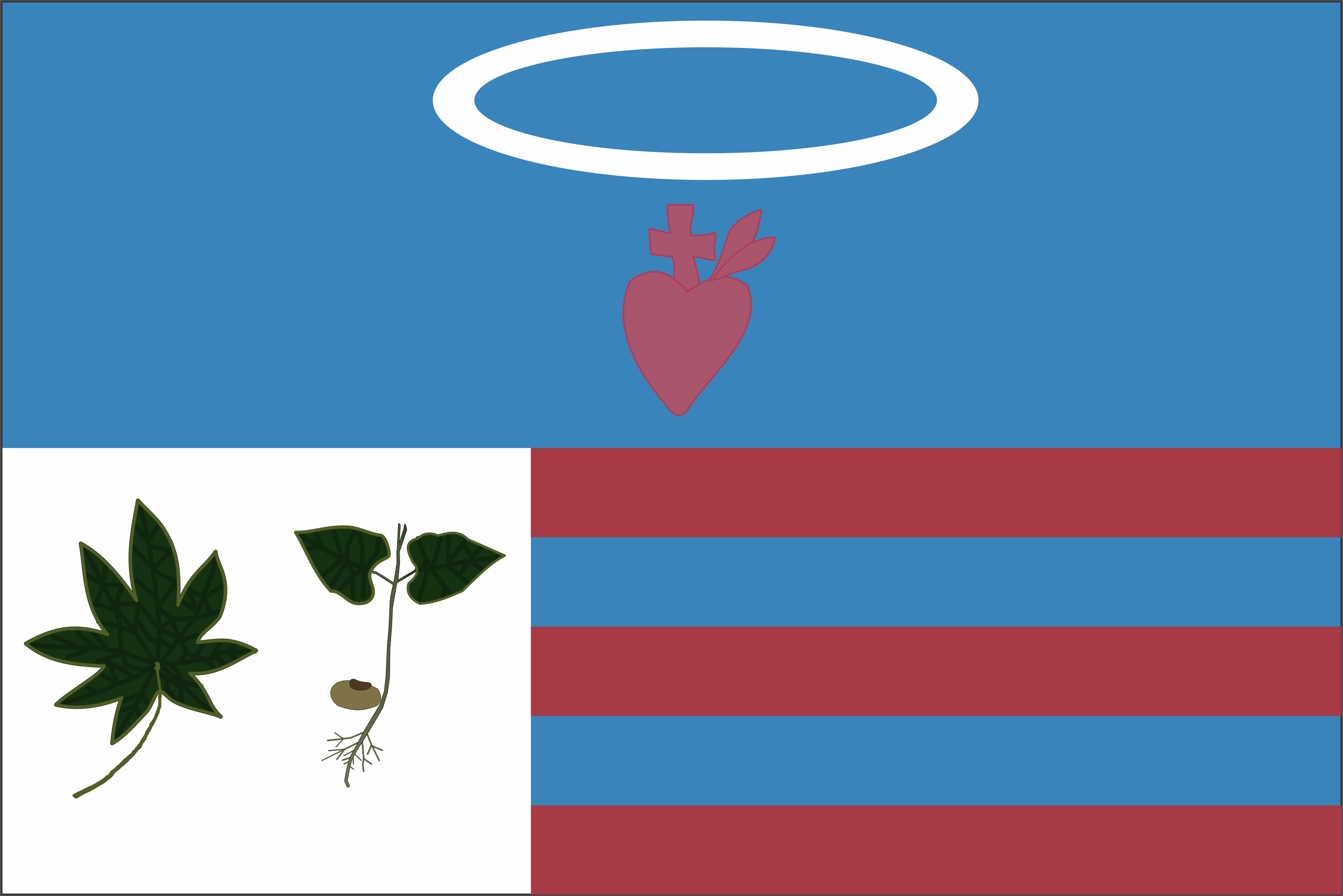
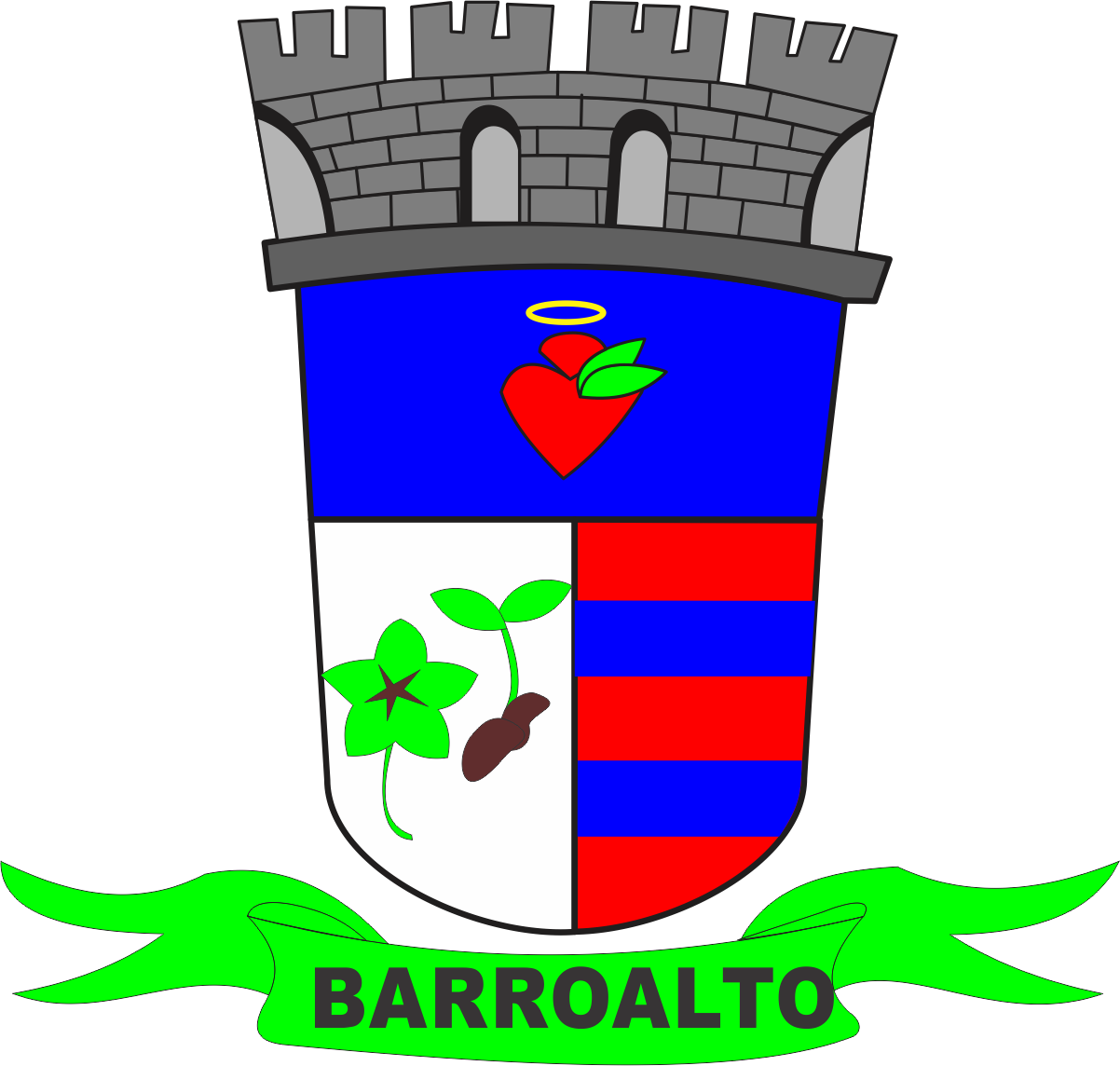
- Flag Coat of arms

- Coordinates: 11°45′39″S 41°54′53″W
- Country: Brazil
- Region: Nordeste
- State: Bahia
- Founded: 9 May 1985
- Elevation: 705 m (2,313 ft)

Population (2020)
  - Total: 15,054
- Time zone: UTC−3 (BRT)
- Postal code: 2903235

Barro Alto is a municipality in the state of Bahia in the North-East region of Brazil.

== See also ==
- List of municipalities in Bahia
