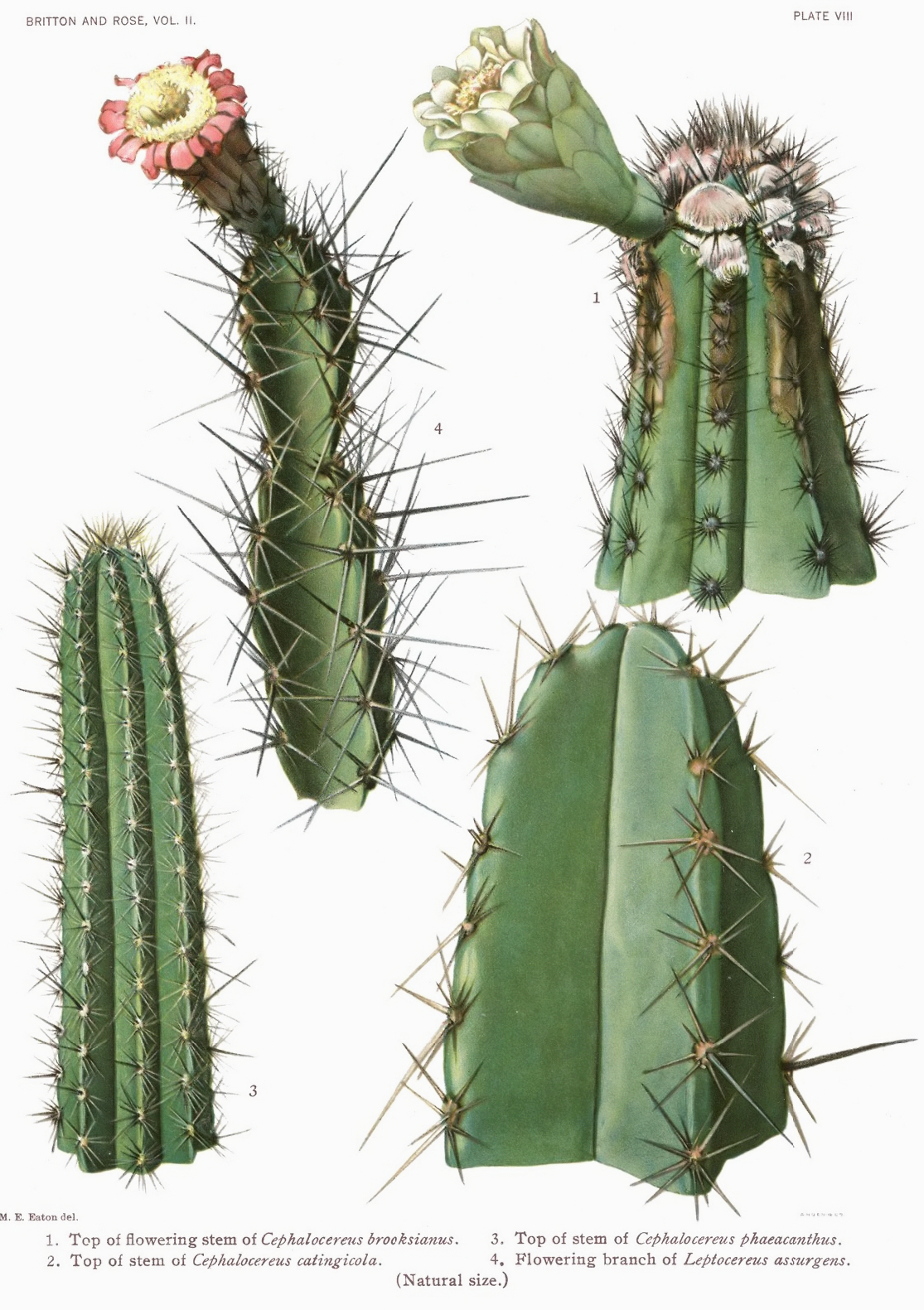
- Brasilicereus phaeacanthus (left-most image)

Scientific classification
- Kingdom: Plantae
- Clade: Tracheophytes
- Clade: Angiosperms
- Clade: Eudicots
- Order: Caryophyllales
- Family: Cactaceae
- Subfamily: Cactoideae
- Tribe: Cereeae
- Subtribe: Cereinae
- Genus: Brasilicereus; Backeb.

Species
- See text.

= Brasilicereus =

Genus of cacti

Brasilicereus is a genus of cacti known only from east Brazil and comprising two species.

== Description ==
The species of the genus Brasilicereus grow as shrubs with upright, sometimes crooked, rarely branching shoots that reach heights of 1 to 4 meters. The slender shoots can be up to 2.5 centimeters in diameter. They have 3 to 5 flat or narrow ribs. The needle-like, brittle spines are whitish to grayish-brown and arise from areoles covered with gray or white wool. There are 1 to 4 central spines up to 4 centimeters long and 10 to 18 marginal spines 0.5 to 1.5 centimeters long. The flowers, which are short-tubed to bell-shaped, open at night. The flower cup and tube are covered with fleshy scales, and the areoles are glabrous. The dull green to purple fruits are spherical to pear-shaped, with a persistent flower remnant, and do not tear.

== Species ==
As of October 2025, Plants of the World Online accepted the following species:

Image	Scientific name	Distribution
	Brasilicereus markgrafii	Brazil.
	Brasilicereus phaeacanthus	Bahia, Brasil
