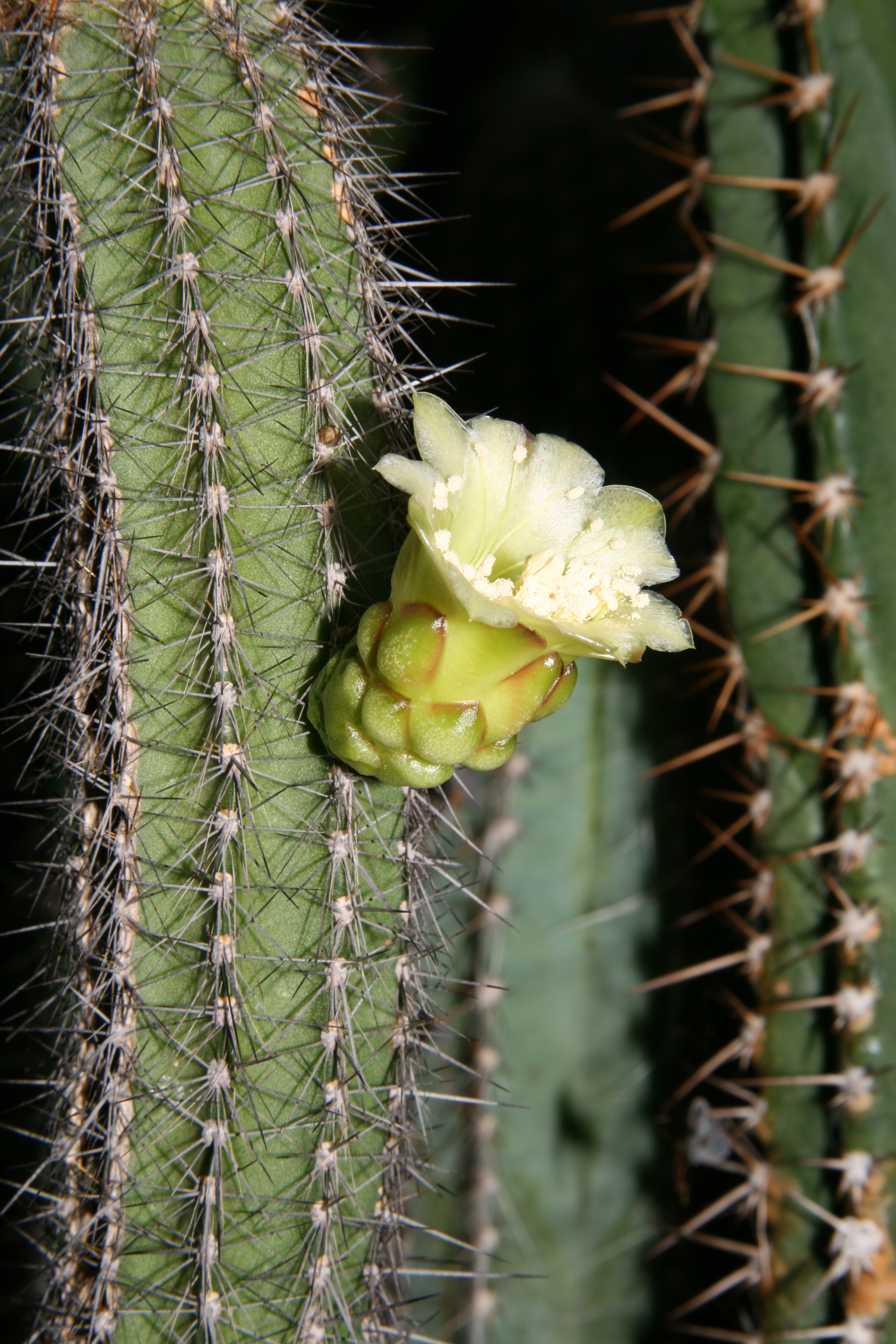

Conservation status
- Endangered (IUCN 3.1)

Scientific classification
- Kingdom: Plantae
- Clade: Embryophytes
- Clade: Tracheophytes
- Clade: Spermatophytes
- Clade: Angiosperms
- Clade: Eudicots
- Order: Caryophyllales
- Family: Cactaceae
- Subfamily: Cactoideae
- Genus: Facheiroa
- Species: F. phaeacantha

Binomial name
- Facheiroa phaeacantha (Gürke) N.P.Taylor

Synonyms
- Brasilicereus phaeacanthus (Gürke) Backeberg; Cephalocereus phaeacanthus (Gürke) Britton & Rose 1920; Cereus phaeacanthus Gürke 1908; Pilocereus phaeacanthus (Gürke) Backeb. 1936; Brasilicereus breviflorus F.Ritter 1979; Brasilicereus phaeacanthus subsp. breviflorus (F.Ritter) P.J.Braun & Esteves 1995; Cereus phaeacanthus var. breviflorus (F.Ritter) P.J.Braun 1988; Pilocereus verheinei Rümpler 1885

= Facheiroa phaeacantha =

Species of cacti

Facheiroa phaeacantha is a species of Facheiroa found in Brazil.

== Description ==
Facheiroa phaeacantha typically grows with shoots that branch from the base, standing upright but sometimes leaning or climbing. The shoots are 4 to 9 centimeters in diameter and can reach up to 4 meters in height. The plant has 8 to 13 low, narrow ribs covered with whitish wool in the areoles. It features 1 to 3 yellowish-brown central spines up to 3 centimeters long and 10 to 12 yellowish marginal spines between 10 and 15 millimeters long. The flowers are whitish green to greenish, up to 6.5 centimeters long, and 6 centimeters in diameter, with a slightly curved flower tube. The slightly bumpy fruits can reach a diameter of up to 1.5 centimeters.

== Distribution ==
Facheiroa phaeacantha is native to the Brazilian state of Bahia.

== Taxonomy ==
It was first described as Cereus phaeacanthus by Max Gürke in 1908. The specific epithet phaeacanthus derives from the Greek words phaios (gray) and akanthos (thorn), referring to the plant's thorniness. Curt Backeberg reclassified it into the genus Brasilicereus in 1942. Then, it was reclassified to Facheiroa.
