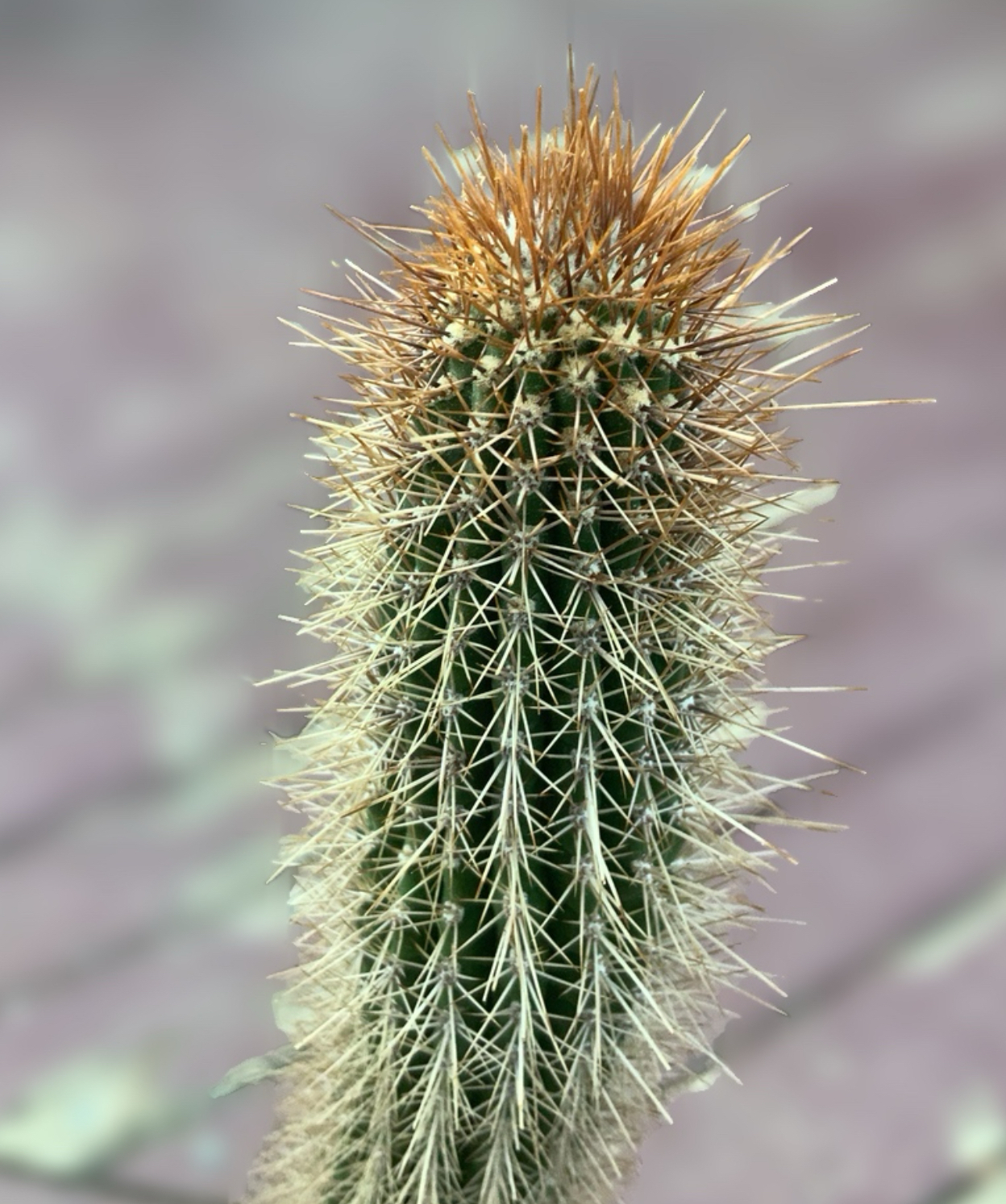

Conservation status
- Least Concern (IUCN 3.1)

Scientific classification
- Kingdom: Plantae
- Clade: Tracheophytes
- Clade: Angiosperms
- Clade: Eudicots
- Order: Caryophyllales
- Family: Cactaceae
- Subfamily: Cactoideae
- Genus: Facheiroa
- Species: F. squamosa

Binomial name
- Facheiroa squamosa (Gürke) P.J. Braun & Esteves 1989

= Facheiroa squamosa =

Species of cactus

Facheiroa squamosa is a species of succulent flowering plant in the family Cactaceae. It is native to northeastern Brazil.

== Etymology ==
The specific epithet squamosa comes from the Latin words squāma (meaning "scale") and the suffix -ōsus (meaning "full of"), referring to the scales on the ovary.

== Description ==
Facheiroa squamosa is an erect species of cactus, with 18-19 obtuse ribs, 8 radial spines, and 1 central spine almost twice as long as the radial spines. Stems are several meters high, 2.5 to 4 cm in diameter, and have 18 to 19 sharp ribs. Areoles are 6 to 8 mm apart, almost circular, 2 to 8 mm in diameter, and are covered in woolly felt. Radial spines are 8 in number, are 5 to 12 mm long, not very sharp, and light brown. The central spine (2 cm) points upwards, having similar characteristics to the radial spines. As the plant ages, the spines gradually fall off or become heavily worn. The white flowers are tubular, 35 to 40 mm long, and 16 to 20 mm in diameter. This species was formerly placed into its own genus, Zehntnerella.

== Habitat and Ecology ==
Facheiroa squamosa is endemic to northeastern Brazil, at elevations of 370 to 1000 meters above sea level, where it can be found growing on limestone cliffs.

Facheiroa squamosa grows together with Melocactus, Pilosocereus, Tacinga, and Quiabentia.

== Taxonomy ==
Facheiroa squamosa has two subspecies:

Image	Scientific name	Distribution
	Facheiroa squamosa subsp. chaetacantha (F.Ritter) N.P.Taylor & Zappi	
	Facheiroa squamosa subsp. squamosa	
