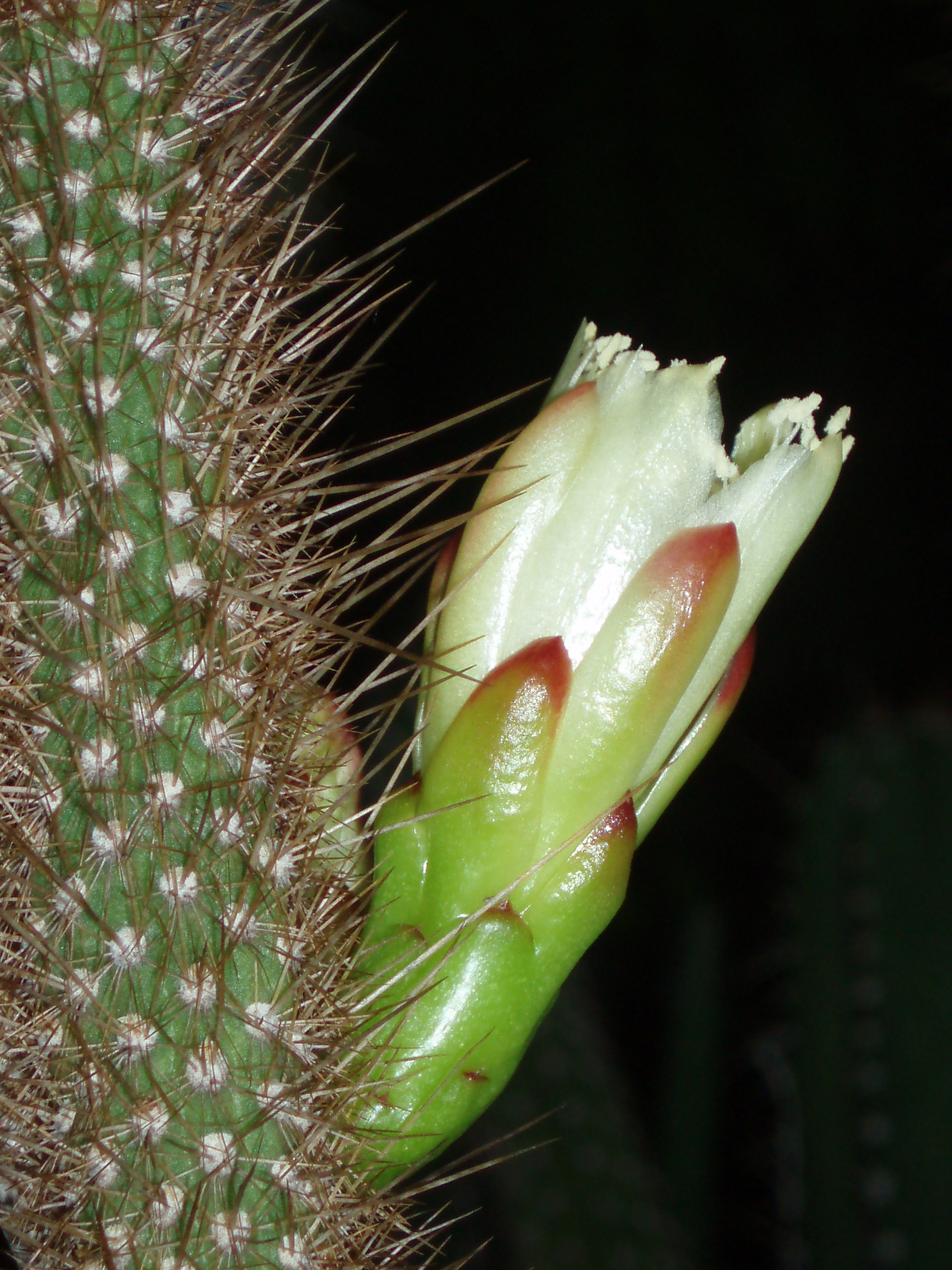

Conservation status
- Vulnerable (IUCN 3.1)

Scientific classification
- Kingdom: Plantae
- Clade: Tracheophytes
- Clade: Angiosperms
- Clade: Eudicots
- Order: Caryophyllales
- Family: Cactaceae
- Subfamily: Cactoideae
- Genus: Facheiroa
- Species: F. markgrafii

Binomial name
- Facheiroa markgrafii Backeb. & Voll

Synonyms
- Cereus markgrafii (Backeb. & Voll) P.J.Braun 1988; Brasilicereus markgrafii Backeberg & Voll

= Facheiroa markgrafii =

Species of cactus

Facheiroa markgrafii is a species of cactus which is endemic to Brazil.

== Description ==
Facheiroa markgrafii has unbranched, grayish-green shoots that are up to 2.5 cm in diameter and can grow up to 1.5 meters tall. It typically has 13 ribs with gray wool-covered areoles. The cactus has one central spine, occasionally up to four, reaching up to 4 cm long, and 12 to 18 irregularly protruding marginal spines, each 6 to 10 mm long. The flowers are bell- to funnel-shaped, light green-whitish, up to 6 cm long, and 5 cm in diameter.

== Distribution ==
This species is found in Minas Gerais, Brazil. It occurs in the campos rupestres (rocky fields) montane savanna.

== Taxonomy ==
It was first described in 1949 by Curt Backeberg and Otto Voll. The specific epithet, markgrafii, honors German botanist Friedrich Markgraf.
