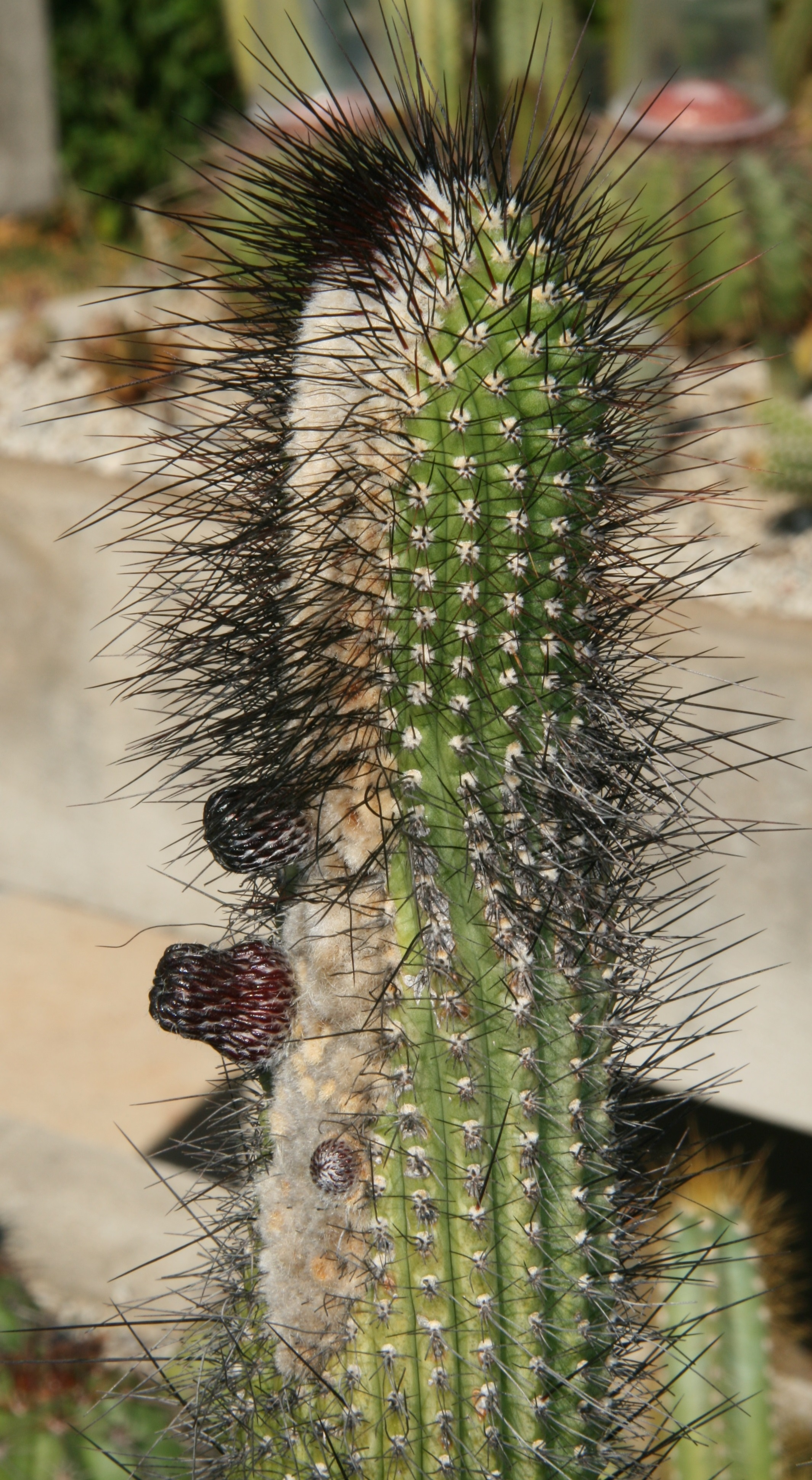

Conservation status
- Vulnerable (IUCN 3.1)

Scientific classification
- Kingdom: Plantae
- Clade: Tracheophytes
- Clade: Angiosperms
- Clade: Eudicots
- Order: Caryophyllales
- Family: Cactaceae
- Subfamily: Cactoideae
- Genus: Facheiroa
- Species: F. cephaliomelana

Binomial name
- Facheiroa cephaliomelana Buining & Brederoo

= Facheiroa cephaliomelana =

Species of cactus

Facheiroa cephaliomelana is a species of plant in the family Cactaceae.

== Description ==
Facheiroa cephaliomelana is a branching cactus that grows from the base, featuring columnar green to dark gray-green shoots that can reach heights of 1.5 to 3.8 meters. These shoots have a diameter of 4 to 7 centimeters and display 22 to 27 rounded ribs. The areoles are oval-shaped, covered in yellowish-white wool and hair, and bear fine, straight spines that are yellowish with a brown tip. There are 1 to 3 central spines, each up to 4 centimeters long, and 9 to 13 marginal spines that are 0.8 to 2.8 centimeters long. The cephalium, which is 0.75 to 1 meter long and 3 centimeters wide, consists of up to 9 ribs and is adorned with yellow to yellowish-brown hairs measuring up to 8 millimeters long.

The cactus produces whitish-pink to pink flowers that can grow up to 3.5 centimeters long with a diameter of 2.8 centimeters. Its fruits are brownish, hairy, and range in color from purple to dark pink to brownish, reaching lengths of up to 1.5 centimeters and diameters of 2.5 centimeters.

=== Subspecies ===
Image	Name	Distribution
	Facheiroa cephaliomelana subsp. cephaliomelana	Brazil (Southwestern Bahia, Northern Minas Gerais)
	Facheiroa cephaliomelana subsp. estevesii (P.J.Braun) N.P.Taylor & Zappi	Brazil (Bahia)

== Distribution ==
It is endemic to Brazil. in south-central and south-western Bahia and central-northern Minas Gerais states.

This species is found at 550 –750 m in elevation. Its natural habitat is rocky areas.

It is an IUCN Red List Vulnerable species, threatened by habitat loss.

== Taxonomy ==
The species was first described in 1975 by Albert Frederik Hendrik Buining and Arnold J. Brederoo. Its name, cephaliomelana, comes from the Greek words kephale meaning 'head' and melas meaning 'black,' referring to the dark hairs on its head.
