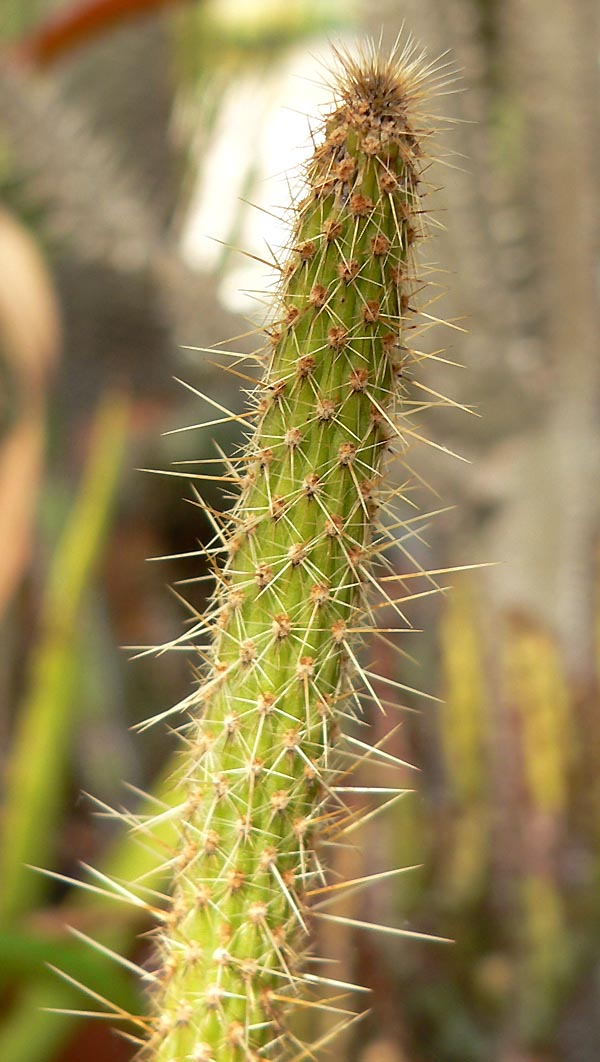

Conservation status
- Least Concern (IUCN 3.1)

Scientific classification
- Kingdom: Plantae
- Clade: Tracheophytes
- Clade: Angiosperms
- Clade: Eudicots
- Order: Caryophyllales
- Family: Cactaceae
- Subfamily: Cactoideae
- Genus: Facheiroa
- Species: F. bahiensis

Binomial name
- Facheiroa bahiensis (Britton & Rose) N.P.Taylor

Synonyms
- Cereus bahiensis (Britton & Rose) Luetzelb.; Facheiroa eddie-estevesii Lodé; Leocereus bahiensis Britton & Rose; Leocereus bahiensis subsp. barreirensis (P.J.Braun & Esteves) P.J.Braun & Esteves; Leocereus bahiensis subsp. exiguospinus (P.J.Braun & Esteves) P.J.Braun & Esteves; Leocereus bahiensis subsp. robustispinus (P.J.Braun & Esteves) P.J.Braun & Esteves; Leocereus bahiensis subsp. urandianus (F.Ritter) P.J.Braun & Esteves; Leocereus estevesii P.J.Braun; Leocereus urandianus F.Ritter

= Facheiroa bahiensis =

Genus of cacti

Facheiroa bahiensis is a species of flowering plant in the family Cactaceae, endemic to Brazil. It was first described by Britton and Rose in 1920 as Leocereus bahiensis.

== Description ==
Facheiroa bahiensis has stems that are long, thin and almost terete. A full adult plant can grow up to 2 meters in length and about 1.5 cm in diameter. They tend to grow like vines. They do not have wool or hairs, but they do have needle-like spines (about 4 cm long, yellowish-brown in color) and felt. In Bahia, it is called the "tail of the fox" due to its long, thin bristle-like composition. The flower is white and narrow and within it are hair-like bristle spines. The areoles are circular and closely spaced. Facherioa bahiensis produces fruit 10 to 12 mm with seeds about 1.5 mm long.

== Distribution ==
The cactus is endemic to Brazil. It is found growing in the campos rupestres (rocky fields) montane savanna ecoregion of the Atlantic Forest biome.

It grows in rocky shady places such as amongst shrubs, or near cliffs and rocks.

== Conservation ==
Facheiroa bahiensis is being affected by habitat loss, though it has a wide range. The eastern range of the plant is generally regarded as ending up in an area that is not ideal for agricultural growth. The major threat to habitat loss that happens within numerous national parks (Parque Nacional da Chapada Diamantina, Parque Estadual de Morro Chapeu, Parque Nacional Boqueirão da Onça and Parque Nacional do Rio Parnaiba) is due to industrialization. The western area of its range is most affected by industrial-scale agriculture of soy, Eucalyptus and cotton.

== Uses ==
Caffeine is said to occur in the stems of this plant, but it is unconfirmed. Also this plant potentially contains Mescaline.

== Classification ==
Genetic sequencing published in 2023 reclassified Leocereus bahiensis as F. bahiensis. As of April 2026, Plants of the World Online still lists this species as L. bahiensis.
