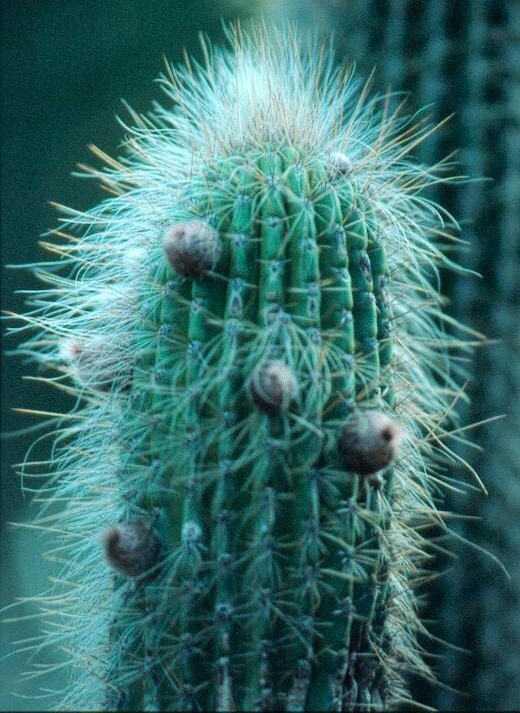

Scientific classification
- Kingdom: Plantae
- Clade: Tracheophytes
- Clade: Angiosperms
- Clade: Eudicots
- Order: Caryophyllales
- Family: Cactaceae
- Subfamily: Cactoideae
- Genus: Facheiroa
- Species: F. braunii

Binomial name
- Facheiroa braunii Esteves

= Facheiroa braunii =

Species of cactus

Facheiroa braunii is a species of succulent flowering plant in the genus Facheiroa, within the family Cactaceae. It is endemic to the state of Bahia in northeastern Brazil.

== Description ==
Facheiroa braunii is a species of treelike cactus which has a candelabra-like growth form. It grows to a height of up to 5 meters, and its stems can reach approximately 7 cm in diameter. Its robust, branched structure allows it to stand out from the surrounding vegetation.

This species has 20 or more well-defined ribs. On the ribs are the areoles, each of which has approximately 25 spines, but no trichomes or bristles.

The flowers are red-brown in color, and are distinguished by the presence of numerous trichomes at the bases of the first filaments of the stamens.

== Distribution and habitat ==
This species is native to the state of Bahia in northeastern Brazil.

It is primarily found in the seasonally-dry tropical biome. It grows on rocky substrates at altitudes of 1100 to 1250 meters above sea level.

== Taxonomy ==
Facheiroa braunii was described by the Brazilian botanist Eddie Esteves Pereira and published for the first time in the scientific journal Cactus and Succulent Journal 76: 126 in 2004.

Etymology

- Facheiroa: the genus name is derived from the Portuguese word facheiro, which is the local common name in Brazil for cacti of this genus.
- braunii: the specific epithet honors the German agronomist and botanist Pierre Josef Braun, a frequent associate of Eddie Esteves Pereira.

== Cultivation ==
Facheiroa braunii is cultivated primarily as an ornamental. It may be cultivated via seed or cuttings, although it is rare in cultivation.
