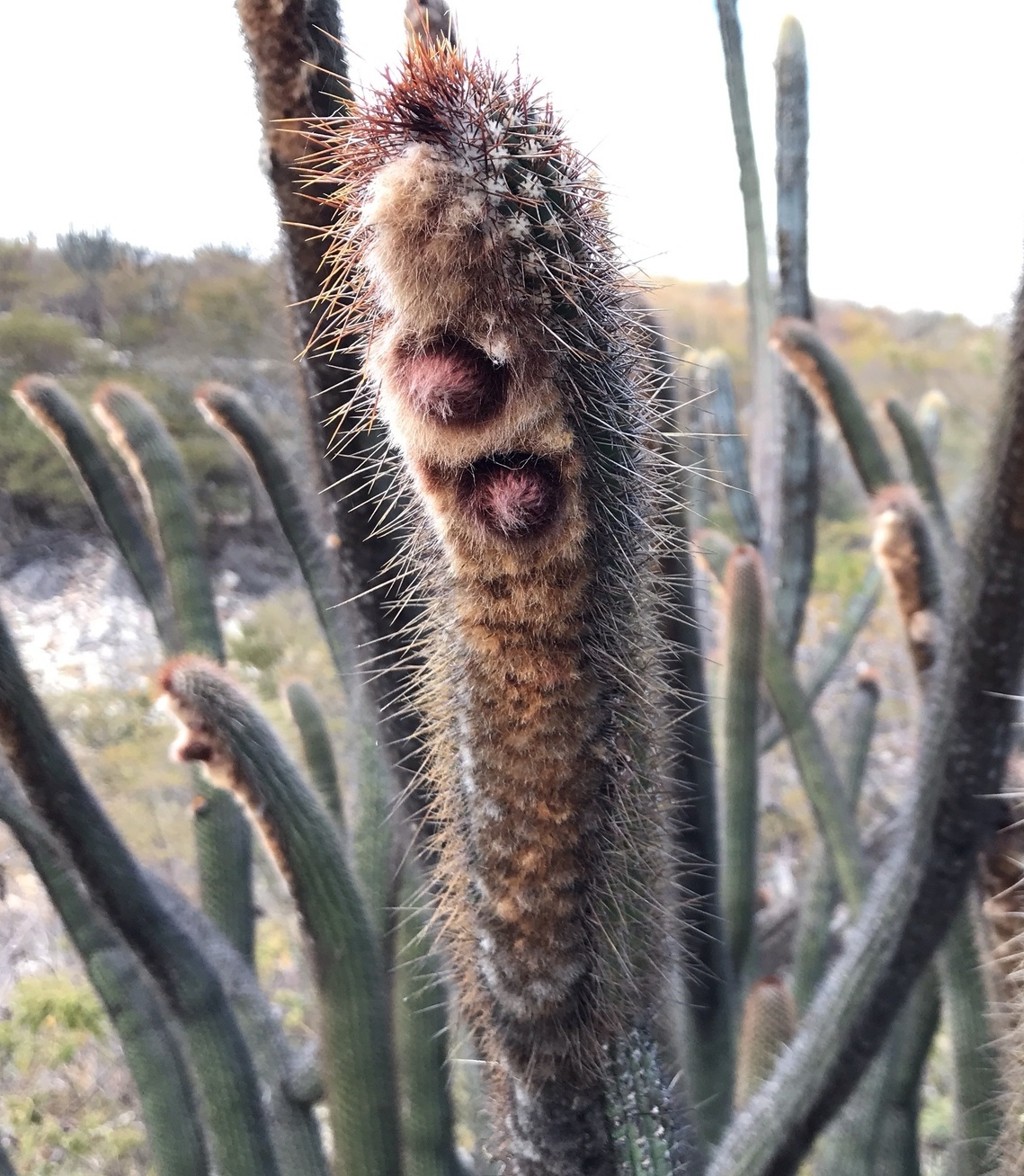

Conservation status
- Least Concern (IUCN 3.1)

Scientific classification
- Kingdom: Plantae
- Clade: Embryophytes
- Clade: Tracheophytes
- Clade: Spermatophytes
- Clade: Angiosperms
- Clade: Eudicots
- Order: Caryophyllales
- Family: Cactaceae
- Subfamily: Cactoideae
- Genus: Facheiroa
- Species: F. ulei

Binomial name
- Facheiroa ulei (Gürke) Werderm.

Synonyms
- Cephalocereus ulei Gürke (1908); Cereus pubiflorus (Britton & Rose) Vaupel; Cereus ulei (Gürke) Luetzelb.; Espostoa ulei (Gürke) Buxb.; Facheiroa pubiflora Britton & Rose

= Facheiroa ulei =

Species of cactus

Facheiroa ulei is a species of flowering plant in the family Cactaceae.

It is a succulent shrub or tree endemic to Brazil, and occurs in northern Bahia east of the San Francisco River, at elevations of 400 to 950 m.

Its natural habitats are rocky areas and hot tropic desert scrub.
