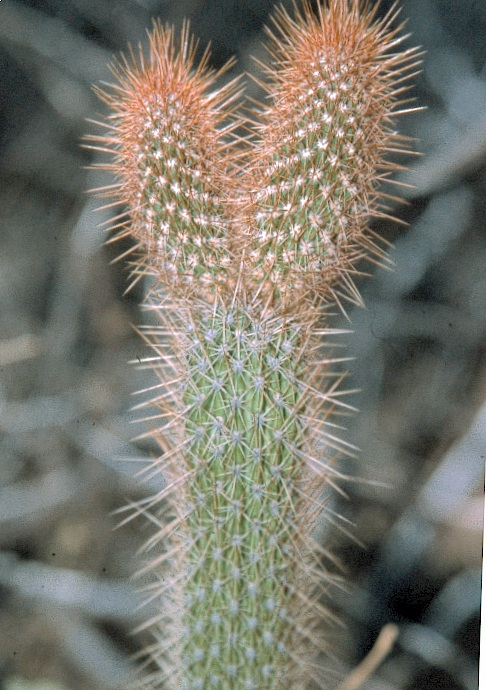
- Facheiroa squamosa

Scientific classification
- Kingdom: Plantae
- Clade: Tracheophytes
- Clade: Angiosperms
- Clade: Eudicots
- Order: Caryophyllales
- Family: Cactaceae
- Subfamily: Cactoideae
- Tribe: Cereeae
- Subtribe: Cereinae
- Genus: Facheiroa; Britton & Rose

Species
- See text

Synonyms
- Zehntnerella Britton & Rose

= Facheiroa =

Genus of cacti

Facheiroa is a genus of cacti that is endemic to Brazil.

== Description ==
The species of the genus Facheiroa grow shrubby or tree-like, are heavily branched, have a short trunk and reach heights of growth of up to 5 meters. The shoots are ascending, cylindrical and have 12 to 25 (rarely more) narrow ribs with variable spines. The bristly cephalium is sunken or superficial.

The tubular flowers are covered with imbricated scales and open at night. Your flower cup and the flower tube are richly covered with hair. The fleshy, spherical, semi-transparent, non-tearing fruits are green to brown or purple. They contain a juicy pulp. The small to medium-sized seeds are ovate, semi-matt, and brown to black-brown.

== Species ==
As of May 2025, Plants of the World Online accepted the following species:

Image	Scientific name	Distribution
	Facheiroa braunii Esteves	Brazil
	Facheiroa cephaliomelana Buining & Brederoo	Brazil
	Facheiroa squamosa	Brazil
	Facheiroa ulei	Brazil

=== Other species ===
Genetic sequencing published in 2023 reclassified Leocereus bahiensis as F. bahiensis. As of April 2026, Plants of the World Online still lists this species as L. bahiensis.

Species of genus Zehntnerella have been reclassified into this genus.
