= List of Syzygium species =

Syzygium is a large, broadly distributed genus of flowering plants in the myrtle family Myrtaceae. The following is an alphabetical list of all 1246 species and one hybrid in the genus that are accepted by Plants of the World Online as of October 2025

== A ==
- Syzygium abatakum Widodo
- Syzygium abbreviatum Merr.
- Syzygium aborense (Dunn) Rathakr. & N.C.Nair
- Syzygium abortivum (Gagnep.) Merr. & L.M.Perry
- Syzygium abulugense Merr.
- Syzygium aciculinum Merr. & L.M.Perry
- Syzygium acre (Pancher ex Guillaumin) J.W.Dawson
- Syzygium acrophilum (C.B.Rob.) Merr.
- Syzygium acuminatissimum (Blume) DC.
- Syzygium acuminatum (Sweet) Miq.
- Syzygium acutangulum Nied.
- Syzygium acutatum (Miq.) Amshoff
- Syzygium adelphicum Diels
- Syzygium adenophyllum Merr. & L.M.Perry
- Syzygium aegiceroides (Korth. ex Miq.) Korth.
- Syzygium aemulum (Blume) Amshoff
- Syzygium aeoranthum (Diels) Merr. & L.M.Perry
- Syzygium affine Merr.
- Syzygium afromontanum (F.White) Byng
- Syzygium agastyamalayanum M.B.Viswan. & Manik.
- Syzygium aggregatum J.W.Dawson
- Syzygium aksorniae Chantar. & J.Parn.
- Syzygium alatoramulum B.Hyland
- Syzygium alatum (Lauterb.) Diels
- Syzygium albayense Merr.
- Syzygium albiflorum (Duthie ex Kurz) Bahadur & R.C.Gaur
- Syzygium album Q.F.Zheng
- Syzygium alliiligneum B.Hyland
- Syzygium altecastaneum (P.S.Ashton) Byng & Christenh.
- Syzygium alternifolium (Wight) Walp.
- Syzygium alubo Kosterm.
- Syzygium alutaceum (Diels) Merr. & L.M.Perry
- Syzygium alvarezii (C.B.Rob.) Merr.
- Syzygium alyxiifolium (Ridl.) I.M.Turner
- Syzygium amicorum (A.Gray) Müll.Berol.
- Syzygium amieuense (Guillaumin) J.W.Dawson
- Syzygium amphoraecarpus Kosterm.
- Syzygium amplexicaule (Lindl.) N.P.Balakr.
- Syzygium ampliflorum (Koord. & Valeton) Amshoff
- Syzygium amplifolium L.M.Perry
- Syzygium amplum T.G.Hartley & L.M.Perry
- Syzygium ampullarium (Stapf) Merr. & L.M.Perry
- Syzygium anacardiifolium (Craib) Chantar. & J.Parn.
- Syzygium anamalaianum Ramas. & Surendr.
- Syzygium andamanicum (King) N.P.Balakr.
- Syzygium aneityense Guillaumin
- Syzygium angkae (Craib) Chantar. & J.Parn.
- Syzygium angophoroides (F.Muell.) B.Hyland
- Syzygium angulare (Elmer) Merr.
- Syzygium angulatum (C.B.Rob.) Merr.
- Syzygium angustifolium (M.R.Hend.) Byng & Christenh.
- Syzygium angustovatum Widodo & Chikmaw.
- Syzygium anisatum (Vickery) Craven & Biffin
- Syzygium anisopetalum (R.Parker) N.P.Balakr.
- Syzygium anisosepalum (Duthie) I.M.Turner
- Syzygium anomalum Lauterb.
- Syzygium anthicoides P.S.Ashton
- Syzygium anthicum (Ridl.) Merr. & L.M.Perry
- Syzygium antisepticum (Blume) Merr. & L.M.Perry
- Syzygium antonianum (Elmer) Merr.
- Syzygium aoupinianum J.W.Dawson
- Syzygium apetiolatum J.W.Dawson
- Syzygium apiarii P.S.Ashton
- Syzygium apodophyllum (F.Muell.) B.Hyland
- Syzygium apodum Miq.
- Syzygium apoense (Elmer) Merr.
- Syzygium aporematum Craven & Damas
- Syzygium aqueum (Burm.f.) Alston
- Syzygium araiocladum Merr. & L.M.Perry
- Syzygium araucariarum Craven & Damas
- Syzygium arboreum (Baker f.) J.W.Dawson
- Syzygium arcanum P.S.Ashton
- Syzygium arcuatinervium (Merr.) Craven & Biffin
- Syzygium arenitense Craven
- Syzygium argyrocalyx (Warb.) Merr. & L.M.Perry
- Syzygium argyropedicum B.Hyland
- Syzygium armstrongii (Benth.) B.Hyland
- Syzygium aromaticum (L.) Merr. & L.M.Perry
- Syzygium assamicum (Biswas & Purkay.) Raizada
- Syzygium assimile Thwaites
- Syzygium astronioides (C.B.Rob.) Merr.
- Syzygium attenuatum (Miq.) Merr. & L.M.Perry
- Syzygium attopeuense (Gagnep.) Merr. & L.M.Perry
- Syzygium aurantiacum (H.Perrier) Labat & Schatz
- Syzygium aureum Jayasinghe
- Syzygium auriculatum Brongn. & Gris
- Syzygium australe (J.C.Wendl. ex Link) B.Hyland
- Syzygium austrocaledonicum (Seem.) Guillaumin
- Syzygium austrosinense (Merr. & L.M.Perry) H.T.Chang & R.H.Miao
- Syzygium austroyunnanense H.T.Chang & R.H.Miao
- Syzygium avene Miq.

== B ==
- Syzygium badescens P.S.Ashton
- Syzygium badium Merr. & L.M.Perry
- Syzygium baeuerlenii (F.Muell.) Craven & Biffin
- Syzygium bakoense P.S.Ashton
- Syzygium baladense (Brongn. & Gris) J.W.Dawson
- Syzygium balansae (Guillaumin) J.W.Dawson
- Syzygium balerense (C.B.Rob.) Merr.
- Syzygium balfourii (Baker) J.Guého & A.J.Scott
- Syzygium balgooyi Brambach, Byng & Culmsee
- Syzygium balsameum (Wight) Wall. ex Walp.
- Syzygium bamagense B.Hyland
- Syzygium bankense (Hassk.) Merr. & L.M.Perry
- Syzygium banksii (Britten & S.Moore) B.Hyland
- Syzygium bantamense (Koord. & Valeton) Sunarti
- Syzygium baramense (Merr.) Merr. & L.M.Perry
- Syzygium barnesii (Merr.) Merr.
- Syzygium barotsense (F.White) Byng & Christenh.
- Syzygium barringtonioides (Ridl.) Masam.
- Syzygium bartonii (F.M.Bailey) Merr. & L.M.Perry
- Syzygium bataanense (Merr.) Merr.
- Syzygium batadamba Kosterm.
- Syzygium baudouinii (Brongn. & Gris) N.Snow, Byng & J.W.Dawson
- Syzygium beccarii (Ridl.) Merr. & L.M.Perry
- Syzygium beddomei (Duthie) Chithra
- Syzygium bengkulense Widodo
- Syzygium benguellense (Welw. ex Hiern) Engl.
- Syzygium benguetense (C.B.Rob.) Merr.
- Syzygium benjaminum Diels
- Syzygium benthamianum (Duthie) Gamble
- Syzygium bernardoi (Merr.) Merr.
- Syzygium bernieri (Baill. ex Drake) Labat & Schatz
- Syzygium bharathii Ramas.
- Syzygium bicolor Merr. & L.M.Perry
- Syzygium bicostatum P.S.Ashton
- Syzygium bijouxii J.Guého & A.J.Scott
- Syzygium biniflorum (Ridl.) P.S.Ashton
- Syzygium bisulcum (Miq.) Widodo
- Syzygium blancoi (Merr.) Merr.
- Syzygium bleeseri (O.Schwarz) Byng & Christenh.
- Syzygium blumei (Steud.) Merr. & L.M.Perry
- Syzygium boerlagei (Merr.) Govaerts
- Syzygium boisianum (Gagnep.) Merr. & L.M.Perry
- Syzygium bokorense W.K.Soh & J.Parn.
- Syzygium boonjee B.Hyland
- Syzygium borbonicum J.Guého & A.J.Scott
- Syzygium bordenii (Merr.) Merr.
- Syzygium borneense (Miq.) Miq.
- Syzygium boulindaense J.W.Dawson
- Syzygium bourdillonii (Gamble) Rathakr. & N.C.Nair
- Syzygium bowersiae Craven & Damas
- Syzygium brachyanthelium Diels
- Syzygium brachybotryum Miq.
- Syzygium brachycalyx (Baker f.) J.W.Dawson
- Syzygium brachypodum Merr. & L.M.Perry
- Syzygium brachyrachis Merr. & L.M.Perry
- Syzygium brachythyrsum Merr. & L.M.Perry
- Syzygium brachyurum Merr.
- Syzygium brackenridgei (A.Gray) Müll.Berol.
- Syzygium bracteosum Merr. & L.M.Perry
- Syzygium branderhorstii Lauterb.
- Syzygium brassii Merr. & L.M.Perry
- Syzygium brazzavillense Aubrév. & Pellegr.
- Syzygium brevicymum (Diels) Merr. & L.M.Perry
- Syzygium brevifolium (A.Gray) Müll.Berol.
- Syzygium brevioperculatum J.W.Dawson
- Syzygium brevipaniculatum (Merr.) Merr.
- Syzygium brevipes (Brongn. & Gris) J.W.Dawson
- Syzygium brittonianum (C.B.Rob.) Merr.
- Syzygium brongniartii (Merr. & L.M.Perry) J.W.Dawson
- Syzygium bruynii (Diels) Merr. & L.M.Perry
- Syzygium bubengense C.Chen
- Syzygium bubuuense Craven
- Syzygium buettnerianum (K.Schum.) Nied.
- Syzygium bujangii P.S.Ashton
- Syzygium bullatum (Brongn. & Gris) N.Snow & Byng
- Syzygium bullockii (Hance) Merr. & L.M.Perry
- Syzygium bungadinnia (F.M.Bailey) B.Hyland
- Syzygium burepense T.G.Hartley & L.M.Perry
- Syzygium burkillianum (King) I.M.Turner
- Syzygium busuense T.G.Hartley & L.M.Perry
- Syzygium buxifolioideum H.T.Chang & R.H.Miao
- Syzygium buxifolium Hook. & Arn.

== C ==
- Syzygium cacuminis (Craib) Chantar. & J.Parn.
- Syzygium cadetii Byng & Christenh.
- Syzygium cagayanense (Merr.) Merr.
- Syzygium calcicola (Merr.) Merr.
- Syzygium calleryanum (C.B.Rob.) Merr.
- Syzygium callianthum Merr. & L.M.Perry
- Syzygium calophyllifolium (Wight) Walp.
- Syzygium calubcob (C.B.Rob.) Merr.
- Syzygium calyptrocalyx P.S.Ashton
- Syzygium cameronum I.M.Turner
- Syzygium camptodromum Merr. & L.M.Perry
- Syzygium camptophyllum (M.R.Hend.) I.M.Turner
- Syzygium candelabriforme (C.B.Rob.) Merr.
- Syzygium canicortex B.Hyland
- Syzygium capillaceum (Brongn. & Gris) J.W.Dawson
- Syzygium capitatum (Merr.) Merr. & L.M.Perry
- Syzygium capituliferum Merr. & L.M.Perry
- Syzygium capoasense (Merr.) Merr.
- Syzygium cardiophyllum (Merr.) Merr.
- Syzygium caroli Diels
- Syzygium carolinense (Koidz.) Hosok.
- Syzygium carrii T.G.Hartley & L.M.Perry
- Syzygium cartilagineum Merr. & L.M.Perry
- Syzygium caryophyllatum (L.) Alston
- Syzygium caryophylliflorum (Ridl.) Merr. & L.M.Perry
- Syzygium caryophylloides (Lauterb.) Merr. & L.M.Perry
- Syzygium casiguranense (Quisumb.) Merr.
- Syzygium castaneum (Merr.) Merr. & L.M.Perry
- Syzygium caudatilimbum (Merr.) Merr. & L.M.Perry
- Syzygium caudatum (Merr.) Airy Shaw
- Syzygium cauliflorum T.G.Hartley & L.M.Perry
- Syzygium cavitense Merr.
- Syzygium celebicum (Blume) Widodo
- Syzygium cephalophorum (Ridl.) Merr. & L.M.Perry
- Syzygium cerasiforme (Blume) Merr. & L.M.Perry
- Syzygium chaii P.S.Ashton
- Syzygium chamaebuxus Diels
- Syzygium championii (Benth.) Merr. & L.M.Perry
- Syzygium chanelii Tuiwawa & Craven
- Syzygium chantaranothaianum W.K.Soh & J.Parn.
- Syzygium chavaran (Bourd.) Gamble
- Syzygium cheesmaniae Craven & Damas
- Syzygium chimanimaniense Byng
- Syzygium chloranthum (Duthie) Merr. & L.M.Perry
- Syzygium chloroleucum (King) Masam.
- Syzygium christmannii Merr. & L.M.Perry
- Syzygium christophersenii Whistler
- Syzygium chunianum Merr. & L.M.Perry
- Syzygium ciliatosetosum (Merr.) Merr.
- Syzygium cinctum Merr. & L.M.Perry
- Syzygium cinnamomeum (Vidal) Merr.
- Syzygium cladopterum (Diels) Merr. & L.M.Perry
- Syzygium clavellatum (Merr.) Merr.
- Syzygium claviflorum (Roxb.) Wall. ex Steud.
- Syzygium cleistocalyx (Merr.) P.S.Ashton
- Syzygium clementis (C.B.Rob.) Merr.
- Syzygium cleyerifolium (Yatabe) Makino
- Syzygium clusiifolium (A.Gray) Müll.Berol.
- Syzygium clypeolatum (Ridl.) I.M.Turner
- Syzygium coalitum (Greves) T.G.Hartley & L.M.Perry
- Syzygium coarctatum (Blume) Byng, N.Snow & Peter G.Wilson
- Syzygium coccineum J.W.Dawson
- Syzygium combretiflorum (Diels) Merr. & L.M.Perry
- Syzygium commersonii J.Guého & A.J.Scott
- Syzygium comorense Byng & N.Snow
- Syzygium comosum Widodo
- Syzygium conceptionis Guillaumin
- Syzygium concinnum (A.C.Sm.) Craven & Biffin
- Syzygium condensatum (Baker) Labat & Schatz
- Syzygium confertiflorum (A.Gray) Müll.Berol.
- Syzygium confertum (Korth.) Merr. & L.M.Perry
- Syzygium confusum (Blume) Bakh.f.
- Syzygium congestiflorum H.T.Chang & R.H.Miao
- Syzygium congestum (Merr.) Merr.
- Syzygium conglobatum Merr.
- Syzygium conglomeratum (Duthie) I.M.Turner
- Syzygium congolense Vermoesen
- Syzygium conicum Korth.
- Syzygium consanguineum (Merr.) Merr.
- Syzygium consimile Merr.
- Syzygium conspersipunctatum (Merr. & L.M.Perry) Craven & Biffin
- Syzygium contiguum Brambach, Byng & Culmsee
- Syzygium contractum (Poir.) J.Guého & A.J.Scott
- Syzygium copelandii (C.B.Rob.) Merr.
- Syzygium cordatilimbum (Merr.) Merr.
- Syzygium cordatum Hochst. ex C.Krauss
- Syzygium cordemoyi J.Bosser & Cadet
- Syzygium cordifoliatum (Ridl.) I.M.Turner
- Syzygium cordifolium (Wight) Walp.
- Syzygium coriaceum Bosser & J.Guého
- Syzygium cormiflorum (F.Muell.) B.Hyland
- Syzygium corneri Byng & Christenh.
- Syzygium cornifolium (Blume) Merr. & L.M.Perry
- Syzygium cornuflorum P.S.Ashton
- Syzygium corticopapyraceum (Elmer) Merr.
- Syzygium corticosum (Lour.) Merr. & L.M.Perry
- Syzygium corymbosum (Blume) DC.
- Syzygium corynanthum (F.Muell.) L.A.S.Johnson
- Syzygium corynocarpum (A.Gray) Müll.Berol.
- Syzygium costulatum (C.B.Rob.) Merr.
- Syzygium courtallense (Gamble) Alston
- Syzygium craibii Chantar. & J.Parn.
- Syzygium crassibracteatum (Merr.) Merr.
- Syzygium crassiflorum Merr. & L.M.Perry
- Syzygium crassilimbum (Merr.) Merr.
- Syzygium crassipes (C.B.Rob.) Merr.
- Syzygium crassissimum (Merr.) Merr.
- Syzygium cratermontense W.N.Takeuchi
- Syzygium cravenii B.J.Conn & Damas
- Syzygium creaghii (Ridl.) Merr. & L.M.Perry
- Syzygium crebrinerve (C.T.White) L.A.S.Johnson
- Syzygium cruriflorum Diels
- Syzygium crypteronioides P.S.Ashton
- Syzygium crystalliferum Udasco, Garrino, Aumentado, M.G.Rule & Mansibang
- Syzygium cucphuongense W.K.Soh & J.Parn.
- Syzygium cumini (L.) Skeels
- Syzygium cuneatum (Blume) Masam.
- Syzygium cuneifolium (Baker) Byng, N.Snow & Phillipson
- Syzygium cuneiforme Merr. & L.M.Perry
- Syzygium curranii (C.B.Rob.) Merr.
- Syzygium curtiflorum (Elmer) Merr.
- Syzygium curtisii (King) Merr. & L.M.Perry
- Syzygium curvistylum (Gillespie) Merr. & L.M.Perry
- Syzygium cuttingii Merr. & L.M.Perry
- Syzygium cyanophyllum (P.C.Kanjilal & D.Das) Raizada
- Syzygium cylindricum (Wight) Alston
- Syzygium cymosum (Lam.) DC.
- Syzygium cyrtophylloides (Ridl.) I.M.Turner

== D-F ==
- Syzygium danguyanum (H.Perrier) Labat & Schatz
- Syzygium dansiei B.Hyland
- Syzygium daphne (Ridl.) Merr. & L.M.Perry
- Syzygium dasyphyllum Merr. & L.M.Perry
- Syzygium davaoense (Elmer) Merr.
- Syzygium dawsonianum N.Snow, S.L.Young & Callm.
- Syzygium dealatum (Burkill) A.C.Sm.
- Syzygium debruijnii Craven & Damas
- Syzygium decipiens (Koord. & Valeton) Merr. & L.M.Perry
- Syzygium decoriflorum (Diels) Merr. & L.M.Perry
- Syzygium decussatum (A.C.Sm.) Biffin & Craven
- Syzygium delicatulum Merr. & L.M.Perry
- Syzygium dempoense (Greves) Govaerts
- Syzygium densiflorum Wall. ex Wight & Arn.
- Syzygium densinervium (Merr.) Merr.
- Syzygium deplanchei (Guillaumin) J.W.Dawson
- Syzygium devogelii Brambach, Byng & Culmsee
- Syzygium dictyoneurum Diels
- Syzygium dielsianum Merr. & L.M.Perry
- Syzygium diffusiflorum Merr.
- Syzygium diffusum (Turrill) Merr. & L.M.Perry
- Syzygium diospyrifolium (Wall. ex Duthie) S.N.Mitra
- Syzygium discophorum (Koord. & Valeton) Amshoff
- Syzygium dispansum (Ridl.) Craven & Biffin
- Syzygium divaricatum (Merr. & L.M.Perry) Craven & Biffin
- Syzygium dolichophyllum (K.Schum. & Lauterb.) Merr. & L.M.Perry
- Syzygium dolichorhynchum Diels
- Syzygium dolichostylum (Diels) Merr. & L.M.Perry
- Syzygium dubium (L.M.Perry) A.C.Sm.
- Syzygium duplomarginatum (Greves) Merr. & L.M.Perry
- Syzygium dupontii (Baker) Govaerts
- Syzygium durifolium Merr. & L.M.Perry
- Syzygium durum (Merr.) Merr.
- Syzygium duthieanum (King) Masam.
- Syzygium dyerianum (King) Chantar. & J.Parn.
- Syzygium ebaloii Merr.
- Syzygium ecostulatum (Elmer) Merr.
- Syzygium effusum (A.Gray) Müll.Berol.
- Syzygium elegans (Brongn. & Gris) J.W.Dawson
- Syzygium elephantinum Tagane
- Syzygium elliptifolium (Merr.) Merr.
- Syzygium elliptilimbum (Merr.) Merr. & L.M.Perry
- Syzygium elopurae (Ridl.) Merr. & L.M.Perry
- Syzygium emirnense (Baker) Labat & Schatz
- Syzygium endophloium B.Hyland
- Syzygium erythranthum Merr. & L.M.Perry
- Syzygium erythrocalyx (C.T.White) B.Hyland
- Syzygium erythrodoxum (S.Moore) B.Hyland
- Syzygium erythropetalum T.G.Hartley & L.M.Perry
- Syzygium escritorii Merr.
- Syzygium eucalyptoides (F.Muell.) B.Hyland
- Syzygium eugeniiforme P.S.Ashton
- Syzygium eugenioides (F.Muell.) Biffin & Craven
- Syzygium euonymifolium (F.P.Metcalf) Merr. & L.M.Perry
- Syzygium euphlebium (Hayata) Mori
- Syzygium evenulosum Merr. & L.M.Perry
- Syzygium everettii (C.B.Rob.) Merr.
- Syzygium eximiiflorum (Diels) Merr. & L.M.Perry
- Syzygium eymae Brambach, Byng & Culmsee
- Syzygium faciflorum P.S.Ashton
- Syzygium fastigiatum (Blume) Merr. & L.M.Perry
- Syzygium fazangii Craven & Damas
- Syzygium fenicis (C.B.Rob.) Merr.
- Syzygium fergusonii (Trimen) Gamble
- Syzygium fibrosum (F.M.Bailey) T.G.Hartley & L.M.Perry
- Syzygium fijiense L.M.Perry
- Syzygium filiflorum J.W.Dawson
- Syzygium filiforme Chantar. & J.Parn.
- Syzygium filipes Merr.
- Syzygium finisterrae (Lauterb.) Merr. & L.M.Perry
- Syzygium fischeri (Merr.) Merr.
- Syzygium flabellum Tuiwawa & Craven
- Syzygium flagrimonte P.S.Ashton
- Syzygium flavescens Merr. & L.M.Perry
- Syzygium flavidum T.G.Hartley & L.M.Perry
- Syzygium floribundum F.Muell.
- Syzygium flosculiferum (M.R.Hend.) Sreek.
- Syzygium fluviatile (Hemsl.) Merr. & L.M.Perry
- Syzygium fluvicola (T.G.Hartley & Craven) Craven & Biffin
- Syzygium folidorhachis Merr. & L.M.Perry
- Syzygium foremanii Craven & Damas
- Syzygium formosanum (Hayata) K.Mori
- Syzygium formosum (Wall.) Mason
- Syzygium forrestii Merr. & L.M.Perry
- Syzygium forte (F.Muell.) B.Hyland
- Syzygium fossiramulosum P.S.Ashton
- Syzygium foxworthianum (Ridl.) Merr. & L.M.Perry
- Syzygium foxworthyi (Elmer) Merr.
- Syzygium francii (Guillaumin) N.Snow, Byng & Munzinger
- Syzygium francisii (F.M.Bailey) L.A.S.Johnson
- Syzygium fraserense Byng & Christenh.
- Syzygium fraternum Miq.
- Syzygium fratris Craven
- Syzygium frodinii Craven & Damas
- Syzygium frutescens Brongn. & Gris
- Syzygium fullagarii (F.Muell.) Craven
- Syzygium fulvotomentosum P.S.Ashton
- Syzygium furfuraceum Merr. & L.M.Perry
- Syzygium fuscescens (Craib) Chantar. & J.Parn.
- Syzygium fusticuliferum (Ridl.) Merr. & L.M.Perry

== G-I ==
- Syzygium gageanum (King) I.M.Turner
- Syzygium galanthum Brambach, Byng & Culmsee
- Syzygium ganophyllum Diels
- Syzygium garciae (Merr.) Merr.
- Syzygium garcinifolioides (M.R.Hend.) Byng & Christenh.
- Syzygium garciniifolium (King) Merr. & L.M.Perry
- Syzygium garcinioides (Ridl.) Merr. & L.M.Perry
- Syzygium gardneri Thwaites
- Syzygium gaultherioides (Ridl.) Merr. & L.M.Perry
- Syzygium georgeae P.S.Ashton
- Syzygium germainii Amshoff
- Syzygium gerrardi (Harv. ex Hook.f.) Hochst. ex Burtt Davy
- Syzygium gigantifolium (Merr.) Merr.
- Syzygium gillespiei Merr. & L.M.Perry
- Syzygium gilletii De Wild.
- Syzygium gillisonii Craven & Damas
- Syzygium giorgii De Wild.
- Syzygium gitingense (Elmer) Merr.
- Syzygium gjellerupii Lauterb.
- Syzygium glabratum (DC.) Veldkamp
- Syzygium gladiatum (Ridl.) Merr. & L.M.Perry
- Syzygium glanduligerum (Ridl.) Merr. & L.M.Perry
- Syzygium glaucissimum (Haines) Rathakr. & N.C.Nair
- Syzygium glaucum (King) Chantar. & J.Parn.
- Syzygium glenum Craven
- Syzygium globiflorum (Craib) Chantar. & J.Parn.
- Syzygium globosum (Elmer) Merr.
- Syzygium glomeratum (Lam.) DC.
- Syzygium glomerulatum (Gagnep.) Merr. & L.M.Perry
- Syzygium glomeruliferum Amshoff
- Syzygium gonatanthum (Diels) Merr. & L.M.Perry
- Syzygium goniocalyx (Lauterb.) Merr. & L.M.Perry
- Syzygium goniopterum (Diels) Merr. & L.M.Perry
- Syzygium gonshanense P.Y.Bai
- Syzygium goodenovii (King) Masam.
- Syzygium gracilipaniculum P.S.Ashton
- Syzygium gracilipes (A.Gray) Merr. & L.M.Perry
- Syzygium graeffei Whistler
- Syzygium graeme-andersoniae (Ridl.) I.M.Turner
- Syzygium grande (Wight) Walp.
- Syzygium grandifolium Mansibang & Pelser
- Syzygium graveolens (F.M.Bailey) Craven & Biffin
- Syzygium grayi (Seem.) Merr. & L.M.Perry
- Syzygium grevesianum Merr. & L.M.Perry
- Syzygium griffithii (Duthie) Merr. & L.M.Perry
- Syzygium grijsii (Hance) Merr. & L.M.Perry
- Syzygium griseum (C.B.Rob.) Airy Shaw
- Syzygium guamense Byng
- Syzygium guangxiense H.T.Chang & R.H.Miao
- Syzygium guehoi Bosser & Florens
- Syzygium guillauminii J.W.Dawson
- Syzygium guineense (Willd.) DC.
- Syzygium gununganum Byng & Christenh.
- Syzygium gustavioides (F.M.Bailey) B.Hyland
- Syzygium gyrostemoneum Diels
- Syzygium hainanense H.T.Chang & R.H.Miao
- Syzygium halophilum (Merr.) Masam.
- Syzygium hancei Merr. & L.M.Perry
- Syzygium handelii Merr. & L.M.Perry
- Syzygium haniffii (M.R.Hend.) I.M.Turner
- Syzygium harmandii (Gagnep.) Merr. & L.M.Perry
- Syzygium hartleyi Craven & Damas
- Syzygium havilandii (Merr.) Merr. & L.M.Perry
- Syzygium hebephyllum Melville
- Syzygium hedraiophyllum (F.Muell.) Craven & Biffin
- Syzygium helferi (Duthie) Chantar. & J.Parn.
- Syzygium heloanthum Diels
- Syzygium hemachandrae Jayasinghe
- Syzygium hemilamprum (F.Muell.) Craven & Biffin
- Syzygium hemisphericum (Wight) Alston
- Syzygium hemsleyanum (King) Chantar. & J.Parn.
- Syzygium hendersonii Merr.
- Syzygium hentyi Craven & Damas
- Syzygium heterobotrys Merr. & L.M.Perry
- Syzygium hirtum (Korth.) Merr. & L.M.Perry
- Syzygium hodgkinsoniae (F.Muell.) L.A.S.Johnson
- Syzygium holttumii (Ridl.) Byng & Christenh.
- Syzygium homichlophilum Diels
- Syzygium honbaense Tagane, V.S.Dang & Yahara
- Syzygium hooglandii Craven & Damas
- Syzygium hookeri M.V.Ramana, Chorghe & Venu
- Syzygium horsfieldii (Miq.) Widodo
- Syzygium hoseanum (King) Merr. & L.M.Perry
- Syzygium houttuynii Merr. & L.M.Perry
- Syzygium houttuyniifolia P.S.Ashton
- Syzygium howii Merr. & L.M.Perry
- Syzygium hughcumingii Merr.
- Syzygium huillense (Hiern) Engl.
- Syzygium hullettianum (King) Chantar. & J.Parn.
- Syzygium humbertii Byng
- Syzygium humblotii Labat & Schatz
- Syzygium hutchinsonii (C.B.Robinson) Merr.
- Syzygium hylochare (Diels) Merr. & L.M.Perry
- Syzygium hylophilum (K.Schum. & Lauterb.) Merr. & L.M.Perry
- Syzygium hypsipetes Airy Shaw
- Syzygium idanum Craven & Damas
- Syzygium idrisii P.S.Ashton
- Syzygium ignambiense (Baker f.) N.Snow & Byng
- Syzygium iliasii P.S.Ashton
- Syzygium ilocanum (Merr.) Merr.
- Syzygium imitans Merr. & L.M.Perry
- Syzygium imperiale P.S.Ashton
- Syzygium impressum N.H.Xia, Y.F.Deng & K.L.Yip
- Syzygium inasense (King) I.M.Turner
- Syzygium incarnatum (Elmer) Merr. & L.M.Perry
- Syzygium incrassatum (Elmer) Merr.
- Syzygium infrarubiginosum H.T.Chang & R.H.Miao
- Syzygium ingens (F.Muell. ex C.Moore) Craven & Biffin
- Syzygium inophylloides (A.Gray) Müll.Berol.
- Syzygium inophyllum DC.
- Syzygium inopinatum Amshoff
- Syzygium insulare T.G.Hartley & L.M.Perry
- Syzygium × intermedium Engl. & Brehmer
- Syzygium intumescens (C.B.Rob.) Merr.
- Syzygium isabelense (Quisumb.) Merr.
- Syzygium iteophyllum Diels
- Syzygium iwahigense (Elmer) Merr.
- Syzygium ixoroides Chantar. & J.Parn.

== J-L ==
- Syzygium jaffrei J.W.Dawson
- Syzygium jaherii Merr. & L.M.Perry
- Syzygium jainii Harid. & R.R.Rao
- Syzygium jambos (L.) Alston
- Syzygium jasminifolium (Ridl.) Chantar. & J.Parn.
- Syzygium jienfunicum H.T.Chang & R.H.Miao
- Syzygium jiewhoei Hambali, Sunarti & Y.W.Low
- Syzygium johnsonii (F.Muell.) B.Hyland
- Syzygium jugorum (Craib) Byng & Christenh.
- Syzygium kabaense (Greves) Govaerts
- Syzygium kajewskii Guillaumin
- Syzygium kalahiense Korth.
- Syzygium kampotense Chantar.
- Syzygium kanneliyense Kosterm.
- Syzygium karimatense Merr. & L.M.Perry
- Syzygium kemamanense (M.R.Hend.) I.M.Turner
- Syzygium keroanthum (Diels) Merr. & L.M.Perry
- Syzygium kerrii Chantar. & J.Parn.
- Syzygium kerstingii Engl.
- Syzygium ketambense Widodo
- Syzygium keysseri (Schltr. ex Diels) Merr. & L.M.Perry
- Syzygium khaoyaiense (Chantar. & J.Parn.) Craven & Biffin
- Syzygium khasianum (Duthie) N.P.Balakr.
- Syzygium khoonmengianum P.S.Ashton
- Syzygium kiahii (M.R.Hend.) I.M.Turner
- Syzygium kiauense (Merr.) Merr. & L.M.Perry
- Syzygium kinabaluense (Stapf) Merr. & L.M.Perry
- Syzygium kipidamasii W.N.Takeuchi
- Syzygium klampok (Miq.) Amshoff
- Syzygium klossii (Ridl.) Masam.
- Syzygium koghianum Petitm. & Bonati
- Syzygium kokomo Craven
- Syzygium komatiense Byng & Pahlad.
- Syzygium koniamboense J.W.Dawson
- Syzygium koordersianum (King) I.M.Turner
- Syzygium korthalsianum (Miq.) Miq.
- Syzygium korthalsii Widodo
- Syzygium kosteri Craven & Damas
- Syzygium koumacense J.W.Dawson
- Syzygium kriegeri (Guillaumin) J.W.Dawson
- Syzygium kudatense P.S.Ashton
- Syzygium kuebiniense J.W.Dawson
- Syzygium kui Craven & Damas
- Syzygium kuiense B.J.Conn & Damas
- Syzygium kuneneense Swanepoel & A.E.van Wyk
- Syzygium kunstleri (King) Bahadur & R.C.Gaur
- Syzygium kuranda (F.M.Bailey) B.Hyland
- Syzygium kurzii (Duthie) N.P.Balakr.
- Syzygium kusukusuense (Hayata) Mori
- Syzygium kutubuense Craven & Damas
- Syzygium kwangtungense (Merr.) Merr.
- Syzygium lababiense B.J.Conn & Damas
- Syzygium labatii Byng & N.Snow
- Syzygium lacustre (C.B.Rob.) Merr.
- Syzygium laetum (Buch.-Ham.) Gandhi
- Syzygium lagerstroemioides Merr. & L.M.Perry
- Syzygium lakshnakarae Chantar. & J.Parn.
- Syzygium lambirense P.S.Ashton
- Syzygium lamii Merr. & L.M.Perry
- Syzygium lampeapiense Sunarti & Rugayah
- Syzygium lamprophyllum Diels
- Syzygium lanceolarium (Roxb.) N.P.Balakr.
- Syzygium lanceolatum (Lam.) Wight & Arn.
- Syzygium lancilimbum (Merr.) Merr.
- Syzygium laqueatum Merr. & L.M.Perry
- Syzygium lasianthifolium H.T.Chang & R.H.Miao
- Syzygium lateriflorum Brongn. & Gris
- Syzygium latifolium (Poir.) DC.
- Syzygium laurifolium (DC.) N.P.Balakr.
- Syzygium laxeracemosum (Guillaumin) J.W.Dawson
- Syzygium laxiflorum (Blume) DC.
- Syzygium lecardii Guillaumin
- Syzygium legatii Burtt Davy & Greenway
- Syzygium lehuntii (F.M.Bailey) Merr. & L.M.Perry
- Syzygium lenbrassii Craven & Biffin
- Syzygium leonhardii (Diels) Merr. & L.M.Perry
- Syzygium leptoneurum Diels
- Syzygium leptophlebioides Merr. & L.M.Perry
- Syzygium leptophlebium Diels
- Syzygium leptopodium Merr. & L.M.Perry
- Syzygium leptostemon (Korth.) Merr. & L.M.Perry
- Syzygium leucanthum L.M.Perry
- Syzygium leucocladum Merr. & L.M.Perry
- Syzygium leucoxylon Korth.
- Syzygium levinei (Merr.) Merr.
- Syzygium lewisii Alston
- Syzygium leytense (Elmer) Merr.
- Syzygium lifuanum Däniker
- Syzygium linocieroideum (King) I.M.Turner
- Syzygium littorale (Blume) Amshoff
- Syzygium littorosum Byng
- Syzygium llanosii (Merr.) Merr.
- Syzygium loiseleurioides (Baker) Govaerts
- Syzygium longifolium (Brongn. & Gris) J.W.Dawson
- Syzygium longipedicellatum (Merr.) Merr.
- Syzygium longipes (Diels) Merr. & L.M.Perry
- Syzygium longipetiolatum Widodo
- Syzygium longissimum (Merr.) Merr.
- Syzygium longistylum (Merr.) Merr.
- Syzygium lorentzianum Lauterb.
- Syzygium lorofolium Merr.
- Syzygium ludovicii N.Snow
- Syzygium luehmannii (F.Muell.) L.A.S.Johnson
- Syzygium lugubre (H.Perrier) Labat & Schatz
- Syzygium lunduense (Merr.) Merr. & L.M.Perry
- Syzygium luteum (C.B.Rob.) Merr.
- Syzygium luzonense (Merr.) Merr.

== M-O ==
- Syzygium macgregorii (C.B.Rob.) Merr.
- Syzygium macilwraithianum B.Hyland
- Syzygium mackinnonianum (B.Hyland) Craven & Biffin
- Syzygium macranthum Brongn. & Gris
- Syzygium macrocalyx Merr. & L.M.Perry
- Syzygium macromyrtus (Koord. & Valeton) Merr. & L.M.Perry
- Syzygium madangense T.G.Hartley & L.M.Perry
- Syzygium magnoliifolium (Blume) DC.
- Syzygium maingayi Chantar. & J.Parn.
- Syzygium mainitense (Elmer) Merr.
- Syzygium maire (A.Cunn.) Sykes & Garn.-Jones
- Syzygium makul Gaertn.
- Syzygium malabaricum (Bedd.) Gamble
- Syzygium malaccense (L.) Merr. & L.M.Perry
- Syzygium malagsam (Elmer) Merr.
- Syzygium mamillatum Bosser & J.Guého
- Syzygium mananquil (Blanco) Merr.
- Syzygium maneauense Craven & Damas
- Syzygium manii (King) N.P.Balakr.
- Syzygium maraca Craven & Biffin
- Syzygium marginatum Korth.
- Syzygium martelinoi (Merr.) Merr.
- Syzygium masukuense (Baker) R.E.Fr.
- Syzygium mauritianum J.Guého & A.J.Scott
- Syzygium mauritsii Govaerts
- Syzygium medium (Korth.) Merr. & L.M.Perry
- Syzygium megalanthum (C.B.Rob.) Merr.
- Syzygium megalospermum (K.Schum. & Lauterb.) Merr. & L.M.Perry
- Syzygium megistophyllum Merr. & L.M.Perry
- Syzygium melanophilum H.T.Chang & R.H.Miao
- Syzygium melanostictum (Miq.) Craven & Biffin
- Syzygium melastomifolium (Blume) Veldkamp
- Syzygium melliodorum (C.B.Rob.) Merr.
- Syzygium meorianum J.W.Dawson
- Syzygium merokense (Greves) Merr. & L.M.Perry
- Syzygium merrittianum (C.B.Rob.) Merr.
- Syzygium mesekerrak Lorence & Byng
- Syzygium micans Brongn. & Gris
- Syzygium micklethwaitii Verdc.
- Syzygium micrandrum (Ridl.) Merr. & L.M.Perry
- Syzygium micranthum Thwaites
- Syzygium microcymum (Koord. & Valeton) Amshoff
- Syzygium microphyllum Gamble
- Syzygium micropodum (Baker) Labat & Schatz
- Syzygium millariae Craven & Damas
- Syzygium millsii (M.R.Hend.) I.M.Turner
- Syzygium mimicum (Merr.) Merr.
- Syzygium mindorense (C.B.Rob.) Masam.
- Syzygium minimum (Blume) Airy Shaw
- Syzygium minus A.C.Sm.
- Syzygium minutiflorum Miq.
- Syzygium minutuliflorum (F.Muell.) B.Hyland
- Syzygium mirabile (Merr.) Merr.
- Syzygium mirandae (Merr.) Merr.
- Syzygium mishmiense Chatterjee
- Syzygium monetarium (Ridl.) Merr. & L.M.Perry
- Syzygium monimioides Craven
- Syzygium monospermum Craven
- Syzygium montanum Gamble
- Syzygium monticola Merr. & L.M.Perry
- Syzygium montis-adam Kosterm.
- Syzygium montis-venetus Craven
- Syzygium moorei (F.Muell.) L.A.S.Johnson
- Syzygium mortonianum Byng
- Syzygium mouanum Guillaumin
- Syzygium moultonii (Merr.) Merr. & L.M.Perry
- Syzygium muelleri (Miq.) Miq.
- Syzygium mulgraveanum (B.Hyland) Craven & Biffin
- Syzygium multibracteolatum (Merr.) Merr. & L.M.Perry
- Syzygium multiglandulosum Merr. & L.M.Perry
- Syzygium multinerve (C.B.Rob.) Merr.
- Syzygium multipetalum Pancher ex Brongn. & Gris
- Syzygium multipuncticulatum Merr.
- Syzygium mundagam (Bourd.) Chithra
- Syzygium munnarense Shareef, P.E.Roy & Krishnaraj
- Syzygium munroi (Wight) Chandrab.
- Syzygium myhendrae (Bedd. ex Brandis) Gamble
- Syzygium myriadenum Merr. & L.M.Perry
- Syzygium myrianthum (King) I.M.Turner
- Syzygium myrsinifolium (Hance) Merr. & L.M.Perry
- Syzygium myrtifolium Walp.
- Syzygium myrtilloides Merr. & L.M.Perry
- Syzygium myrtillus (Stapf) Merr. & L.M.Perry
- Syzygium myrtoides (A.Gray) R.Schmid
- Syzygium naiadum (Diels) Merr. & L.M.Perry
- Syzygium namborense D.Dey, N.Devi & J.Sarma
- Syzygium namosialangense Widodo & E.Lucas
- Syzygium nandarivatense (Gillespie) L.M.Perry
- Syzygium nanpingense Y.Y.Qian
- Syzygium nanum J.W.Dawson
- Syzygium napiforme (Koord. & Valeton) Merr. & L.M.Perry
- Syzygium neesianum Arn.
- Syzygium nemorale Merr. & L.M.Perry
- Syzygium neocaledonicum (Seem.) J.W.Dawson
- Syzygium neoeugenioides N.Snow, Byng & J.W.Dawson
- Syzygium neolaurifolium N.Snow & Byng
- Syzygium neriifolium Becc. ex Merr. & L.M.Perry
- Syzygium nervosum DC.
- Syzygium neurocalyx (A.Gray) Christoph.
- Syzygium neurophyllum N.Snow
- Syzygium ngadimanianum (M.R.Hend.) I.M.Turner
- Syzygium ngheanense N.S.Lý, N.D.Do & T.H.Lê
- Syzygium ngoyense (Schltr.) Guillaumin
- Syzygium niassense Byng & J.E.Burrows
- Syzygium nicobaricum (King) Rathakr. & N.C.Nair
- Syzygium nidie Guillaumin
- Syzygium nigrans (Gagnep.) Craven & Biffin
- Syzygium nigricans (King) Merr. & L.M.Perry
- Syzygium nigropunctatum Merr. & L.M.Perry
- Syzygium nitens J.W.Dawson
- Syzygium nitidulum (Ridl.) I.M.Turner
- Syzygium nitidum Benth.
- Syzygium nitrasirirakii Chantar. & J.Parn.
- Syzygium nivae Barbhuiya, J.Sarma & S.Dey
- Syzygium nomoa Guillaumin
- Syzygium normanbiensc T.G.Hartley & L.M.Perry
- Syzygium novoguineense Merr. & L.M.Perry
- Syzygium novotnyi Craven & Damas
- Syzygium nummularium Airy Shaw
- Syzygium nusatenggaraense Sunarti & Y.W.Low
- Syzygium nutans Merr. & L.M.Perry
- Syzygium oblanceolatum (C.B.Rob.) Merr.
- Syzygium oblancilimbum H.T.Chang & R.H.Miao
- Syzygium oblatum (Roxb.) Wall. ex A.M.Cowan & Cowan
- Syzygium obliquinervium (Elmer) Merr.
- Syzygium oblongifolium (Gillespie) Merr. & L.M.Perry
- Syzygium occidentale (Bourd.) Gandhi
- Syzygium occlusum Miq.
- Syzygium odoardoi Merr. & L.M.Perry
- Syzygium odoratum (Lour.) DC.
- Syzygium oleosum (F.Muell.) B.Hyland
- Syzygium oligadelphum (Christoph.) Merr. & L.M.Perry
- Syzygium oliganthum Thwaites
- Syzygium oligomyrum Diels
- Syzygium omissum Mansibang & Fernando
- Syzygium onesimum Merr. & L.M.Perry
- Syzygium onivense (H.Perrier) Labat & Schatz
- Syzygium oransbariense Mustaqim, Y.W.Low & Heatubun
- Syzygium oreophilum I.M.Turner
- Syzygium orites (Ridl.) I.M.Turner
- Syzygium orthoneurum Diels
- Syzygium ovale Korth.
- Syzygium ovalifolium (Blume) Merr. & L.M.Perry
- Syzygium owariense (P.Beauv.) Benth.
- Syzygium oxyphyllum Diels

== P ==
- Syzygium pachyanthum (Diels) Merr. & L.M.Perry
- Syzygium pachycladum (K.Schum. & Lauterb.) Merr. & L.M.Perry
- Syzygium pachyphyllum (Kurz) Merr. & L.M.Perry
- Syzygium pachyrrachis Amshoff
- Syzygium pachysarcum (Gagnep.) Merr. & L.M.Perry
- Syzygium pachysepalum Merr. & L.M.Perry
- Syzygium padangense Widodo & E.Lucas
- Syzygium pahangense (Ridl.) I.M.Turner
- Syzygium palauense (Kaneh.) Hosok.
- Syzygium palawanense (C.B.Rob.) Merr. & L.M.Perry
- Syzygium palghatense Gamble
- Syzygium pallens Merr. & L.M.Perry
- Syzygium pallidilimbum Merr. & L.M.Perry
- Syzygium pallidulum (Ridl.) I.M.Turner
- Syzygium pallidum Merr.
- Syzygium palodense Shareef, E.S.S.Kumar & Shaju
- Syzygium paludosum P.S.Ashton
- Syzygium panayense (Merr.) Merr.
- Syzygium pancheri Brongn. & Gris
- Syzygium panduriforme (Elmer) Merr.
- Syzygium paniculatum Gaertn.
- Syzygium paniense (Baker f.) J.W.Dawson
- Syzygium panzeri Merr. & L.M.Perry
- Syzygium papillosum (Duthie) Merr. & L.M.Perry
- Syzygium papyraceum B.Hyland
- Syzygium paradoxum (Merr.) Masam.
- Syzygium paraiense Merr. & L.M.Perry
- Syzygium parameswaranii M.Mohanan & A.N.Henry
- Syzygium parkeri (Baker) Labat & Schatz
- Syzygium parnellii Byng & Christenh.
- Syzygium parvicarpum J.W.Dawson
- Syzygium parvifolium (Engl.) Mildbr.
- Syzygium parvipomum Fernando & Mansibang
- Syzygium parvulum Mildbr. ex Amshoff
- Syzygium pascasioii (Merr.) Merr.
- Syzygium patens Korth.
- Syzygium patentinerve Christoph.
- Syzygium patentinervium (P.S.Ashton) Byng & Christenh.
- Syzygium paucinervium (Chantar. & J.Parn.) Byng & Christenh.
- Syzygium paucipunctatum (Koord. & Valeton) Merr. & L.M.Perry
- Syzygium paucivenium (C.B.Rob.) Merr.
- Syzygium pauper (Ridl.) I.M.Turner
- Syzygium pellucidum (Duthie) N.P.Balakr.
- Syzygium penasii (Merr.) Merr.
- Syzygium pendens (Duthie) I.M.Turner
- Syzygium pendulinum J.W.Dawson
- Syzygium penibukanense Merr. & L.M.Perry
- Syzygium pennelii (Guillaumin) J.W.Dawson
- Syzygium peregrinum (Blume) Merr. & L.M.Perry
- Syzygium perforatum (Miq.) Widodo
- Syzygium pergamaceum (Greves) Merr. & L.M.Perry
- Syzygium pergamentaceum (King) Chantar. & J.Parn.
- Syzygium periyarense Augustine & Sasidh.
- Syzygium perryae I.M.Turner
- Syzygium perspicuinervium (Merr.) Masam.
- Syzygium petakense Merr. & L.M.Perry
- Syzygium petraeum Diels
- Syzygium petrinense Bosser & J.Guého
- Syzygium petrophilum Merr. & L.M.Perry
- Syzygium phacelanthum (Diels) Merr. & L.M.Perry
- Syzygium phaeophyllum Merr. & L.M.Perry
- Syzygium phaeostictum Merr. & L.M.Perry
- Syzygium phamhoangii Tagane, V.S.Dang & Yahara
- Syzygium phanerophlebium (C.B.Rob.) Merr.
- Syzygium phengklaii (Chantar. & J.Parn.) Craven & Biffin
- Syzygium philippinense (C.B.Rob.) Merr.
- Syzygium phillyreifolium (Baker) Labat & Schatz
- Syzygium phoukhaokhouayense Soulad., Tagane & Yahara
- Syzygium phryganodes Merr. & L.M.Perry
- Syzygium pierrei (Gagnep.) Merr. & L.M.Perry
- Syzygium pilgerianum (K.Schum. & Lauterb.) Merr. & L.M.Perry
- Syzygium piluliferum Craven & Biffin
- Syzygium platycarpum (Diels) Merr. & L.M.Perry
- Syzygium platypodum Diels
- Syzygium plumbeum (King) I.M.Turner
- Syzygium plumeum (Ridl.) Merr. & L.M.Perry
- Syzygium pluviatile T.G.Hartley & L.M.Perry
- Syzygium polisense Merr.
- Syzygium politum (King) I.M.Turner
- Syzygium polyanthum (Wight) Walp.
- Syzygium polycephaloides (C.B.Rob.) Merr.
- Syzygium polycephalum (Miq.) Merr. & L.M.Perry
- Syzygium polypetaloideum Merr. & L.M.Perry
- Syzygium polypetalum (Wall.) Merr. & L.M.Perry
- Syzygium polyphlebium (Diels) Merr. & L.M.Perry
- Syzygium pondoense Engl.
- Syzygium ponmudianum A.K.Sreekala, Ramas., D.S.Pillai & Surendr.
- Syzygium pontianakense Merr. & L.M.Perry
- Syzygium populifolium (Baker) J.Guého & A.J.Scott
- Syzygium porphyranthum (Ridl.) I.M.Turner
- Syzygium porphyrocarpum (Greves) Merr. & L.M.Perry
- Syzygium potamicum Kosterm.
- Syzygium poyanum J.W.Dawson
- Syzygium praecox (Roxb.) Rathakr. & N.C.Nair
- Syzygium praestantilimbum P.S.Ashton
- Syzygium praestigiosum (M.R.Hend.) I.M.Turner
- Syzygium praetermissum (Gage) N.P.Balakr.
- Syzygium prainianum (King) Chantar. & J.Parn.
- Syzygium prasiniflorum (Ridl.) Merr. & L.M.Perry
- Syzygium pratense Byng
- Syzygium pringlei (B.Hyland) Craven & Biffin
- Syzygium prolatum Craven & Damas
- Syzygium propinquum (Guillaumin) J.W.Dawson
- Syzygium pseudocalcicola Craven & Biffin
- Syzygium pseudoclaviflorum (M.R.Hend.) I.M.Turner
- Syzygium pseudofastigiatum B.Hyland
- Syzygium pseudolaetum (C.E.C.Fisch.) Merr. & L.M.Perry
- Syzygium pseudomalaccense (Vieill. ex Brongn. & Gris) Govaerts
- Syzygium pseudomegistophyllum W.N.Takeuchi
- Syzygium pseudomolle (M.R.Hend.) I.M.Turner
- Syzygium pseudopinnatum Däniker
- Syzygium pterocalyx Brongn. & Gris
- Syzygium pterocarpum (Vieill. ex Pancher & Sebert) Govaerts
- Syzygium pterophorum Merr. & L.M.Perry
- Syzygium pteropodum (K.Schum. & Lauterb.) Merr. & L.M.Perry
- Syzygium pterotum B.J.Conn & Damas
- Syzygium puberulum Merr. & L.M.Perry
- Syzygium pulaiense I.M.Turner
- Syzygium pulgarense (C.B.Rob.) Merr.
- Syzygium pullei Diels
- Syzygium punctilimbum (Merr.) Merr. & L.M.Perry
- Syzygium purpureum (L.M.Perry) A.C.Sm.
- Syzygium purpuricarpum N.Snow
- Syzygium purpuriflorum (Elmer) Merr.
- Syzygium pustulatum (Duthie) Merr.
- Syzygium putii Chantar. & J.Parn.
- Syzygium pycnanthum Merr. & L.M.Perry
- Syzygium pyneei Byng, V.Florens & Baider
- Syzygium pyrifolium (Blume) DC.
- Syzygium pyriforme Merr. & L.M.Perry
- Syzygium pyrocarpum (Greves) Merr. & L.M.Perry
- Syzygium pyrrophloeum Diels

== Q-R ==
- Syzygium quadrangulare Guillaumin
- Syzygium quadrangulatum (A.Gray) Merr. & L.M.Perry
- Syzygium quadratum (King) I.M.Turner
- Syzygium quadrialatum Teijsm. & Binn.
- Syzygium quadribracteatum (M.R.Hend.) I.M.Turner
- Syzygium quadricostatum P.S.Ashton
- Syzygium quadrisepalum (P.S.Ashton) Byng & Christenh.
- Syzygium quoctrianum W.K.Soh, H.V.Sam & J.Parn.
- Syzygium racemosum (Blume) DC.
- Syzygium radiciflorum Craven & Damas
- Syzygium rakotovaoanum N.Snow
- Syzygium rama-varmae (Bourd.) Chithra
- Syzygium rambutyense N.Snow
- Syzygium ramiflorum Airy Shaw
- Syzygium ramilepis J.W.Dawson
- Syzygium ramosii (C.B.Rob.) Merr.
- Syzygium ramosissimum (Blume) N.P.Balakr.
- Syzygium rampans (Baker) J.Guého & A.J.Scott
- Syzygium randianum Merr. & L.M.Perry
- Syzygium rechingeri Merr. & L.M.Perry
- Syzygium recurvovenosum (Lauterb.) Diels
- Syzygium refertum (Craib) Chantar. & J.Parn.
- Syzygium rehderianum Merr. & L.M.Perry
- Syzygium reineckei Whistler
- Syzygium rejangense Merr. & L.M.Perry
- Syzygium remotifolium (Ridl.) Merr. & L.M.Perry
- Syzygium resa (B.Hyland) Craven & Biffin
- Syzygium reticulatum (Wight) Walp.
- Syzygium retinervium (Merr. & L.M.Perry) Craven & Biffin
- Syzygium revolutum (Wight) Walp.
- Syzygium rheophyticum P.S.Ashton
- Syzygium rhizophorum (Boerl. & Koord.-Schum.) Govaerts
- Syzygium rhomboideum (Ridl.) I.M.Turner
- Syzygium rhopalanthum Schltr.
- Syzygium rhysgardneri Craven
- Syzygium richardsonianum Merr. & L.M.Perry
- Syzygium richii (A.Gray) Merr. & L.M.Perry
- Syzygium ridleyi (King) Chantar. & J.Parn.
- Syzygium ridsdalei Craven & N.Snow
- Syzygium rigens (Craib) Chantar. & J.Parn.
- Syzygium rigidifolium Merr.
- Syzygium riparium (Diels) Merr. & L.M.Perry
- Syzygium ripicola (Craib) Merr. & L.M.Perry
- Syzygium rivulare Vieill. ex Guillaumin
- Syzygium rizalense (Merr.) Merr.
- Syzygium robbinsii T.G.Hartley & L.M.Perry
- Syzygium robertii (Merr.) Merr.
- Syzygium robinsonii (Elmer) Merr.
- Syzygium robustum Miq.
- Syzygium rockii Merr. & L.M.Perry
- Syzygium roemeri (Lauterb.) Merr. & L.M.Perry
- Syzygium rolfei Merr.
- Syzygium rosaceum Diels
- Syzygium rosenbluthii (C.B.Rob.) Merr.
- Syzygium roseomarginatum (C.B.Rob.) Merr. & L.M.Perry
- Syzygium roseum Merr. & L.M.Perry
- Syzygium rostadonis (Ridl.) I.M.Turner
- Syzygium rostratum (Blume) DC.
- Syzygium rosulentum (Ridl.) Merr. & L.M.Perry
- Syzygium rotundifolium Arn.
- Syzygium rowlandii Sprague
- Syzygium royenii Craven & Damas
- Syzygium rubens (Roxb.) Walp.
- Syzygium rubescens (A.Gray) Müll.Berol.
- Syzygium rubicundum Wight & Arn.
- Syzygium rubrimolle B.Hyland
- Syzygium rubroalabastrum Craven & Damas
- Syzygium rubropunctatum (Ridl.) Merr. & L.M.Perry
- Syzygium rubropurpureum (C.B.Rob.) Airy Shaw
- Syzygium rubrovenium (C.B.Rob.) Merr.
- Syzygium rugosum Korth.
- Syzygium rumphii (Merr.) Govaerts
- Syzygium rysopodum Merr. & L.M.Perry

== S ==
- Syzygium sabangense (Lauterb.) Merr. & L.M.Perry
- Syzygium sahyadricum Sujanapal, Robi & Sasidh.
- Syzygium sakalavarum (H.Perrier) Labat & Schatz
- Syzygium salicifolium J.Graham
- Syzygium saliciforme Merr. & L.M.Perry
- Syzygium salicinum (Ridl.) Merr. & L.M.Perry
- Syzygium salictoides (Ridl.) I.M.Turner
- Syzygium salignum (Miq.) Rathakr. & N.C.Nair
- Syzygium salomonense (Hemsl.) Merr. & L.M.Perry
- Syzygium salpinganthum (Greves) Merr. & L.M.Perry
- Syzygium salwinense Merr. & L.M.Perry
- Syzygium samarangense (Blume) Merr. & L.M.Perry
- Syzygium sambiranense (H.Perrier) Labat & Schatz
- Syzygium sambogense T.G.Hartley & L.M.Perry
- Syzygium samianum W.K.Soh & J.Parn.
- Syzygium samoense (Burkill) Whistler
- Syzygium sandwicense (A.Gray) Müll.Berol.
- Syzygium sanjappanum M.V.Ramana
- Syzygium santosii (Merr.) Merr.
- Syzygium sarmentosum J.W.Dawson
- Syzygium sasidharanii Sujanapal
- Syzygium saundersii Craven
- Syzygium savaiiense (A.Gray) Müll.Berol.
- Syzygium saxatile H.T.Chang & R.H.Miao
- Syzygium sayeri (F.Muell.) B.Hyland
- Syzygium scabrum Tagane, Soulad. & Yahara
- Syzygium scalarinerve (King) I.M.Turner
- Syzygium schistaceum J.W.Dawson
- Syzygium schlechteri Diels
- Syzygium schlechterianum Hochr.
- Syzygium schmidii Rathakr. & N.C.Nair
- Syzygium schumannianum (Nied.) Diels
- Syzygium schwenckii Teijsm. & Binn.
- Syzygium sclerophyllum Thwaites
- Syzygium scolopophyllum (Ridl.) Masam.
- Syzygium scortechinii (King) Chantar. & J.Parn.
- Syzygium scytophyllum Diels
- Syzygium seemannianum Merr. & L.M.Perry
- Syzygium seemannii (A.Gray) Biffin & Craven
- Syzygium selukaifolium P.S.Ashton
- Syzygium sessililimbum (Merr.) Merr.
- Syzygium setosum (King) I.M.Turner
- Syzygium sexangulatum (Miq.) Amshoff
- Syzygium sharoniae B.Hyland
- Syzygium shimbaense (Verdc.) Byng & Christenh.
- Syzygium siamense (Craib) Chantar. & J.Parn.
- Syzygium sichuanense H.T.Chang & R.H.Miao
- Syzygium siderocola (Merr.) Merr.
- Syzygium silamense P.S.Ashton
- Syzygium simile (Merr.) Merr.
- Syzygium simillimum Merr. & L.M.Perry
- Syzygium singaporense (King) Airy Shaw
- Syzygium sipirokense Widodo & Veldkamp
- Syzygium sirindhorniae Chantar., Suksathan & Wongnak
- Syzygium skiophilum (Duthie) Airy Shaw
- Syzygium sleumeri Craven
- Syzygium slootenii Merr. & L.M.Perry
- Syzygium smalianum (Brandis) D.G.Long
- Syzygium smetsianum Byng & Christenh.
- Syzygium smithii (Poir.) Nied.
- Syzygium snowianum W.N.Takeuchi
- Syzygium soepadmoi P.S.Ashton
- Syzygium sogerense (Greves) Merr. & L.M.Perry
- Syzygium sorongense (T.G.Hartley & Craven) Craven & Biffin
- Syzygium spathulatum Thwaites
- Syzygium speciosissimum (C.B.Rob.) Merr.
- Syzygium spectabile Merr. & L.M.Perry
- Syzygium spissifolium (Ridl.) I.M.Turner
- Syzygium splendens (Blume) Merr. & L.M.Perry
- Syzygium squamatum Merr. & L.M.Perry
- Syzygium squamiferum (C.B.Rob.) Merr.
- Syzygium sriganesanii K.Ravik. & V.Lakshm.
- Syzygium stapfianum (King) I.M.Turner
- Syzygium staudtii (Engl.) Mildbr.
- Syzygium steenisii Merr. & L.M.Perry
- Syzygium stelechanthoides (Kaneh.) M.W.Tornab. & W.L.Wagner
- Syzygium stelechanthum (Diels) Glassman
- Syzygium stenocladum Merr. & L.M.Perry
- Syzygium stenurum Merr. & L.M.Perry
- Syzygium sterrophyllum Merr. & L.M.Perry
- Syzygium stipitatum P.S.Ashton
- Syzygium stipulare (Blume) Craven & T.G.Hartley
- Syzygium stocksii (Duthie) Gamble
- Syzygium striatulum (C.B.Rob.) Merr.
- Syzygium subalatum (Ridl.) Merr. & L.M.Perry
- Syzygium subamplexicaule Merr. & L.M.Perry
- Syzygium subcapitulatum Miq.
- Syzygium subcaudatum (Merr.) Merr.
- Syzygium subcordatum (Verdc.) Byng & N.Snow
- Syzygium subcorymbosum Merr. & L.M.Perry
- Syzygium subcrenatum Merr. & L.M.Perry
- Syzygium subdecussatum (Duthie) I.M.Turner
- Syzygium suberosum Craven
- Syzygium subfalcatum (C.B.Rob.) Merr.
- Syzygium subfoetidum (C.B.Rob.) Merr.
- Syzygium subglobosum Merr. & L.M.Perry
- Syzygium subhorizontale (King) Chantar. & J.Parn.
- Syzygium subimbricatum Whistler
- Syzygium subisense P.S.Ashton
- Syzygium sublaetum (Craib) Byng & Christenh.
- Syzygium subnodosum Miq.
- Syzygium suborbiculare (Benth.) T.G.Hartley & L.M.Perry
- Syzygium subrotundifolium (C.B.Rob.) Merr.
- Syzygium subscandens Widodo
- Syzygium subsessile (C.B.Rob.) Merr.
- Syzygium subsessiliflorum (Merr.) Merr.
- Syzygium subsessilifolium (Merr.) Merr. & L.M.Perry
- Syzygium subsimile Diels
- Syzygium subtile Miq.
- Syzygium sulcistylum (C.B.Rob.) Merr.
- Syzygium sulitii Merr.
- Syzygium sulphuratum (Ridl.) Govaerts
- Syzygium sumatranum (Miq.) Widodo
- Syzygium surigaense (Merr.) Merr.
- Syzygium suringarianum (Koord. & Valeton) Amshoff
- Syzygium swettenhamianum (King) I.M.Turner
- Syzygium sylvicola T.G.Hartley & L.M.Perry
- Syzygium symingtonianum (M.R.Hend.) I.M.Turner
- Syzygium synaptoneurum (K.Schum. & Lauterb.) Merr. & L.M.Perry
- Syzygium syzygioides (Miq.) Merr. & L.M.Perry

== T-U ==
- Syzygium taeniatum Diels
- Syzygium tahanense (Ridl.) I.M.Turner
- Syzygium taipingense (M.R.Hend.) I.M.Turner
- Syzygium taiwanicum H.T.Chang & R.H.Miao
- Syzygium takeuchii Craven & Damas
- Syzygium tapiaka (H.Perrier) Labat & Schatz
- Syzygium tavaiense (P.S.Ashton) Byng & Christenh.
- Syzygium tawahense (Korth.) Merr. & L.M.Perry
- Syzygium tayabense (Quisumb. & Merr.) Merr.
- Syzygium taytayense (Merr.) Merr.
- Syzygium tchambaense J.W.Dawson
- Syzygium tectum (King) I.M.Turner
- Syzygium tekuense (M.R.Hend.) I.M.Turner
- Syzygium tenellum Blume ex Miq.
- Syzygium tenuicaudatum Merr. & L.M.Perry
- Syzygium tenuiflorum Brongn. & Gris
- Syzygium tenuifolium (Ridl.) Airy Shaw
- Syzygium tenuilimbum P.S.Ashton
- Syzygium tenuipes (Merr.) Merr.
- Syzygium tenuirame (Miq.) Merr.
- Syzygium tenuirhachis H.T.Chang & R.H.Miao
- Syzygium tephrodes (Hance) Merr. & L.M.Perry
- Syzygium teretiflorum (Koord. & Valeton) Amshoff
- Syzygium tesselatum Korth.
- Syzygium tetragonum (Wight) Wall. ex Walp.
- Syzygium tetrapleurum L.M.Perry
- Syzygium tetrapterum (Miq.) Chantar. & J.Parn.
- Syzygium thalassicum Merr. & L.M.Perry
- Syzygium thompsonii (Merr.) N.Snow
- Syzygium thomsenii (Diels) Merr. & L.M.Perry
- Syzygium thorelii (Gagnep.) Merr. & L.M.Perry
- Syzygium thornei T.G.Hartley & L.M.Perry
- Syzygium thouvenotii (Danguy) Byng
- Syzygium thumra (Roxb.) Mason
- Syzygium tierneyanum (F.Muell.) T.G.Hartley & L.M.Perry
- Syzygium timorianum Decne.
- Syzygium tinombalum Sunarti
- Syzygium tiumanense (Ridl.) I.M.Turner
- Syzygium toddalioides (Wight) Walp.
- Syzygium tolypanthum Diels
- Syzygium toninense (Baker f.) J.W.Dawson
- Syzygium tonkinense (Gagnep.) Merr. & L.M.Perry
- Syzygium tontoutaense J.W.Dawson
- Syzygium toppingii (Elmer) Merr.
- Syzygium torricellianum Diels
- Syzygium trachyanthum (Diels) Merr. & L.M.Perry
- Syzygium trachyphloium (C.T.White) B.Hyland
- Syzygium treubii Merr. & L.M.Perry
- Syzygium trianthum (Merr.) Merr.
- Syzygium trichotomum (Greves) Merr. & L.M.Perry
- Syzygium tricolor (Diels) Merr. & L.M.Perry
- Syzygium tringiense Byng & N.Snow
- Syzygium tripetalum Guillaumin
- Syzygium triphlebium Diels
- Syzygium triphyllum Merr.
- Syzygium tripinnatum (Blanco) Merr.
- Syzygium triplinervium Teijsm. & Binn.
- Syzygium triste (Kurz) N.P.Balakr.
- Syzygium trivene (Ridl.) Merr. & L.M.Perry
- Syzygium trukense (Hosok.) Costion & E.Lucas
- Syzygium tsoongii (Merr.) Merr. & L.M.Perry
- Syzygium tubiflorum P.S.Ashton
- Syzygium tula (Merr.) Merr.
- Syzygium turbinatum Alston
- Syzygium tympananthum (Diels) Merr. & L.M.Perry
- Syzygium ubogoense W.N.Takeuchi
- Syzygium ultramaficum P.S.Ashton
- Syzygium umbellatum Korth.
- Syzygium umbilicatum (Koord. & Valeton) Amshoff
- Syzygium umbrosum Thwaites
- Syzygium uniflorum Merr. & L.M.Perry
- Syzygium unipunctatum (B.Hyland) Craven & Biffin
- Syzygium urceolatum (Korth.) Merr. & L.M.Perry
- Syzygium urdanetense (Elmer) Merr.
- Syzygium urophyllum Merr.
- Syzygium utilis (Talbot) Rathakr. & N.C.Nair

== V-Z ==
- Syzygium vacciniifolium Merr.
- Syzygium valdecoriaceum P.S.Ashton
- Syzygium valdepunctatum Merr.
- Syzygium valdevenosum (Duthie) Merr. & L.M.Perry
- Syzygium valentissimum P.S.Ashton
- Syzygium valetonianum (King) Widodo
- Syzygium validinerve T.G.Hartley & L.M.Perry
- Syzygium validum Korth.
- Syzygium vanderwateri (Ridl.) Merr. & L.M.Perry
- Syzygium vanuatuense Tuiwawa & Craven
- Syzygium variabile T.G.Hartley & L.M.Perry
- Syzygium variifolium Miq.
- Syzygium variolosum (King) Chantar. & J.Parn.
- Syzygium vaughanii J.Guého & A.J.Scott
- Syzygium vaupelii Whistler
- Syzygium veal W.K.Soh, H.V.Sam & J.Parn.
- Syzygium veillonii J.W.Dawson
- Syzygium velarum B.Hyland
- Syzygium velutinum A.P.Davis
- Syzygium venosum DC.
- Syzygium venustum (Roxb.) Wight ex Mason
- Syzygium verniciflorum (Diels) Merr. & L.M.Perry
- Syzygium vernicosum Merr. & L.M.Perry
- Syzygium vernonioides (Elmer) Merr.
- Syzygium verrucosum Däniker
- Syzygium versteegii (Lauterb.) Merr. & L.M.Perry
- Syzygium verticillatum (C.Chen) G.Y.Li & Z.H.Chen
- Syzygium vestitum Merr. & L.M.Perry
- Syzygium viburnoides Diels
- Syzygium vidalianum (Elmer) Merr.
- Syzygium vieillardii N.Snow, Callm. & Byng
- Syzygium villamilii (Merr.) Merr. & L.M.Perry
- Syzygium villiferum (Ridl.) Masam.
- Syzygium virescens Merr. & L.M.Perry
- Syzygium viridescens (Ridl.) I.M.Turner
- Syzygium viriosum Craven & J.W.Dawson
- Syzygium virotii J.W.Dawson
- Syzygium vismioides (DC.) Govaerts
- Syzygium vrieseanum (Miq.) Amshoff
- Syzygium vulcanicum Elmer ex Merr.
- Syzygium wagapense Brongn. & Gris
- Syzygium waikaiunense T.G.Hartley & L.M.Perry
- Syzygium walkeri Merr. & L.M.Perry ex C.T.White
- Syzygium warburgii Merr. & L.M.Perry
- Syzygium waterhousei Merr. & L.M.Perry
- Syzygium watsonianum (M.R.Hend.) I.M.Turner
- Syzygium watutense Craven & N.Snow
- Syzygium wawoniense Sunarti & Rugayah
- Syzygium wenshanense H.T.Chang & R.H.Miao
- Syzygium wenzelii (Merr.) Merr.
- Syzygium wesa B.Hyland
- Syzygium whitfordii (Merr.) Merr.
- Syzygium whitmorei Craven & Damas
- Syzygium williamsii (C.B.Rob.) Merr.
- Syzygium wilsonii (F.Muell.) B.Hyland
- Syzygium winckelii Amshoff
- Syzygium winitii (Craib) Merr. & L.M.Perry
- Syzygium wolfii (Gillespie) Merr. & L.M.Perry
- Syzygium wollastonii (Ridl.) Merr. & L.M.Perry
- Syzygium womersleyi T.G.Hartley & L.M.Perry
- Syzygium wrayi (King) I.M.Turner
- Syzygium wrightii (Baker) A.J.Scott
- Syzygium xanthophyllum (C.B.Rob.) Merr.
- Syzygium xanthostemifolium (Guillaumin) J.W.Dawson
- Syzygium xerampelinum B.Hyland
- Syzygium xiphophyllum (Merr.) Merr.
- Syzygium xizangense H.T.Chang & R.H.Miao
- Syzygium xylopiaceum (Diels) Merr. & L.M.Perry
- Syzygium yersinii Tagane, V.S.Dang & Yahara
- Syzygium yunnanense Merr. & L.M.Perry
- Syzygium zamboangense (C.B.Rob.) Merr.
- Syzygium zeylanicum (L.) DC.
- Syzygium zhenghei Craven & Biffin
- Syzygium zimmermannii (Warb. ex Craib) Merr. & L.M.Perry
- Syzygium zollingerianum (Miq.) Amshoff
