= Syzygium rhomboideum =

Conservation status
- Vulnerable (IUCN 2.3)

Scientific classification
- Kingdom: Plantae
- Clade: Tracheophytes
- Clade: Angiosperms
- Clade: Eudicots
- Clade: Rosids
- Order: Myrtales
- Family: Myrtaceae
- Genus: Syzygium
- Species: S. rhomboideum

Binomial name
- Syzygium rhomboideum (Ridl.) I.M.Turner

Synonyms
- Eugenia rhomboidea Ridl.

Species of tree

Syzygium rhomboideum is a species of flowering plant in the family Myrtaceae. It is a tree endemic to Peninsular Malaysia. It is known from a single collection in on Gunung Mengkueng in Selangor, where it grows in montane rain forest at 1,300 metres elevation.

The species was first described as Eugenia rhomboidea by Henry Nicholas Ridley in 1914. In 1997 Ian Mark Turner placed the species in genus Syzygium as S. rhomboideum.
