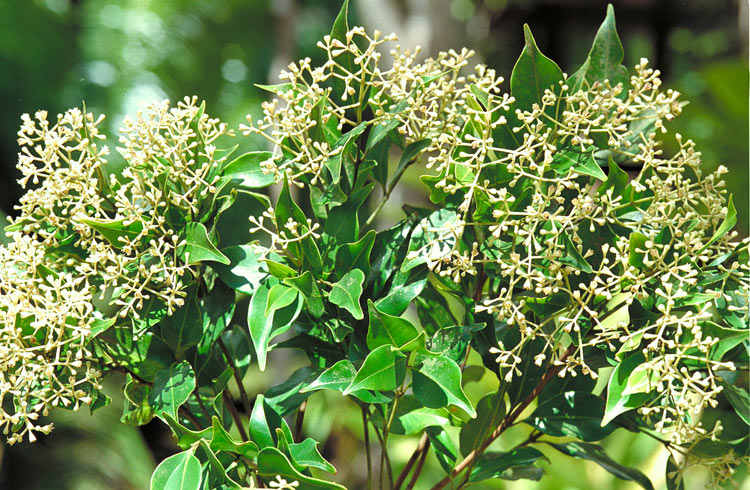

Scientific classification
- Kingdom: Plantae
- Clade: Tracheophytes
- Clade: Angiosperms
- Clade: Eudicots
- Clade: Rosids
- Order: Myrtales
- Family: Myrtaceae
- Genus: Syzygium
- Species: S. wesa

Binomial name
- Syzygium wesa B.Hyland

= Syzygium wesa =

Species of tree

Syzygium wesa, commonly known as white Eungella gum, is a tree in the Myrtaceae family, native to Queensland.
