= Syzygium guehoi =

Conservation status
- Critically Endangered (IUCN 2.3)

Scientific classification
- Kingdom: Plantae
- Clade: Tracheophytes
- Clade: Angiosperms
- Clade: Eudicots
- Clade: Rosids
- Order: Myrtales
- Family: Myrtaceae
- Genus: Syzygium
- Species: S. guehoi

Binomial name
- Syzygium guehoi Bosser & Florens

Species of flowering plant

Syzygium guehoi is a species of plant in the family Myrtaceae. It is endemic to Mauritius. Its natural habitat is rocky areas.
