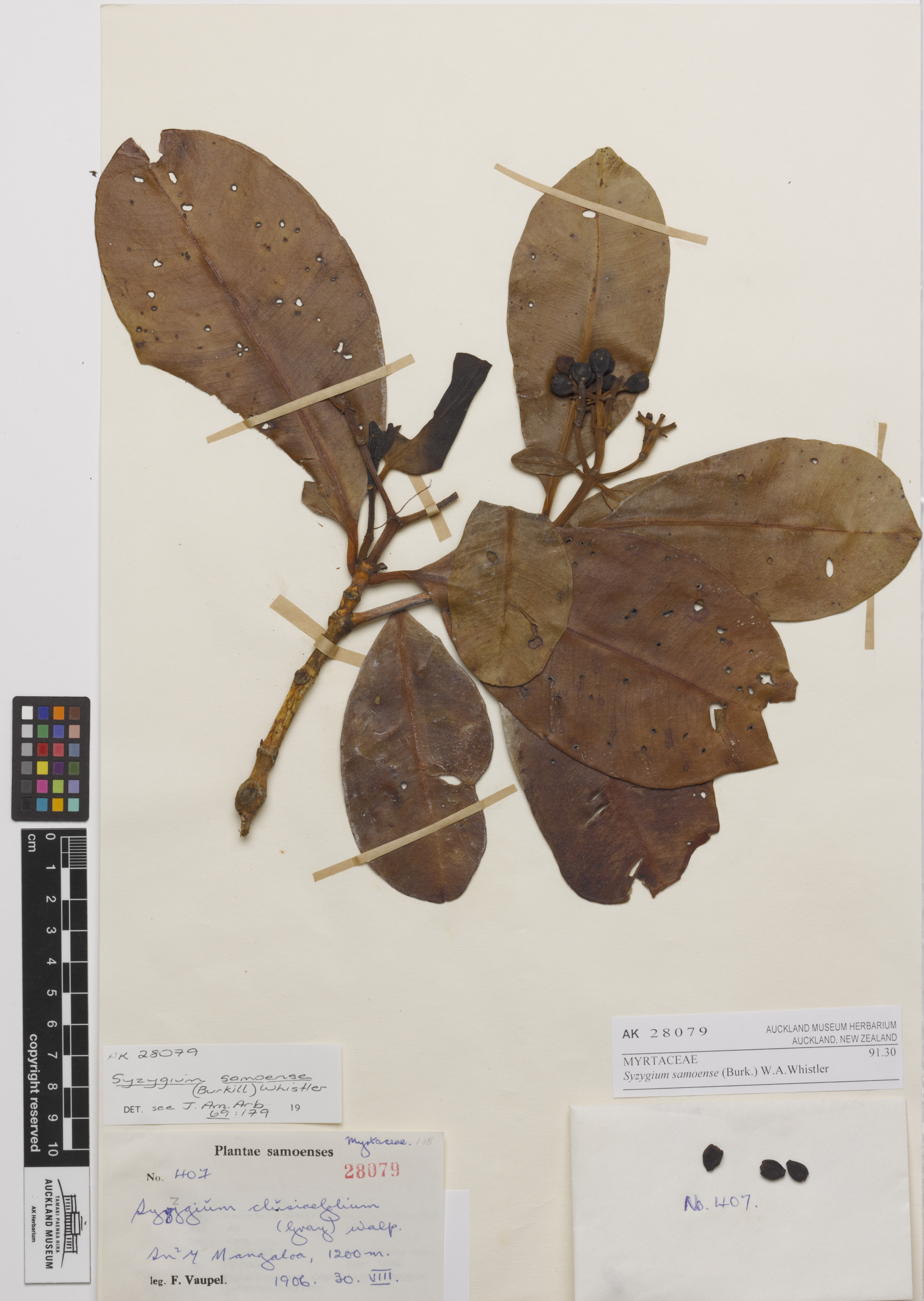
- Syzygium samoense

Scientific classification
- Kingdom: Plantae
- Clade: Embryophytes
- Clade: Tracheophytes
- Clade: Spermatophytes
- Clade: Angiosperms
- Clade: Eudicots
- Clade: Rosids
- Order: Myrtales
- Family: Myrtaceae
- Genus: Syzygium
- Species: S. samoense

Binomial name
- Syzygium samoense (Burkill) Whistler (1978)

Synonyms
- Eugenia samoensis Burkill (1901)

= Syzygium samoense =

Species of flowering plant

Syzygium samoense is a species of flowering plant in the myrtle family, Myrtaceae. It is a tree native to the Samoan Islands and Wallis and Futuna.

Syzygium samoense is an evergreen tree growing up to 17 meter tall. It flowers in June and July, and fruits in February and July to September and possibly year-round. It grows in lowland and cloud forests on all the main Samoan islands from 100 to 1200 meters elevation.
