= Syzygium dyerianum =

Conservation status
- Least Concern (IUCN 2.3)

Scientific classification
- Kingdom: Plantae
- Clade: Tracheophytes
- Clade: Angiosperms
- Clade: Eudicots
- Clade: Rosids
- Order: Myrtales
- Family: Myrtaceae
- Genus: Syzygium
- Species: S. dyerianum

Binomial name
- Syzygium dyerianum (King) Chantar. & J.Parn.

Synonyms
- Eugenia atronervia M.R.Hend.; Eugenia clarkeana King; Eugenia corrugata King; Eugenia dyeriana King; Eugenia dyeriana var. oblonga King

Species of flowering plant

Syzygium dyerianum is a species of flowering plant in the family Myrtaceae. It is a tree native to southwestern and southern Myanmar, Thailand, and Peninsular Malaysia. It grows in lowland and montane tropical moist forests.

The species was first described as Eugenia dyeriana by George King in 1901. In 1993 Pranom Chantaranothai and John Adrian Naicker Parnell placed the species in genus Syzygium as S. dyerianum.
