= Syzygium tiumanense =

Conservation status
- Vulnerable (IUCN 2.3)

Scientific classification
- Kingdom: Plantae
- Clade: Tracheophytes
- Clade: Angiosperms
- Clade: Eudicots
- Clade: Rosids
- Order: Myrtales
- Family: Myrtaceae
- Genus: Syzygium
- Species: S. tiumanense

Binomial name
- Syzygium tiumanense (Ridl.) I.M.Turner

Synonyms
- Eugenia tiumanensis Ridl.

Species of tree

Syzygium tiumanense is a species of flowering plant in the family Myrtaceae. It is a tree endemic to Pulau Tioman in Peninsular Malaysia. The species is threatened by the rapid development of the island into a tourist resort.

The species was first described as Eugenia tiumanensis by Henry Nicholas Ridley in 1893. In 1997 Ian Mark Turner placed the species in genus Syzygium as S. tiumanense.
