= Syzygium millsii =

Conservation status
- Near Threatened (IUCN 2.3)

Scientific classification
- Kingdom: Plantae
- Clade: Tracheophytes
- Clade: Angiosperms
- Clade: Eudicots
- Clade: Rosids
- Order: Myrtales
- Family: Myrtaceae
- Genus: Syzygium
- Species: S. millsii

Binomial name
- Syzygium millsii (M.R.Hend.) I.M.Turner

Synonyms
- Eugenia millsii M.R.Hend.

Species of tree

Syzygium millsii is a species of flowering plant in the family Myrtaceae. It is a tree endemic to Peninsular Malaysia and is threatened by habitat loss.
