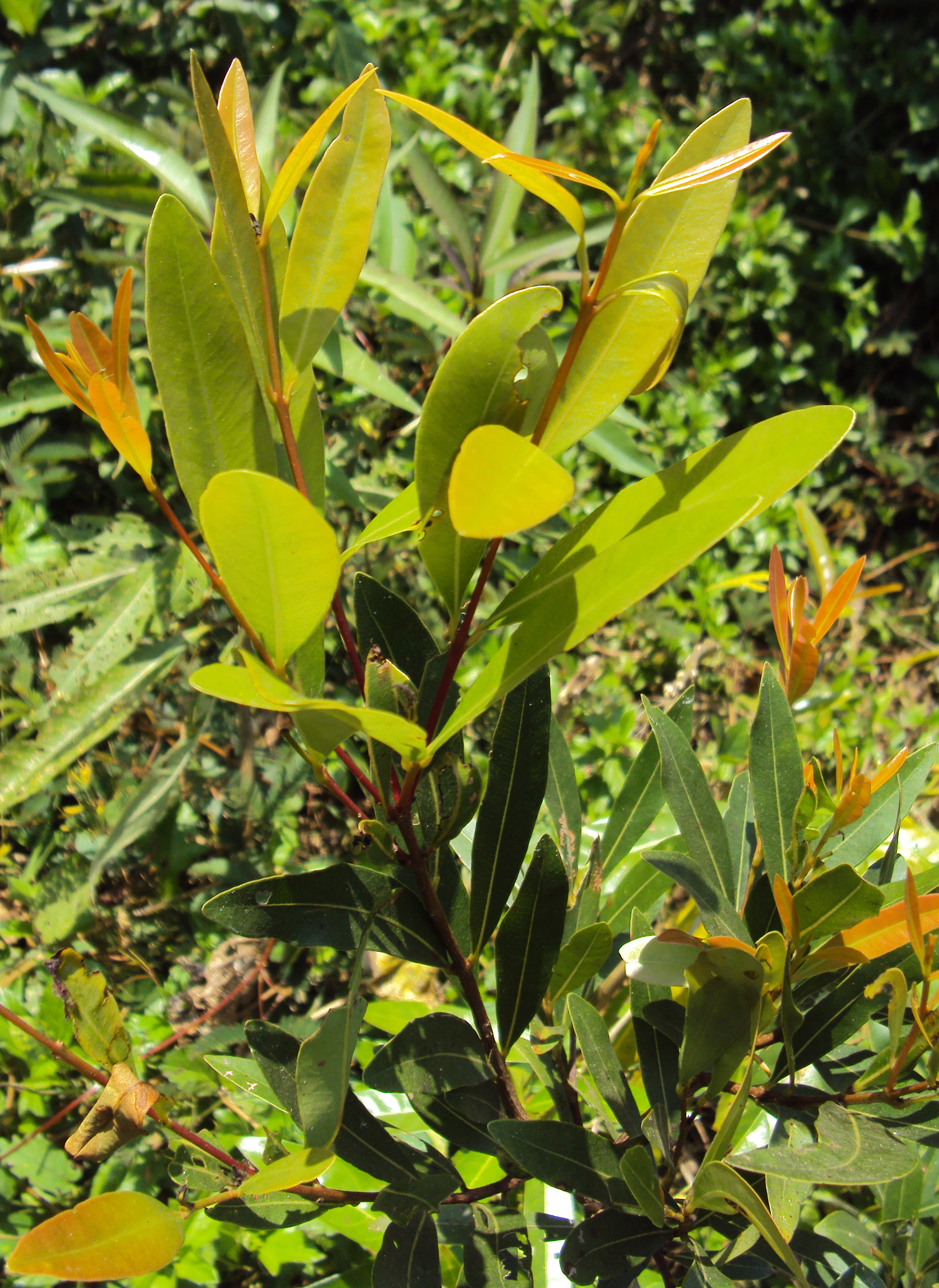

Conservation status
- Least Concern (IUCN 3.1)

Scientific classification
- Kingdom: Plantae
- Clade: Tracheophytes
- Clade: Angiosperms
- Clade: Eudicots
- Clade: Rosids
- Order: Myrtales
- Family: Myrtaceae
- Genus: Syzygium
- Species: S. salicifolium

Binomial name
- Syzygium salicifolium J.Graham

Synonyms
- Calyptranthes danca Buch.-Ham. ex Wall., nom. nud.; Eugenia heyneana Duthie; Eugenia heyneana var. alternans Duthie; Eugenia salicifolia (J.Graham) Wight, nom. illeg. homonym. post.; Syzygium alternans Miq. ex Duthie; Syzygium heyneanum (Duthie) Gamble, nom. superfl.; Syzygium heyneanum var. alternans (Duthie) B.G.Kulk. & Lakshmin.

= Syzygium salicifolium =

Species of flowering plant

Syzygium salicifolium is a species of the genus Syzygium of the flowering plant family Myrtaceae. commonly called "Vellamanchi" in Malayalam. It is a shrub or tree commonly seen in evergreen forests. It is native to the Western Ghats, and to Uttarakhand in the western Himalayas.

== Description ==
Syzygium salicifolium is a small tree, up to 6 m tall. Its flowering and fruiting season is from April to May, and its flowers are white.

== Gallery ==
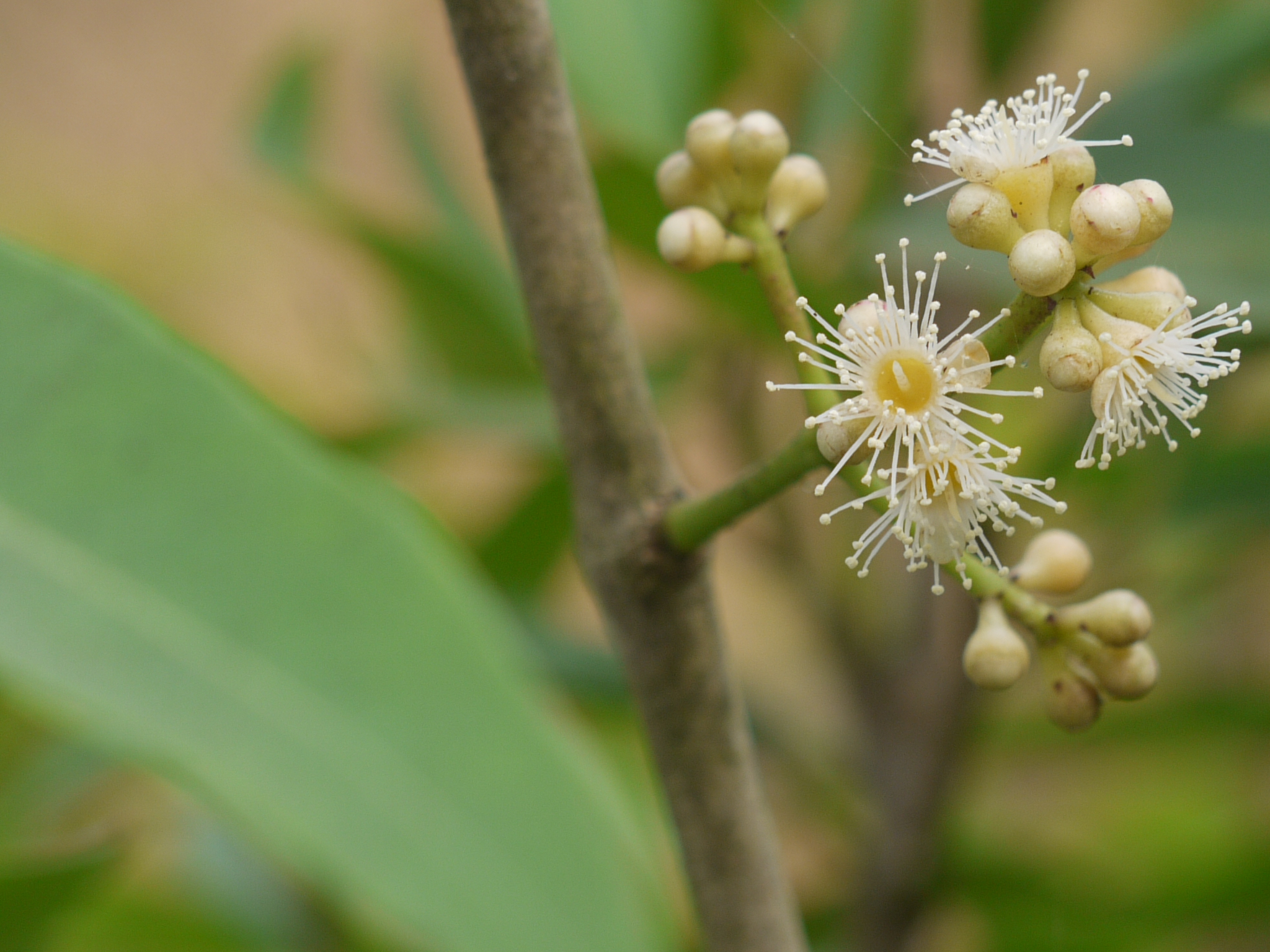

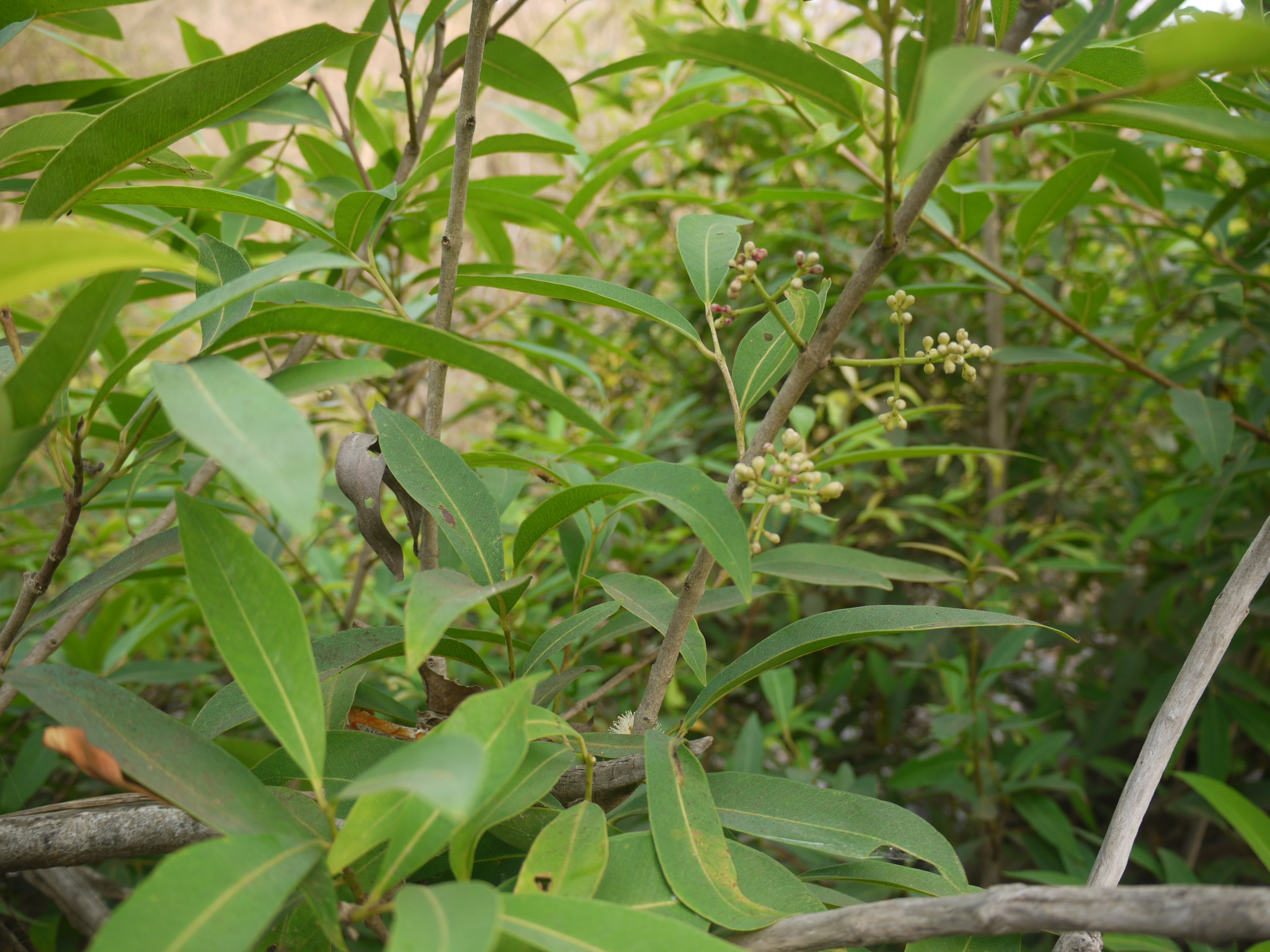

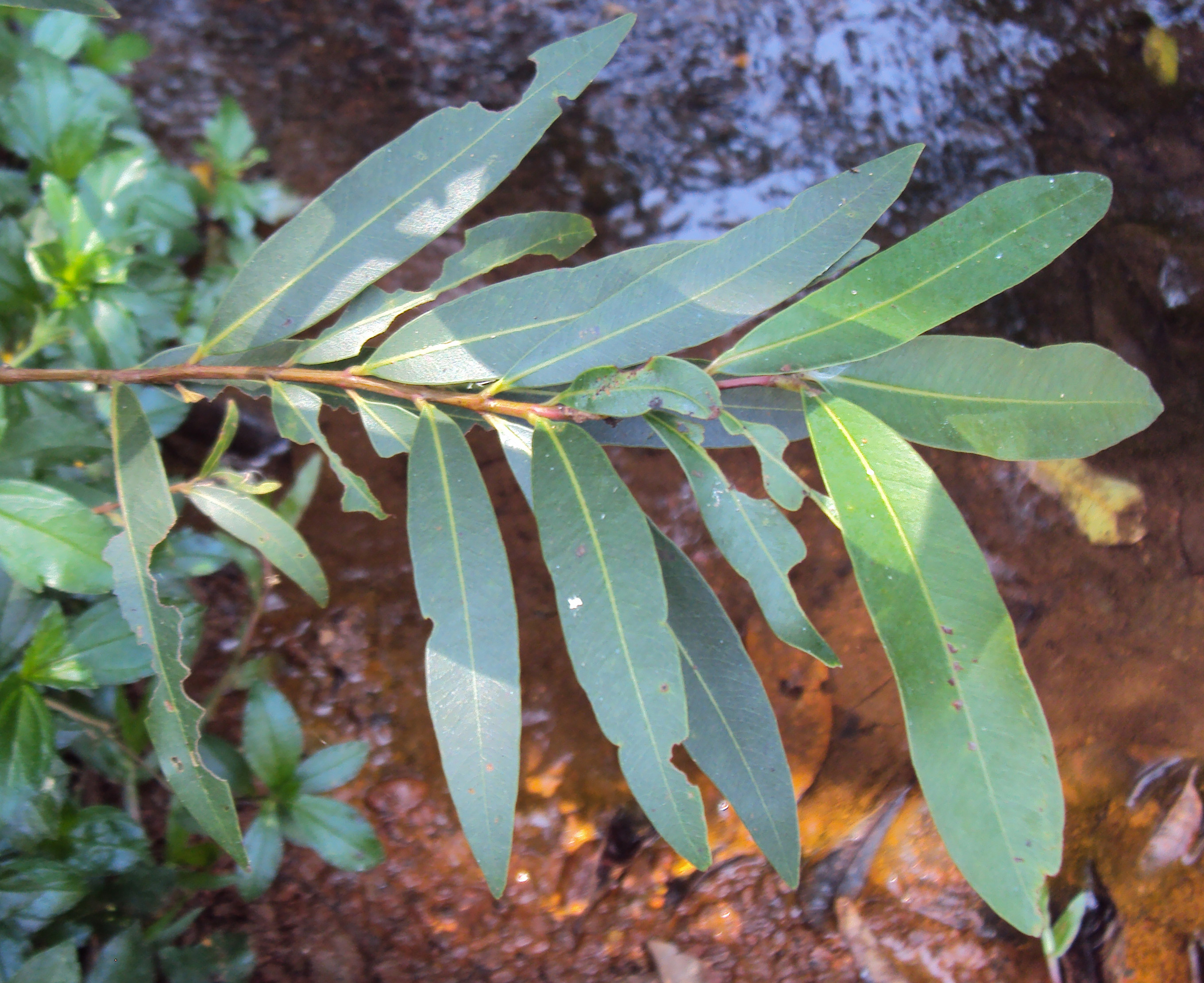

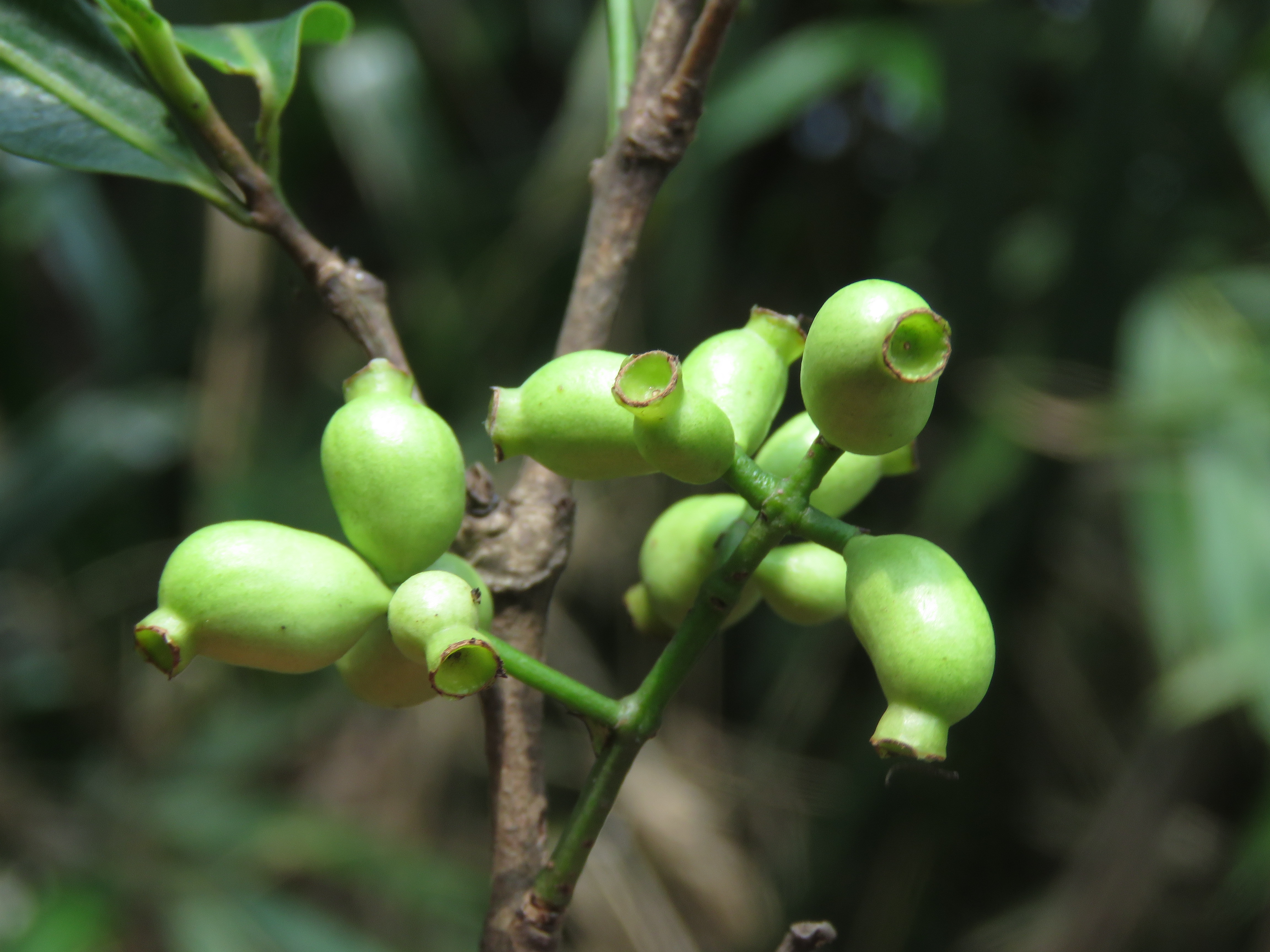

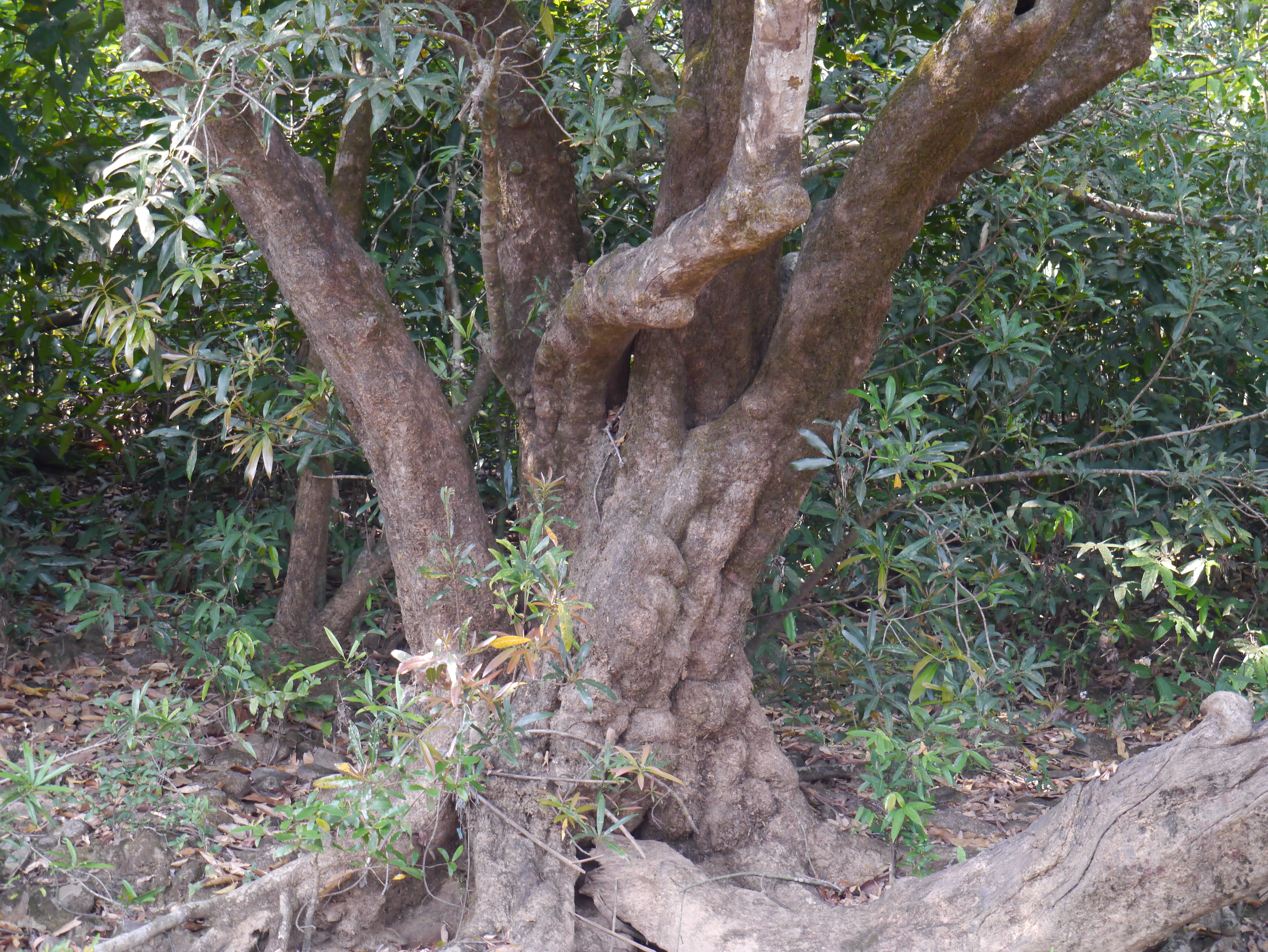

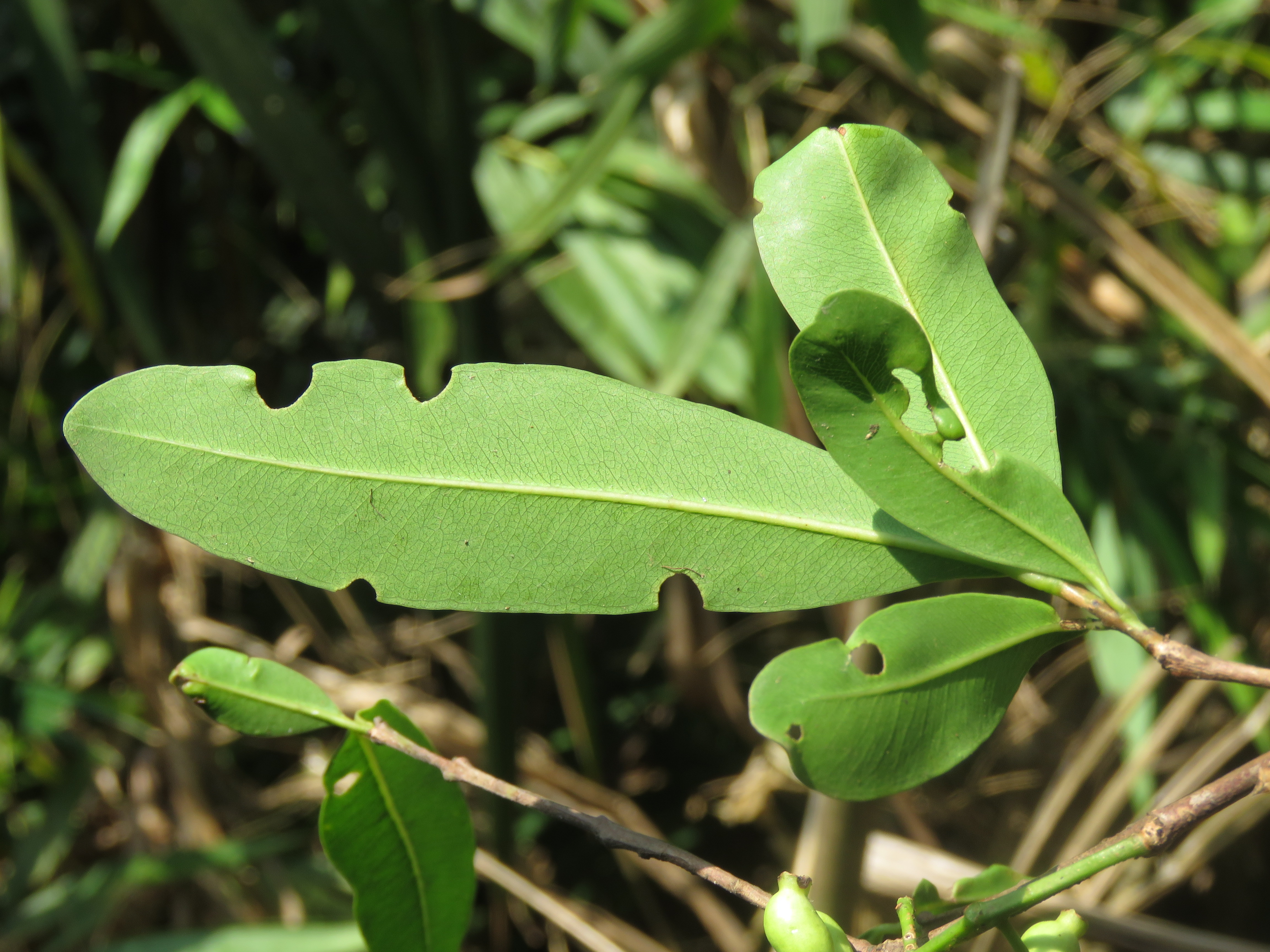
