= Syzygium brevifolium =

Scientific classification
- Kingdom: Plantae
- Clade: Tracheophytes
- Clade: Angiosperms
- Clade: Eudicots
- Clade: Rosids
- Order: Myrtales
- Family: Myrtaceae
- Genus: Syzygium
- Species: S. brevifolium

Binomial name
- Syzygium brevifolium (A.Gray) Müll.Berol. (1858)

Synonyms
- Eugenia brevifolia A.Gray (1854); Eugenia oreophila Rech. (1910), nom. illeg.

Species of flowering plant

Syzygium brevifolium is a species of flowering plant in the myrtle family, Myrtaceae. It is a tree endemic to the Samoan Islands.
