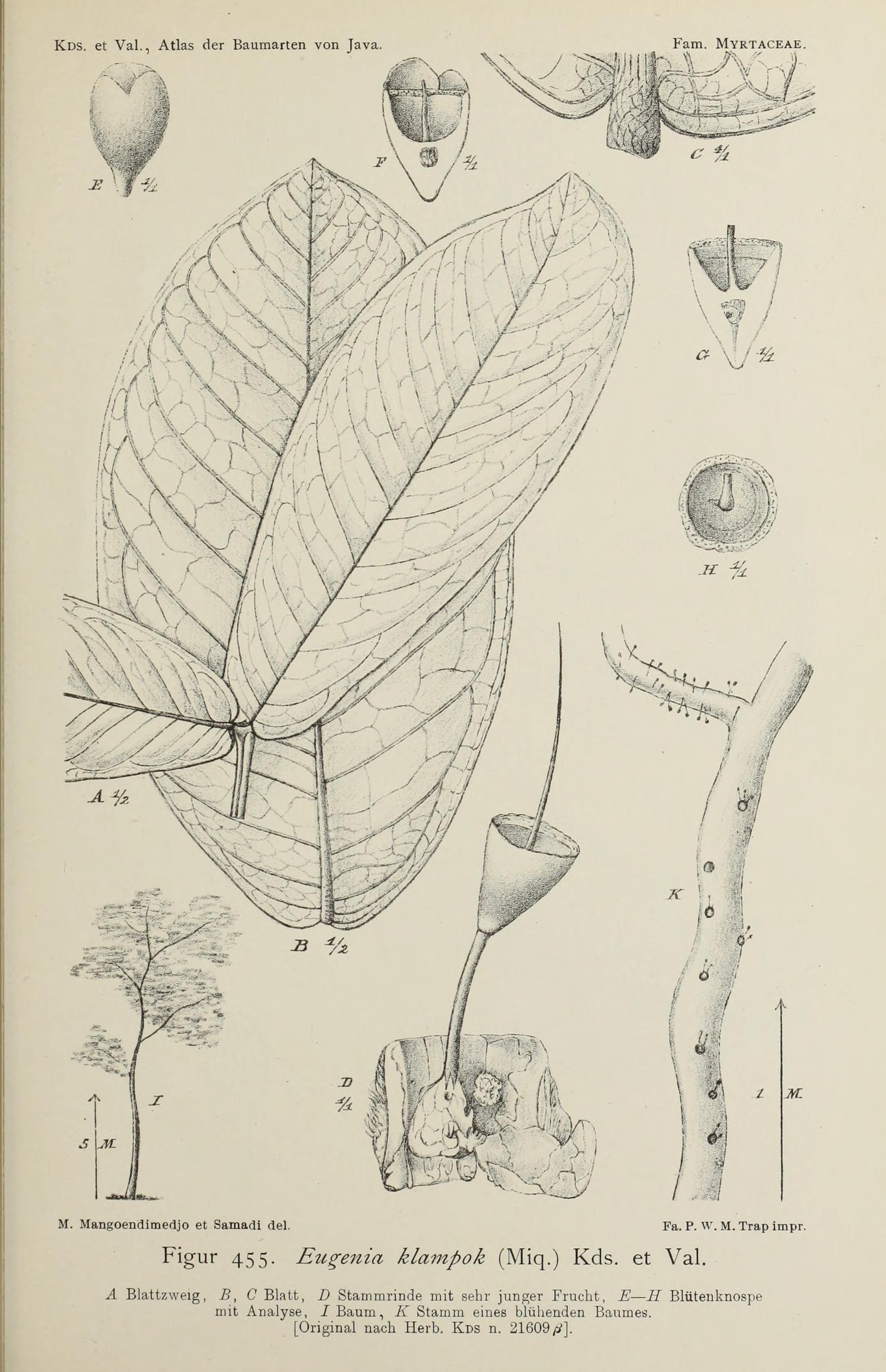
- Botanical illustration

Conservation status
- Endangered (IUCN 3.1)

Scientific classification
- Kingdom: Plantae
- Clade: Tracheophytes
- Clade: Angiosperms
- Clade: Eudicots
- Clade: Rosids
- Order: Myrtales
- Family: Myrtaceae
- Genus: Syzygium
- Species: S. klampok

Binomial name
- Syzygium klampok (Miq.) Amshoff

Synonyms
- Eugenia klampok (Miq.) Koord. & Valeton; Jambosa glabra Zoll. ex Koord. & Valeton; Jambosa klampok Miq.

= Syzygium klampok =

Species of plant in the myrtle family

Syzygium klampok, the klampok, is a species of flowering plant in the family Myrtaceae. It is endemic to Java, Indonesia, where it is endangered. Due to its association with springs, it is considered a sacred tree.

== Conservation ==
Syzygium klampok has been assessed as endangered on the IUCN Red List. It faces numerous threats in its eastern Java habitat including continuing deforestation for agriculture, for palm oil and other plantations, and for urban development. The species is not present in any protected areas.
