= Syzygium nidie =

Conservation status
- Least Concern (IUCN 3.1)

Scientific classification
- Kingdom: Plantae
- Clade: Tracheophytes
- Clade: Angiosperms
- Clade: Eudicots
- Clade: Rosids
- Order: Myrtales
- Family: Myrtaceae
- Genus: Syzygium
- Species: S. nidie

Binomial name
- Syzygium nidie Guillaumin

Species of plant

Syzygium nidie is a species of flowering plant in the family Myrtaceae, native to Vanuatu and Fiji. A hardwood tree reaching 15 m (50 ft), it is harvested commercially for its timber.
