= Syzygium arenitense =

Scientific classification
- Kingdom: Plantae
- Clade: Tracheophytes
- Clade: Angiosperms
- Clade: Eudicots
- Clade: Rosids
- Order: Myrtales
- Family: Myrtaceae
- Genus: Syzygium
- Species: S. arenitense

Binomial name
- Syzygium arenitense Craven

Species of flowering plant

Syzygium arenitense is a species of shrub or tree in the family Myrtaceae. It is found in Australia.

== Description ==
Syzygium arenitense is a shrub or small tree that can grow to as much as 12 metres (39 ft) in height. It has smooth bark that is grey to grey-white. Its leaves are hairless and 3.6–8.2 cm long and 2.3 to 9.1 times as long as they are wide. Their shape is elliptic to obovate, having sides that are elliptic or shaped like a teardrop with the narrowest part at the base, and can be quite narrow. The edges of the leaves are flat and smooth.

== Distribution ==
It is found primarily in the Northern Territory with isolated populations in the Kimberley of Western Australia.
