= Syzygium pauper =

Conservation status
- Least Concern (IUCN 2.3)

Scientific classification
- Kingdom: Plantae
- Clade: Tracheophytes
- Clade: Angiosperms
- Clade: Eudicots
- Clade: Rosids
- Order: Myrtales
- Family: Myrtaceae
- Genus: Syzygium
- Species: S. pauper

Binomial name
- Syzygium pauper (Ridl.) I.M.Turner

Synonyms
- Eugenia pauper Ridl.

Species of flowering plant

Syzygium pauper is a species of plant in the family Myrtaceae. It is found in Malaysia and Singapore.
