= Syzygium amplum =

Conservation status
- Least Concern (IUCN 3.1)

Scientific classification
- Kingdom: Plantae
- Clade: Tracheophytes
- Clade: Angiosperms
- Clade: Eudicots
- Clade: Rosids
- Order: Myrtales
- Family: Myrtaceae
- Genus: Syzygium
- Species: S. amplum

Binomial name
- Syzygium amplum T.G.Hartley & L.M.Perry

Species of flowering plant

Syzygium amplum, is a species of flowering plant in the family Myrtaceae. It is a tree native to the islands of New Guinea and New Britain, and to northern Queensland in Australia. It grows in lowland and lower montane rain forests up to 1,500 metres elevation.

== Description ==
It is a small sub-canopy tree which can grow up to 20 metres tall, though it usually reaches a maximum height of 15 metres.
