= Syzygium endophloium =

Conservation status
- Least Concern (NCA)

Scientific classification
- Kingdom: Plantae
- Clade: Tracheophytes
- Clade: Angiosperms
- Clade: Eudicots
- Clade: Rosids
- Order: Myrtales
- Family: Myrtaceae
- Genus: Syzygium
- Species: S. endophloium

Binomial name
- Syzygium endophloium B.Hyland, 1983

Species of flowering plant

Syzygium endophloium, known commonly as the watergum, is a species of flowering plant in the family Myrtaceae that is endemic to Queensland in Australia.

== Habitat & distribution ==
The species can be found in tropical lowland and montane rainforest in northern and central Queensland, with the bulk of its diversity being in the Wet Tropics.

== Description ==
This species grows as a tree to a height of 40 metres. The species has a perennial life cycle and is hermaphroditic. The flowering time of this species is from September to December and the fruiting time is from September to February. The fruit is fleshy, indehiscent, baccate and/or drupaceous. The leaves are 90 millimetres long and 40 millimetres wide. The species is evergreen.

== Conservation ==
Under the Nature Conservation Act 1992 in Queensland it has been classified as Least Concern.
