= Syzygium cameronum =

Conservation status
- Vulnerable (IUCN 2.3)

Scientific classification
- Kingdom: Plantae
- Clade: Tracheophytes
- Clade: Angiosperms
- Clade: Eudicots
- Clade: Rosids
- Order: Myrtales
- Family: Myrtaceae
- Genus: Syzygium
- Species: S. cameronum

Binomial name
- Syzygium cameronum I.M.Turner

Synonyms
- Eugenia goniocalyx Ridl.

Species of flowering plant

Syzygium cameronum, formerly known as Eugenia goniocalyx, is a species of flowering plant in the family Myrtaceae. It is a tree endemic to Peninsular Malaysia, where it is known only from Pahang. It grows in montane rain forest at about 1,500 metres elevation. It is threatened by habitat loss.
