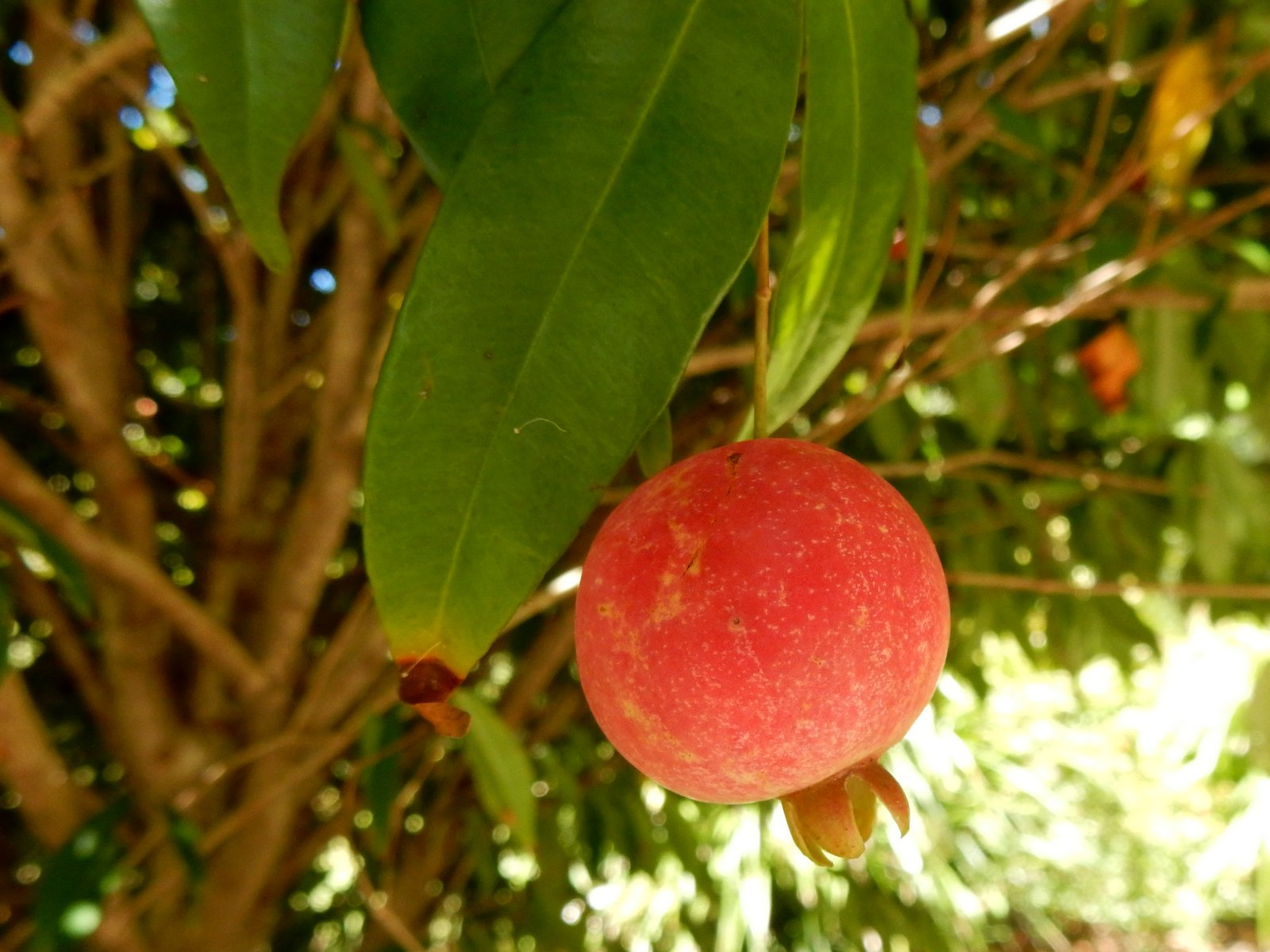

Scientific classification
- Kingdom: Plantae
- Clade: Tracheophytes
- Clade: Angiosperms
- Clade: Eudicots
- Clade: Rosids
- Order: Myrtales
- Family: Myrtaceae
- Genus: Syzygium
- Species: S. boonjee

Binomial name
- Syzygium boonjee B.Hyland

= Syzygium boonjee =

Boonjee satinash

Species of tree

Syzygium boonjee, known as the Boonjee satinash, is a rainforest plant of tropical Queensland, Australia. Found between Gordonvale and Tully. Usually a shrub, it may reach 8 metres tall.
