= Syzygium simile =

Conservation status
- Near Threatened (IUCN 3.1)

Scientific classification
- Kingdom: Plantae
- Clade: Tracheophytes
- Clade: Angiosperms
- Clade: Eudicots
- Clade: Rosids
- Order: Myrtales
- Family: Myrtaceae
- Genus: Syzygium
- Species: S. simile

Binomial name
- Syzygium simile (Merr.) Merr.

Synonyms
- Eugenia similis Merr.; Calyptranthes ramiflora Blanco; Syzygium lanyuense C.E.Chang; Syzygium latifolium Blanco

Species of flowering plant

Syzygium simile, also known as arang, is a species of plant in the family Myrtaceae. It is an evergreen tree native to Taiwan and the Philippines, where it grows near water.

== Description ==
The height of S. simile ranges between 7 and 15 m (23 and 49 ft). Its pulp is edible. It has pink-white flowers that grow in small clusters with 4-5 petals and nearly-spherical berries that are dark purple.

== Distribution and habitats ==
Syzygium simile prefers wet, tropical areas and commonly grows along rivers or stream banks in thickets. It typically grows at an elevation between 40 and 500 m (130 and 1,640 ft) above sea level.

== Uses ==
It is commonly logged and used for building ships and houses.
