= Syzygium jasminifolium =

Conservation status
- Least Concern (IUCN 3.1)

Scientific classification
- Kingdom: Plantae
- Clade: Tracheophytes
- Clade: Angiosperms
- Clade: Eudicots
- Clade: Rosids
- Order: Myrtales
- Family: Myrtaceae
- Genus: Syzygium
- Species: S. jasminifolium

Binomial name
- Syzygium jasminifolium (Ridl.) Chantar. & J.Parn.

Synonyms
- Eugenia jasminifolia Ridl.

Species of tree

Syzygium jasminifolium is a species of flowering plant in the family Myrtaceae. It is a tree native to Peninsular Malaysia and Peninsular Thailand.
