= Syzygium tenuifolium =

Conservation status
- Endangered (IUCN 2.3)

Scientific classification
- Kingdom: Plantae
- Clade: Tracheophytes
- Clade: Angiosperms
- Clade: Eudicots
- Clade: Rosids
- Order: Myrtales
- Family: Myrtaceae
- Genus: Syzygium
- Species: S. tenuifolium

Binomial name
- Syzygium tenuifolium (Ridl.) Airy Shaw

Synonyms
- Aphanomyrtus tenuifiolia (Ridl.) Merr.; Pseudoeugenia tenuifolia Ridl.

Species of tree

Syzygium tenuifolium is a species of plant in the family Myrtaceae. It is a tree endemic to Peninsular Malaysia. Under the synonym Pseudoeugenia tenuifolia, it was classed as endangered and threatened by habitat loss.
