= Syzygium rugosum =

Conservation status
- Least Concern (IUCN 3.1)

Scientific classification
- Kingdom: Plantae
- Clade: Tracheophytes
- Clade: Angiosperms
- Clade: Eudicots
- Clade: Rosids
- Order: Myrtales
- Family: Myrtaceae
- Genus: Syzygium
- Species: S. rugosum

Binomial name
- Syzygium rugosum Korth.

Synonyms
- Eugenia johorensis Ridl.; Eugenia motleyi Ridl.; Eugenia rugosa (Korth.) Merr.; Eugenia rugosa var. saxitana (Ridl.) M.R.Hend.; Eugenia saxitana Ridl.; Syzygium johorense Masam.; Syzygium motleyi (Ridl.) Masam.

Species of tree

Syzygium rugosum is a species of flowering plant in the family Myrtaceae. It is a tree native to Peninsular Malaysia, Borneo, and Java. It is threatened by habitat loss.
