= Syzygium quadrangulatum =

Conservation status
- Least Concern (IUCN 3.1)

Scientific classification
- Kingdom: Plantae
- Clade: Tracheophytes
- Clade: Angiosperms
- Clade: Eudicots
- Clade: Rosids
- Order: Myrtales
- Family: Myrtaceae
- Genus: Syzygium
- Species: S. quadrangulatum

Binomial name
- Syzygium quadrangulatum (A.Gray) Merr. & L.M.Perry (1942)

Synonyms
- Eugenia quadrangulata A.Gray (1854); Jambosa quadrangulata (A.Gray) Müll.Berol. (1858)

Species of flowering plant

Syzygium quadrangulatum is a species of flowering plant in the myrtle family, Myrtaceae. It is a tree native to Fiji and Tonga. It grows up to 20 metres tall in dense or open moist forests and forest edges, sometimes along stream banks and sometimes in fairly open areas, up to 900 metres elevation.

The species was first described as Eugenia quadrangulata by Asa Gray in 1854. In 1942 Elmer Drew Merrill and Lily May Perry placed the species in genus Syzygium as S. quadrangulatum.
