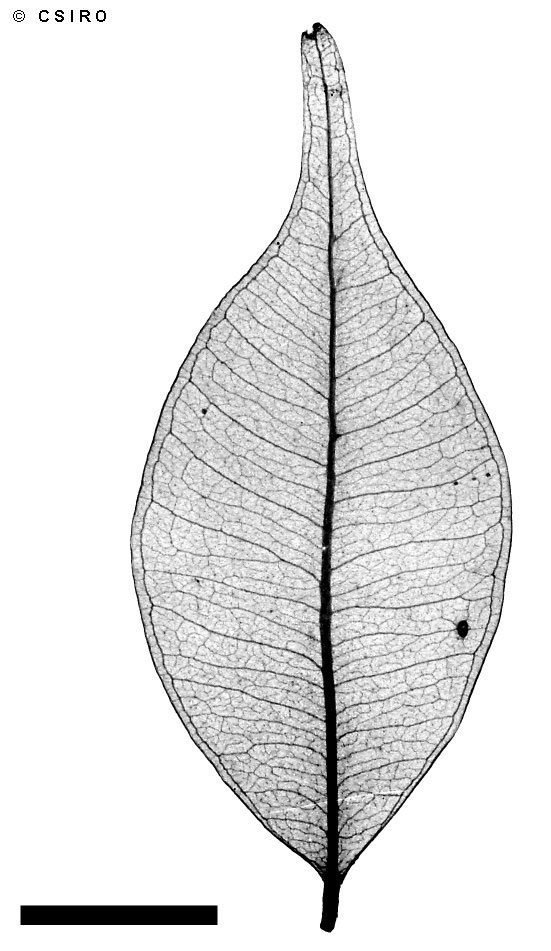
- Leaf x-ray

Conservation status
- Critically Endangered (NCA)

Scientific classification
- Kingdom: Plantae
- Clade: Tracheophytes
- Clade: Angiosperms
- Clade: Eudicots
- Clade: Rosids
- Order: Myrtales
- Family: Myrtaceae
- Genus: Syzygium
- Species: S. fratris

Binomial name
- Syzygium fratris Craven

= Syzygium fratris =

Brotherly love lilly pilly

Species of flowering plant

Syzygium fratris, also known as brotherly love lilly pilly, is a species of plants in the clove family Myrtaceae endemic to Queensland, Australia. Its natural range is restricted to a single mountain peak, and it has been classified as critically endangered. It was first described in 2003.

== Description ==
This is a small tree to 10 m (33 ft) tall and a trunk up to 10 cm (3.9 in) diameter. The leaves are elliptic to ovate with an extended drip tip. They are arranged in opposite pairs on the twigs and measure up to 8.5 cm (3.3 in) long by 3.4 cm (1.3 in) wide. There are about 10 to 14 lateral veins either side of the midrib, and an intramarginal vein runs along the length of the leaf blade about 1 mm (0.04 in) inside the margin. The inflorescence is short and produced at the end of the twigs. Flowers are about 5 mm (0.20 in) diameter with 4 sepals and 4 petals; they have more than 30 stamens up to 4 mm (0.16 in) long and a style about 5 mm (0.20 in) long. The ovary usually has 2 locules, each with 2–3 ovules.

== Taxonomy ==
This species was first described by Australian botanist Lyndley Alan Craven in 2003. The species epithet fratris is from the Latin word frater (brother), as a reference to the name of the mountain on which the species occurs.

== Distribution and habitat ==
The natural range of this species is very small, with an area of occupancy of just 16 km^{2} (6.2 sq mi). (Note: For a definition of Area of Occupancy see this page at the Atlas of Living Australia) It is entirely restricted to the top of Mount Bartle Frere at altitudes between 1,400 and 1,500 m (4,600 and 4,900 ft), where it grows in stunted windswept forest.

== Conservation ==
This species is listed as critically endangered under the Queensland Government's Nature Conservation Act. As of 9 January 2025, it has not been assessed by the International Union for Conservation of Nature (IUCN).
