= Syzygium amicorum =

Conservation status
- Least Concern (IUCN 3.1)

Scientific classification
- Kingdom: Plantae
- Clade: Tracheophytes
- Clade: Angiosperms
- Clade: Eudicots
- Clade: Rosids
- Order: Myrtales
- Family: Myrtaceae
- Genus: Syzygium
- Species: S. amicorum

Binomial name
- Syzygium amicorum (A.Gray) Müll.Berol.

Synonyms
- Eugenia amicorum A.Gray

Species of flowering plant

Syzygium amicorum is a species of flowering plant in the myrtle family, Myrtaceae. It is a shrub or tree endemic to Fiji.
