= Syzygium xanthophyllum =

- Preserved specimen

Conservation status
- Least Concern (IUCN 3.1)

Scientific classification
- Kingdom: Plantae
- Clade: Tracheophytes
- Clade: Angiosperms
- Clade: Eudicots
- Clade: Rosids
- Order: Myrtales
- Family: Myrtaceae
- Genus: Syzygium
- Species: S. xanthophyllum

Binomial name
- Syzygium xanthophyllum (C.B.Rob.) Merr.

Synonyms
- Eugenia xanthophylla C.B.Rob.

Species of flowering plant

Syzygium xanthophyllum, also known as bislot, malatampoi, lapinig, or barakbak, is a species of plant in the family Myrtaceae. It is a tree native to the forests of the Philippines.

== Description ==
Syzygium xanthophyllum can grow up to 20 m (65 ft) tall, and the diameter of its trunk can be up to 50 cm (20 in). The bark is smooth and grey, and it has white flowers that grow in clusters. Its fruits are spherical red berries, growing to 2-3 cm diameter in size, and are edible.

== Distribution and habitat ==
Syzygium xanthophyllum grows in wet, tropical forests around 300 m (980 ft) above sea level.

== Uses ==
The wood is used as timber to build things including ships, homes, and furniture. Due to the tannins the bark can yield, it can also be used to strengthen fishing nets or as a dye. It can be used as firewood or to make charcoal.
