= Syzygium dansiei =

Conservation status
- Least Concern (NCA)

Scientific classification
- Kingdom: Plantae
- Clade: Tracheophytes
- Clade: Angiosperms
- Clade: Eudicots
- Clade: Rosids
- Order: Myrtales
- Family: Myrtaceae
- Genus: Syzygium
- Species: S. dansiei

Binomial name
- Syzygium dansiei B.Hyland, 1983

Species of flowering plant

Syzygium dansiei is a species of flowering plant in the family Myrtaceae that is endemic to Queensland in Australia.

== Habitat & Distribution ==
The species is restricted to the Daintree Rainforest and Atherton Tablelands of the Wet Tropics in North Queensland.

== Description ==
This species grows as a tree to a height of 30 metres. The species has a perennial life cycle and is hermaphroditic. The flowering time of this species is in November and December and the fruiting time is from January to April. The fruit is fleshy, indehiscent, baccate or drupaceous. The species is evergreen.

== Conservation ==
Under the Nature Conservation Act 1992 in Queensland it has been classified as Least Concern.
