= Syzygium singaporense =

Conservation status
- Least Concern (IUCN 2.3)

Scientific classification
- Kingdom: Plantae
- Clade: Tracheophytes
- Clade: Angiosperms
- Clade: Eudicots
- Clade: Rosids
- Order: Myrtales
- Family: Myrtaceae
- Genus: Syzygium
- Species: S. singaporense

Binomial name
- Syzygium singaporense (King) Airy Shaw

Synonyms
- Aphanomyrtus rostrata Miq.; Myrtus caudata Wall.; Pseudoeugenia singaporensis King

Species of plant

Syzygium singaporense (synonym Pseudoeugenia singaporensis) is a species of flowering plant in the family Myrtaceae. It is found in Peninsular Malaysia.
