= Syzygium abatakum =

Conservation status
- Data Deficient (IUCN 3.1)

Scientific classification
- Kingdom: Plantae
- Clade: Tracheophytes
- Clade: Angiosperms
- Clade: Eudicots
- Clade: Rosids
- Order: Myrtales
- Family: Myrtaceae
- Genus: Syzygium
- Species: S. abatakum

Binomial name
- Syzygium abatakum Widodo

Species of flowering plant

Syzygium abatakum is a species of flowering plant in the family Myrtaceae native to Sumatra, where it is known as kalek jambu (in Minangkabau) or kilat jambu.

The species is a tree that grows up to 10 m (33 ft) in height. The leaves are oppositely arranged, and white flowers are borne on a terminal panicle/corymb. The fruits have not been observed. It most closely resembles Syzygium pyrifolium and Syzygium angbahsin.

Syzygium abatakum occurs in lowland forests at elevations between 100 and 930 m (330 and 3,050 ft).
