= Syzygium ridleyi =

Conservation status
- Least Concern (IUCN 2.3)

Scientific classification
- Kingdom: Plantae
- Clade: Tracheophytes
- Clade: Angiosperms
- Clade: Eudicots
- Clade: Rosids
- Order: Myrtales
- Family: Myrtaceae
- Genus: Syzygium
- Species: S. ridleyi

Binomial name
- Syzygium ridleyi (King) Chantar. & J.Parn.

Synonyms
- Eugenia ridleyi King

Species of flowering plant

Syzygium ridleyi is a species of flowering plant in the family Myrtaceae. It is found in Malaysia, Singapore, and Thailand.
