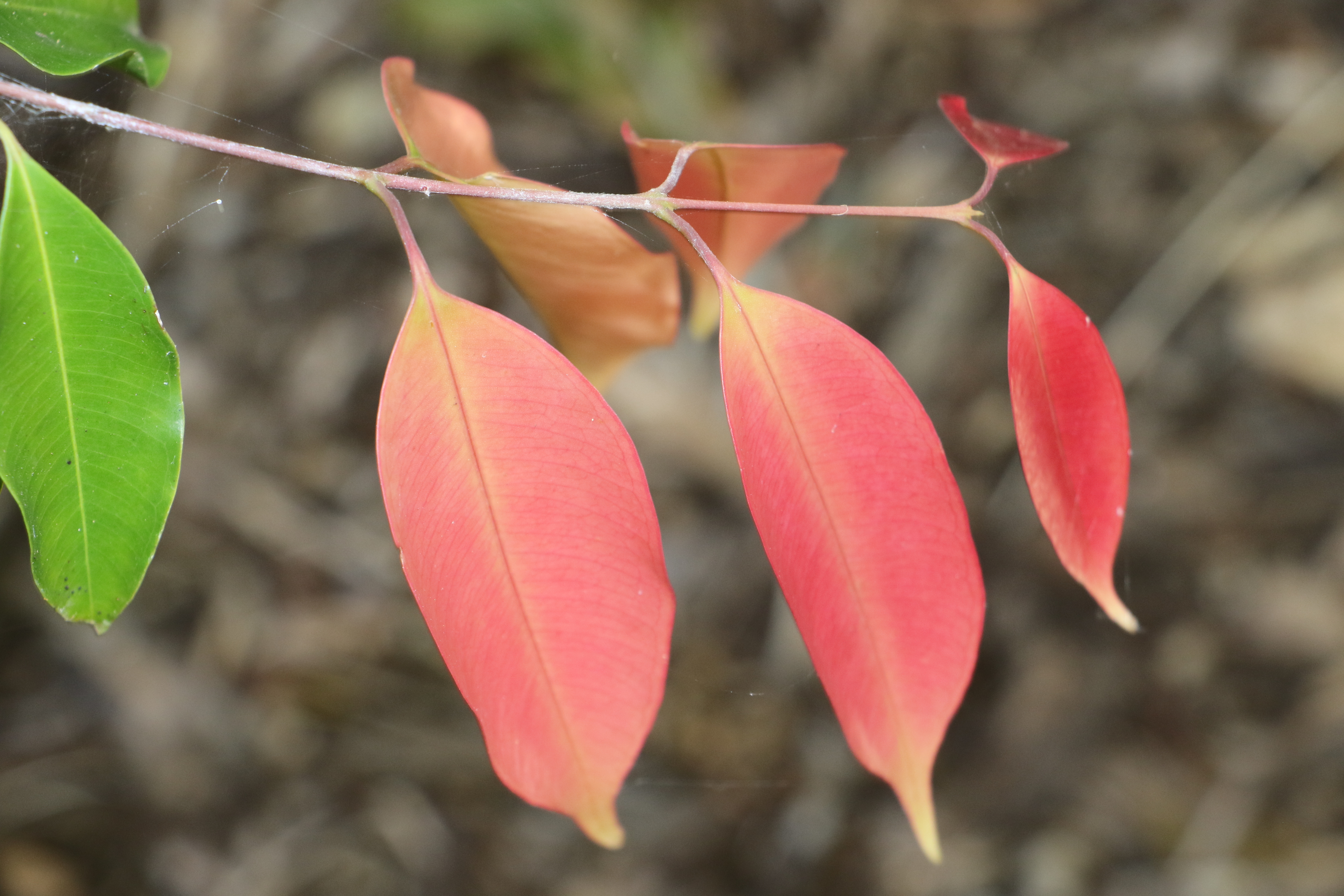

Scientific classification
- Kingdom: Plantae
- Clade: Tracheophytes
- Clade: Angiosperms
- Clade: Eudicots
- Clade: Rosids
- Order: Myrtales
- Family: Myrtaceae
- Genus: Syzygium
- Species: S. monimioides

Binomial name
- Syzygium monimioides Craven

= Syzygium monimioides =

Species of tree

Syzygium monimioides is a rainforest tree of tropical Queensland, Australia. Known only from near Cooktown, it is a locally common understorey tree, which can have up to 30 trunks per mature plant.
