= Syzygium utilis =

Conservation status
- Data Deficient (IUCN 2.3)

Scientific classification
- Kingdom: Plantae
- Clade: Embryophytes
- Clade: Tracheophytes
- Clade: Spermatophytes
- Clade: Angiosperms
- Clade: Eudicots
- Clade: Rosids
- Order: Myrtales
- Family: Myrtaceae
- Genus: Syzygium
- Species: S. utilis

Binomial name
- Syzygium utilis (Talbot) Rathakr. & N.C.Nair

Synonyms
- Eugenia utilis Talbot

Species of flowering plant

Syzygium utilis is a species of plant in the family Myrtaceae. It is a tree endemic to western India, where it grows in evergreen forest.
