= Syzygium formosum =

Conservation status
- Least Concern (IUCN 3.1)

Scientific classification
- Kingdom: Plantae
- Clade: Tracheophytes
- Clade: Angiosperms
- Clade: Eudicots
- Clade: Rosids
- Order: Myrtales
- Family: Myrtaceae
- Genus: Syzygium
- Species: S. formosum

Binomial name
- Syzygium formosum (Wall.) Mason

Synonyms
- 20 synonyms: Eugenia formosa Wall.; Jambosa formosa (Wall.) G.Don; Eugenia formosa var. ternifolia (Roxb.) Duthie; Eugenia lancifolia Miq.; Eugenia lilacina Merr.; Eugenia nemoricola Ridl.; Eugenia perakensis King; Eugenia pseudoformosa King; Eugenia ternifolia Roxb.; Jambosa insignis Blume; Jambosa lancifolia Miq.; Jambosa mappacea Korth.; Jambosa ternifolia Sweet; Jambosa ternifolia (Roxb.) Walp.; Syzygium insigne (Blume) Merr. & L.M.Perry; Syzygium lancifolium (Miq.) Merr. & L.M.Perry; Syzygium lilacinum (Merr.) Merr. & L.M.Perry; Syzygium mappaceum (Korth.) Merr. & L.M.Perry; Syzygium perakense (King) I.M.Turner; Syzygium pseudoformosum (King) Merr. & L.M.Perry; Syzygium ternifolium (Roxb.) P.H.Hô

Species of flowering plant

Syzygium formosum is a species of plant in the family Myrtaceae. It is a tree with a distribution from the central Himalayas through Indochina to Malesia. It is an understorey tree which grows up to 20 m tall. It grows along streams and rivers in moist lowland primary mixed dipterocarp forests and secondary forest, typically on sandy to clay soils, up to 300 metres elevation.

The species was first described as Eugenia formosa by Nathaniel Wallich in 1830. In 1851 Francis Mason placed the species in genus Syzygium as S. formosum.
