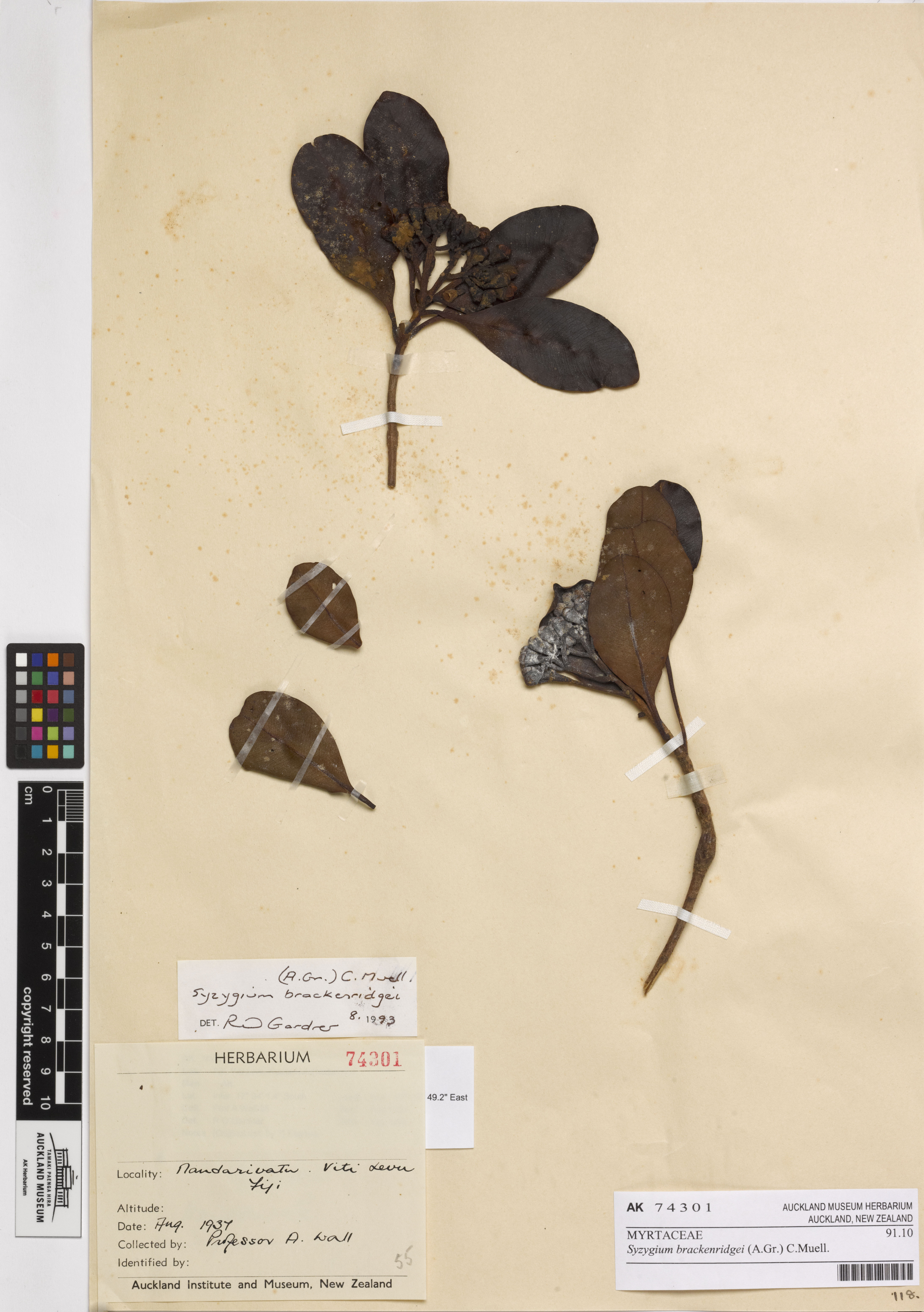

Conservation status
- Least Concern (IUCN 3.1)

Scientific classification
- Kingdom: Plantae
- Clade: Tracheophytes
- Clade: Angiosperms
- Clade: Eudicots
- Clade: Rosids
- Order: Myrtales
- Family: Myrtaceae
- Genus: Syzygium
- Species: S. brackenridgei

Binomial name
- Syzygium brackenridgei (A.Gray) Müll.Berol. (1858)

Synonyms
- Eugenia brackenridgei A.Gray (1854); Pareugenia brackenridgei (A.Gray) A.C.Sm. (1936); Pareugenia imthurnii Turrill (1915); Syzygium imthurnii (Turrill) Merr. & L.M.Perry (1942)

= Syzygium brackenridgei =

Species of flowering plant

Syzygium brackenridgei is a species of flowering plant in the myrtle family, Myrtaceae. It is a tree native to Fiji and Tonga. which grows from 3 to 20 metres tall. It grows in dense lowland and montane tropical forests, forest patches in open areas, and thickets on ridge crests, from 50 to 1,150 metres elevation. The IUCN Red List assesses the species as Least Concern.
