= Syzygium rostadonis =

Conservation status
- Data Deficient (IUCN 2.3)

Scientific classification
- Kingdom: Plantae
- Clade: Tracheophytes
- Clade: Angiosperms
- Clade: Eudicots
- Clade: Rosids
- Order: Myrtales
- Family: Myrtaceae
- Genus: Syzygium
- Species: S. rostadonis

Binomial name
- Syzygium rostadonis (Ridl.) I.M.Turner

Synonyms
- Eugenia rostadonis Ridl.

Species of tree

Syzygium rostadonis is a species of flowering plant in the family Myrtaceae. It is a tree endemic to Peninsular Malaysia.
