= Eugenia myrtifolia =

Eugenia myrtifolia can refer to:

- Eugenia myrtifolia Sims, a synonym of Syzygium australe (J.C.Wendl. ex Link) B.Hyland (Australia)
- Eugenia myrtifolia Roxb., a synonym of Syzygium myrtifolium Walp. (Tropical Asia)
- Eugenia myrtifolia Cambess., a synonym of Eugenia neomyrtifolia Sobral (southeastern and southern Brazil)
- Eugenia myrtifolia Salisb., a synonym of Eugenia uniflora L. (South America)
