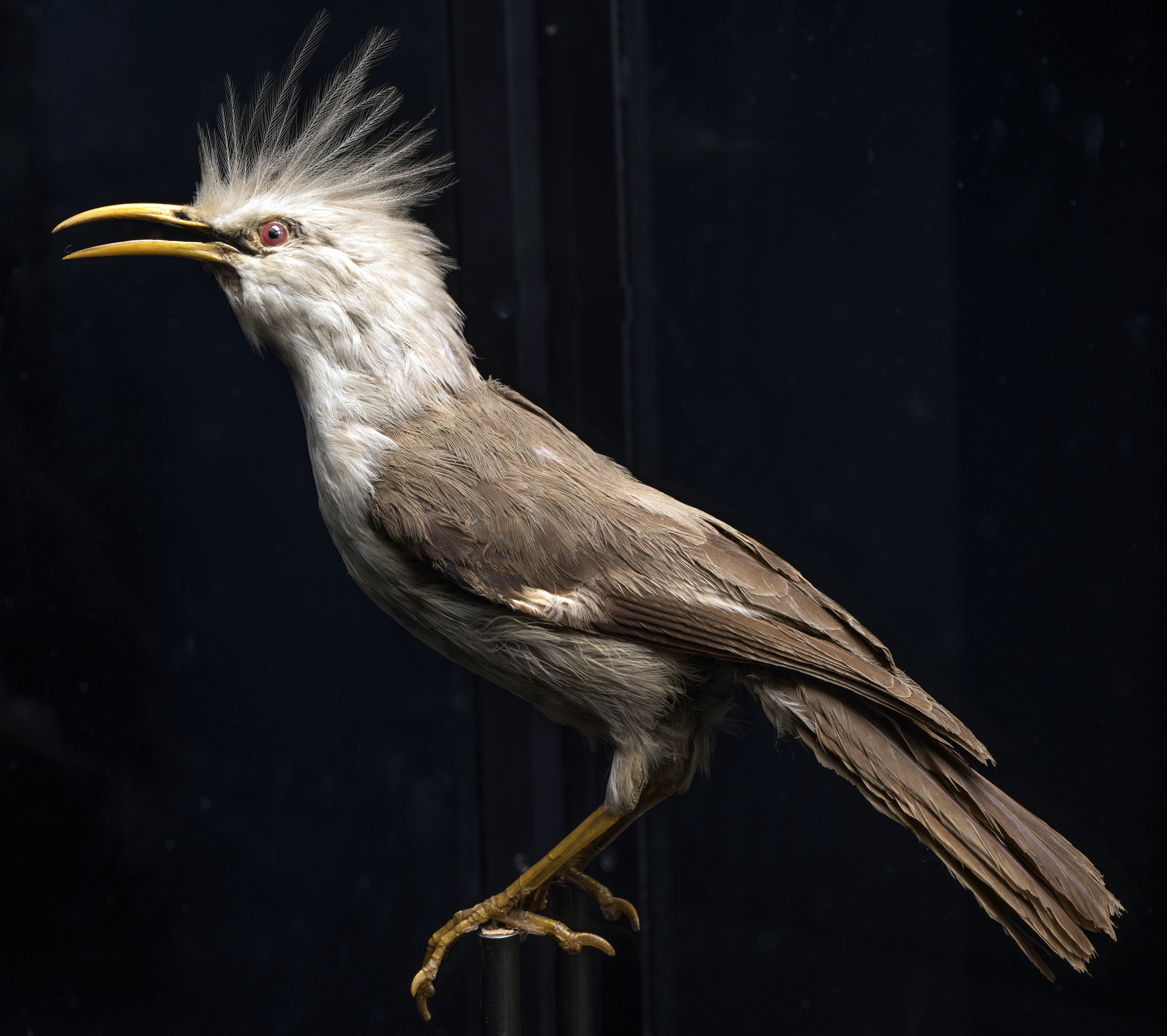
- Specimen in Musée Cantonal de Zoologie, Lausanne

Conservation status
- Extinct (ca. 1850) (IUCN 3.1)

Scientific classification
- Kingdom: Animalia
- Phylum: Chordata
- Class: Aves
- Order: Passeriformes
- Family: Sturnidae
- Genus: †Fregilupus; Lesson, 1831
- Species: †F. varius

Binomial name
- †Fregilupus varius (Boddaert, 1783)
- Location of Réunion (circled)

Synonyms
- List: Upupa varia Boddaert, 1783; Upupa capensis Gmelin, 1788; Upupa madagascariensis Shaw, 1811; Coracia cristata Vieillot, 1817; Pastor upupa Wagler, 1827; Fregilupus capensis Lesson, 1831; Coracia tinouch Hartlaub, 1861; Fregilupus borbonicus Vinson, 1868; Fregilupus varia Gray, 1870; Sturnus capensis Schlegel, 1872; Lophopsarus varius Sundeval, 1872; Coracias tivouch Murie, 1874

= Hoopoe starling =

Extinct species of crested starling from Réunion Island

The hoopoe starling (Fregilupus varius), also known as the Réunion starling or the Bourbon crested starling, is a species of starling that lived on the Mascarene island of Réunion and became extinct in the 1850s. Its closest relatives were the also-extinct Rodrigues starling and the Mauritius starling from nearby islands, and the three apparently originated in Southeast Asia. The bird was first mentioned during the 17th century and was long thought to be related to the hoopoe, from which its name is derived. Some affinities have been proposed, but it was confirmed as a starling in a DNA study.

The hoopoe starling was 30 cm (12 in) in length. Its plumage was primarily white and grey, with its back, wings and tail a darker brown and grey. It had a light, mobile crest, which curled forwards. The bird is thought to have been sexually dimorphic, with males larger and having more curved beaks. The juveniles were more brown than the adults. Little is known about hoopoe starling behaviour. Reportedly living in large flocks, it inhabited humid areas and marshes. The hoopoe starling was omnivorous, feeding on plant matter and insects. Its pelvis was robust, its feet and claws large, and its jaws strong, indicating that it foraged near the ground.

The birds were hunted by settlers on Réunion, who also kept them as pets. Nineteen specimens exist in museums around the world. The hoopoe starling was reported to be in decline by the early 19th century and was probably extinct before the 1860s. Several factors have been proposed, including competition and predation by introduced species, disease, the deforestation of the island, and persecution by humans, who hunted it for food and as an alleged crop pest.

== Taxonomy ==
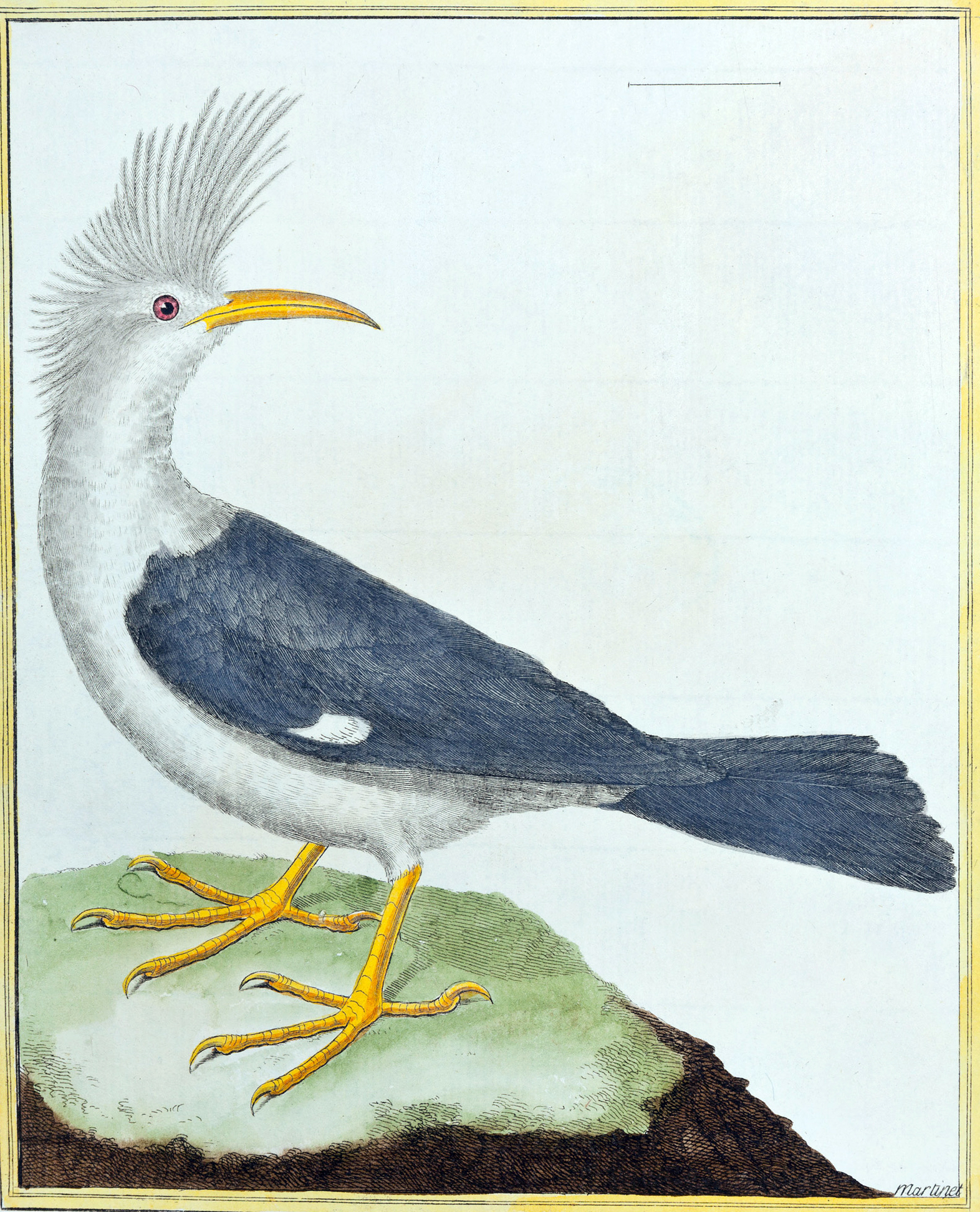
1770s type illustration by François-Nicolas Martinet

The first account thought to mention the hoopoe starling is a 1658 list of birds of Madagascar written by French governor Étienne de Flacourt. He mentioned a black-and-grey "tivouch" or hoopoe; later authors have wondered whether this referred to the hoopoe starling or the Madagascan subspecies of the hoopoe (Upupa epops marginata), which resembles the Eurasian subspecies. The hoopoe starling was first noted on the Mascarene island of Réunion (then called "Bourbon") by Père Vachet in 1669, and first described in detail by French traveler Sieur Dubois's in 1674:

Hoopoes or 'Calandres', having a white tuft on the head, the rest of the plumage white and grey, the bill and the feet like a bird of prey; they are a little larger than the young pigeons. This is another good game [i.e., to eat] when it is fat.

Early settlers on Réunion referred to the bird as "huppe", because of the similarity of its crest and curved bill with that of the hoopoe. Little was recorded about the hoopoe starling during the next 100 years, but specimens began to be brought to Europe during the 18th century. The species was first scientifically described by French naturalist Philippe Guéneau de Montbeillard in the 1779 edition of French naturalist Comte de Buffon's Histoire Naturelle, and received its scientific name from Dutch naturalist Pieter Boddaert for the book's 1783 edition. Boddaert named the bird Upupa varia; its genus name is that of the hoopoe, and its specific name means "variegated", describing its black-and-white colour.

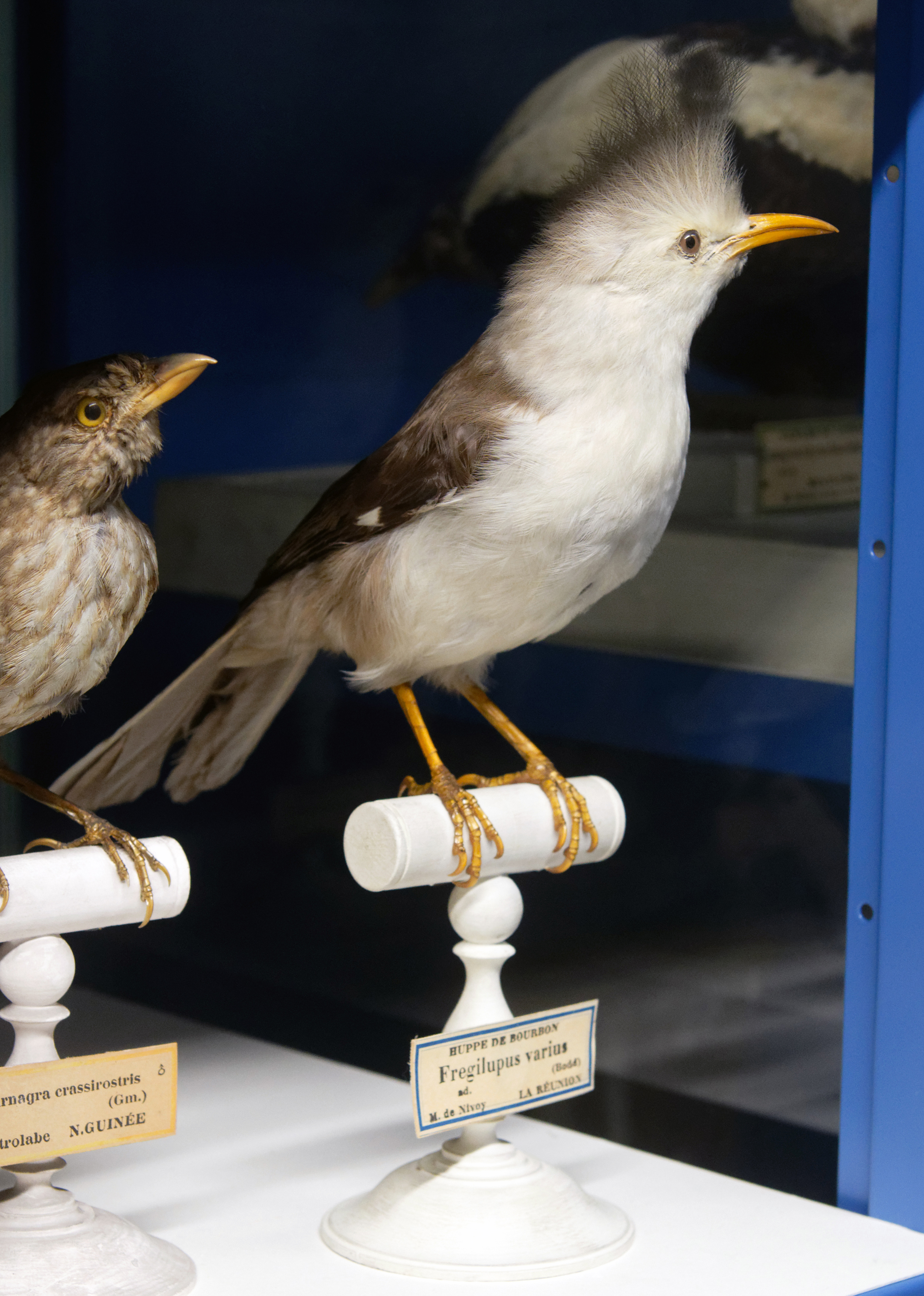
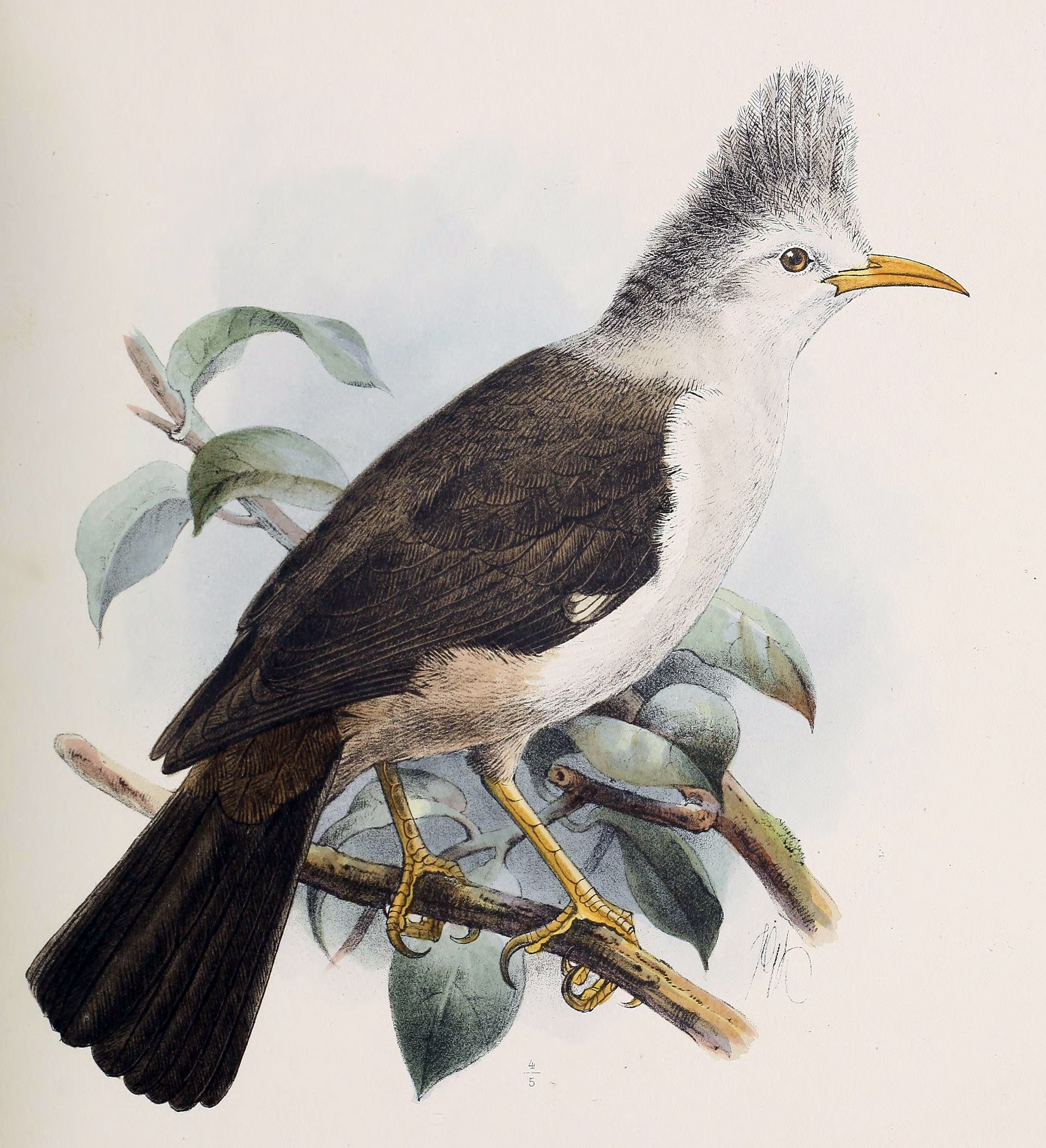
Specimen in National Museum of Natural History, Paris (left) and 1893 illustration of same by John Gerrard Keulemans; the crest is similar to that shown in the type illustration

Boddaert provided Linnean binomial names for plates in Buffon's works, so the accompanying 1770s plate of the hoopoe starling by French engraver François-Nicolas Martinet is considered the holotype or type illustration. Though the plate may have been based on a specimen in the National Museum of Natural History in Paris, this is impossible to determine today; the Paris museum originally had five hoopoe starling skins (some of which only arrived during the 19th century), one was exchanged with the Swedish Museum of Natural History, Stockholm, and two have since disappeared. The possibly female specimen MNHN 2000–756, one of the most-illustrated skins, has an artificially trimmed crest resulting in an unnaturally semi-circular shape, unlike its appearance in life; the type illustration has a similarly shaped crest.

De Flacourt's "tivouch" led early writers to believe that variants of the bird were found on Madagascar and the Cape of Africa; they were thought to be hoopoes of the genus Upupa, which received names such as Upupa capensis and Upupa madagascariensis. Some authors also allied the bird with groups such as birds-of-paradise, bee-eaters, cowbirds, Icteridae, and choughs, resulting in its reassignment to other genera with new names, such as Coracia cristata and Pastor upupa. In 1831, French naturalist René-Primevère Lesson placed the bird in its own monotypic genus, Fregilipus, a composite of Upupa and Fregilus, the latter a defunct genus name of the chough. French naturalist Auguste Vinson established in 1868 that the bird was restricted to the island of Réunion and proposed a new binomial, Fregilupus borbonicus, referring to the former name of the island.

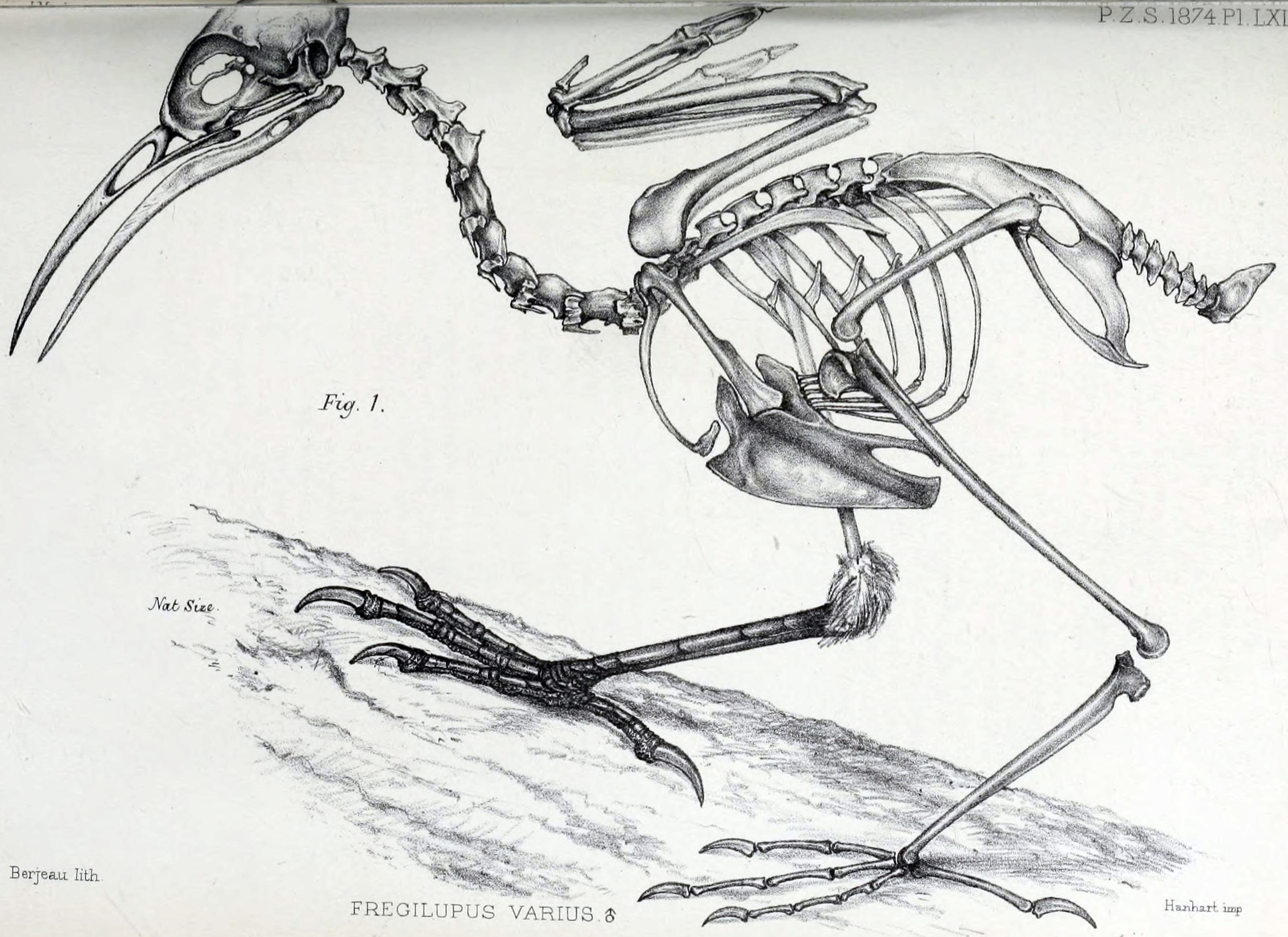
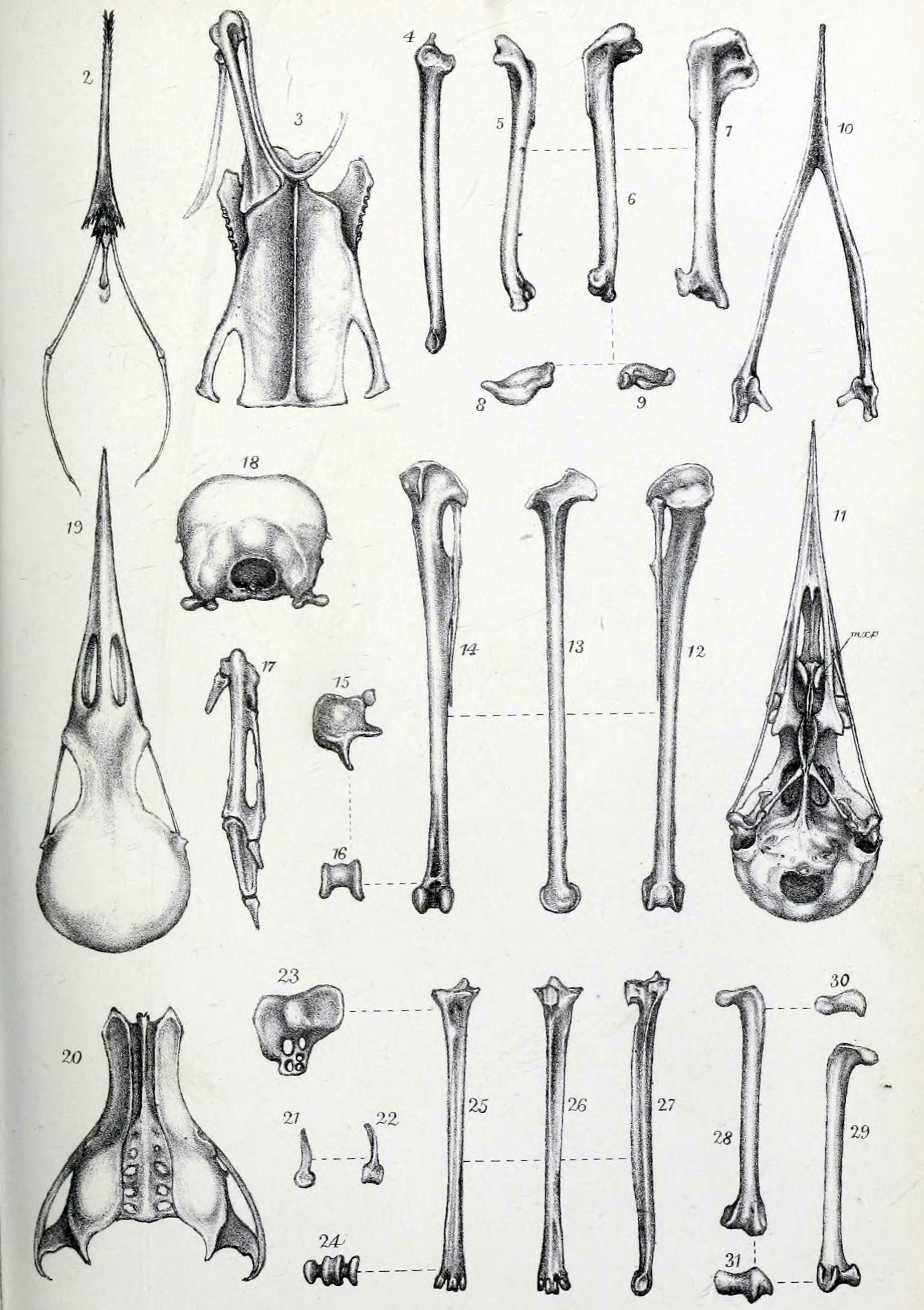
1874 lithographs of the only known skeleton and individual bones, by Philibert Charles Berjeau

German ornithologist Hermann Schlegel first proposed in 1857 that the species belonged to the starling family, (Sturnidae), reclassifying it as part of the genus Sturnus, S. capensis. This reclassification was observed by other authors; Swedish zoologist Carl Jakob Sundevall proposed the new genus name Lophopsarus ("crested starling") in 1872, yet Fregilupus varius—the oldest name—remains the bird's binomial, and all other scientific names are synonyms. In 1874, after a detailed analysis of the only known skeleton (held at the Cambridge University Museum of Zoology), British zoologist James Murie agreed that it was a starling. English zoologist Richard Bowdler Sharpe said in 1890 that the hoopoe starling was similar to the starling genus Basilornis, but did not note any similarities other than their crests.

In 1941, American ornithologist Malcolm R. Miller found the bird's musculature similar to that of the common starling (Sturnus vulgaris) after he dissected a specimen preserved in spirits at the Cambridge Museum, but noted that the tissue was very degraded and the similarity did not necessarily confirm a relationship with starlings. In 1957, American ornithologist Andrew John Berger cast doubt on the bird's affinity with starlings because of subtle anatomical differences, after dissecting a spirit specimen at the American Museum of Natural History. Some authors proposed a relationship with vangas (Vangidae), but Japanese ornithologist Hiroyuki Morioka rejected this in 1996, after a comparative study of skulls.

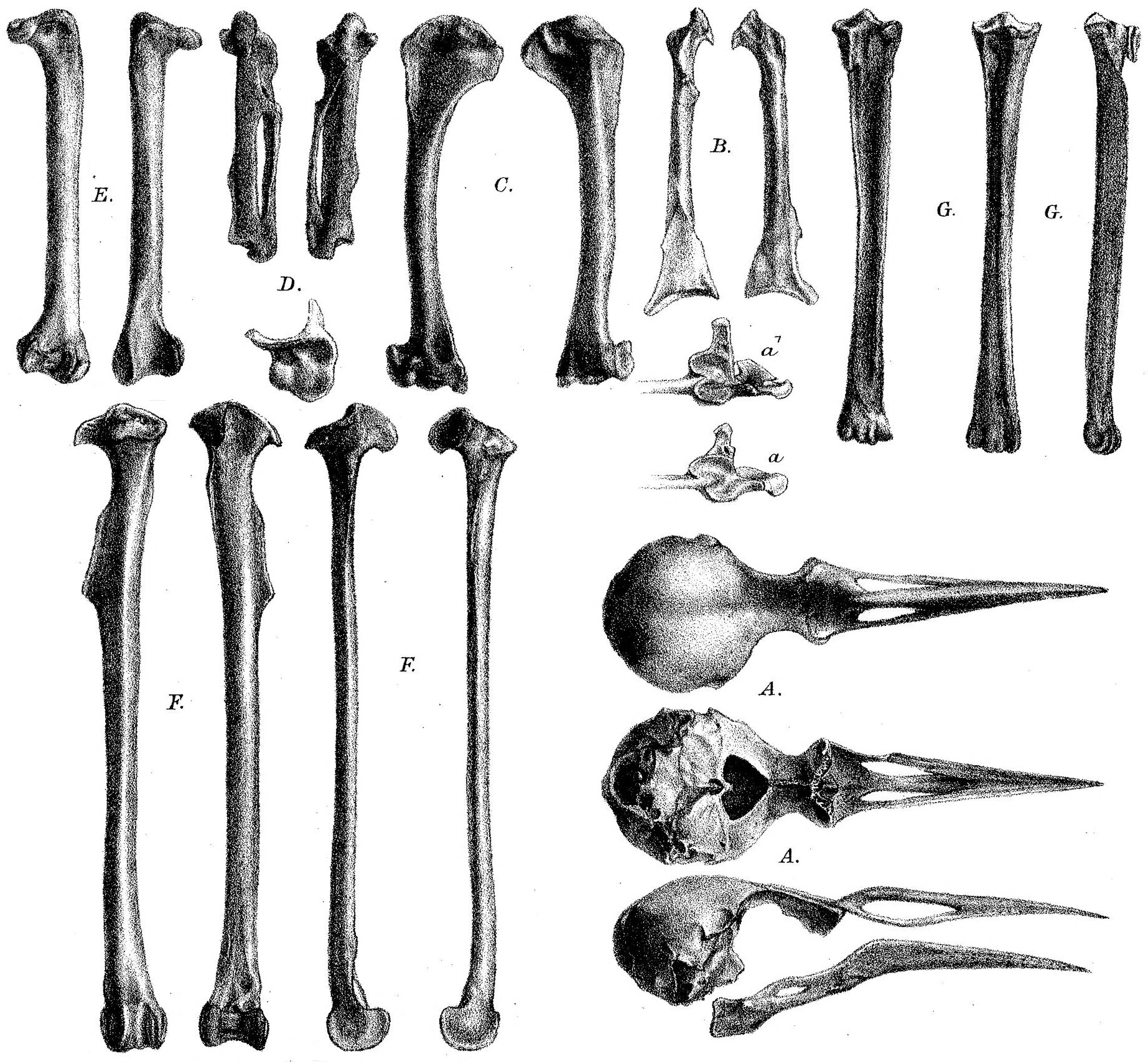
Subfossil bones of the related Rodrigues starling, described in 1879

In 1875, British ornithologist Alfred Newton attempted to identify a black-and-white bird mentioned in an 18th-century manuscript describing a marooned sailor's stay on the Mascarene island of Rodrigues in 1726–27, hypothesising that it was related to the hoopoe starling. Subfossil bones later found on Rodrigues were correlated with the bird in the manuscript; in 1879, these bones became the basis for a new species, Necropsar rodericanus (the Rodrigues starling), named by British ornithologists Albert Günther and Edward Newton. Günther and Newton found the Rodrigues bird closely related to the hoopoe starling, but kept it in a separate genus owing to "present ornithological practice". American ornithologist James Greenway suggested in 1967 that the Rodrigues starling belonged in the same genus as the hoopoe starling, owing to their close similarity. Subfossils found in 1974 confirmed that the Rodrigues bird was a distinct genus of starling; primarily, its stouter bill warrants generic separation from Fregilupus. In 2014, British palaeontologist Julian P. Hume described a new extinct species, the Mauritius starling (Cryptopsar ischyrhynchus), based on subfossils from Mauritius, which was closer to the Rodrigues starling than to the hoopoe starling in its skull, sternal (breastbone), and humeral features.

=== Evolution ===
In 1943, American ornithologist Dean Amadon suggested that Sturnus-like species could have arrived in Africa and given rise to the wattled starling (Creatophora cinerea) and the Mascarene starlings. According to Amadon, the Rodrigues and hoopoe starlings were related to Asiatic starlings — such as some Sturnus species — rather than to the glossy starlings (Lamprotornis) of Africa and the Madagascar starling (Saroglossa aurata), based on their colouration.

In 1999, the French palaeontologist Cécile Mourer-Chauviré and colleagues pointed out that Réunion is 3 million years old, which is enough time for new genera to evolve, but many endemics would have been wiped out by eruptions of the volcano Piton des Neiges between 300,000 and 180,000 years ago. Most recent and extant species would therefore probably be descendants of birds which had recolonised the island from Africa or Madagascar after this event. If the hoopoe starling had in fact evolved into a distinct genus on Réunion prior to the volcanic eruption, it would have been one of the few survivors of this extinction event.

A 2008 study by Italian zoologist Dario Zuccon and colleagues analysing the DNA of a variety of starlings confirmed that the hoopoe starling belonged in a clade of Southeast Asian starlings as an isolated lineage, with no close relatives. They used a toe-pad sample from the specimen in Stockholm (an earlier attempt by another team could not extract viable hoopoe starling DNA). The following cladogram shows its position:

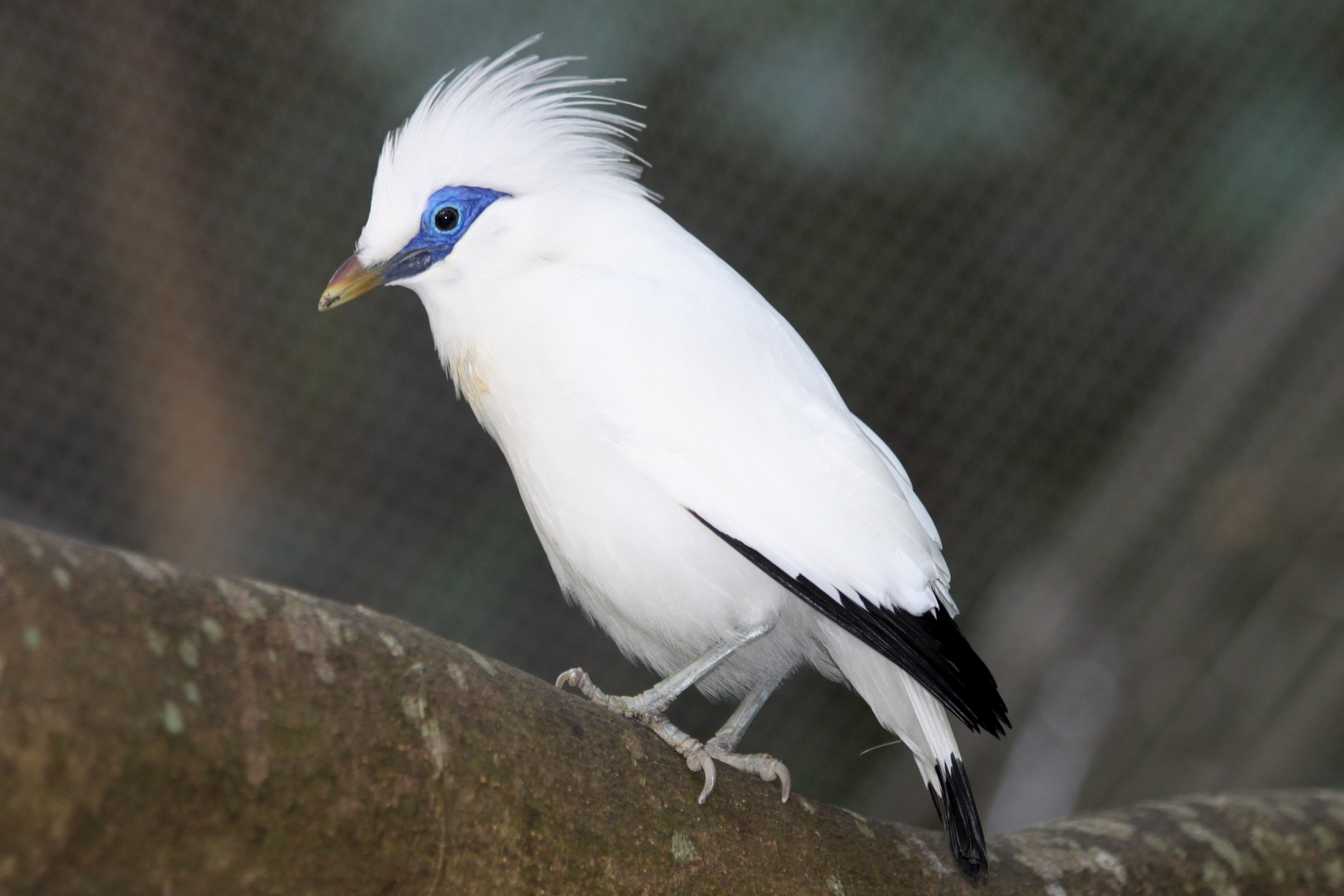
The related Bali myna, which is similarly coloured and also has a crest

- - Sturnornis albofrontatus (white-faced starling)
  - Leucopsar rothschildi (Bali myna)
  - - Fregilupus varius (hoopoe starling)
    - - Sturnia sinensis (white-shouldered starling)
      - - Sturnia pagodarum (brahminy starling)
        - - Sturnia erythropygia (white-headed starling)
          - Sturnia malabaricus (chestnut-tailed starling)

Zuccon and colleagues suggested that ancestors of the hoopoe starling reached Réunion from Southeast Asia by using island chains as "stepping stones" across the Indian Ocean, a scenario also suggested for other Mascarene birds. Its lineage diverged from that of other starlings 4 million years ago (about 2 million years before Réunion emerged from the sea), so it may have first evolved on landmasses now partially submerged.

Extant relations, such as the Bali myna (Leucopsar rothschildi) and the white-headed starling (Sturnia erythropygia), have similarities in colouration and other features with the extinct Mascarene species. According to Hume, since the Rodrigues and Mauritius starlings seem morphologically closer to each other than to the hoopoe starling — which appears closer to Southeast Asian starlings — there may have been two separate migrations of starlings from Asia to the Mascarenes, with the hoopoe starling the latest arrival. Except for Madagascar, the Mascarenes were the only islands in the southwestern Indian Ocean with native starlings, probably because of their isolation, varied topography, and vegetation.

In 2024, French biologist Jérôme Fuchs and colleagues also studied the Stockholm sample, and confirmed the species' close relations with the starling genera Sturnia, Leucopsar, and Sturnornis. Their divergence estimate converged with the emergence of Réunion 2.1–3.0 million years ago, and did not indicate stepping stone dispersal. They also reconstructed the population history of the species, and found it went through a strong genetic bottleneck about 200–300.000 years ago before increasing during the last 10.000 years, though its population was not especially low compared to other extinct or critically endangered birds. The decrease in its population was perhaps due to a sea-level increase caused by the last interglacial period, which reduced the bird's habitat on the island.

== Description ==
Turnaround video of specimen RMNH 110.050, Naturalis Biodiversity Center, Leiden

The hoopoe starling was 30 cm (12 in) in length. The bird's culmen was 41 mm (1 5/8 in) long, its wing 147 mm (5 13/16 in), its tail 114 mm (4 1/2 in), and its tarsus about 39 mm (1 9/16 in) long. It was the largest of the three Mascarene starlings. A presumed adult male (NHMUK 1889.5.30.15) in the Paris museum has a light ash-grey head and back of the neck (lighter on the hind-neck), with a long crest the same colour with white shafts. Its back and tail are ash-brown, its wings darker with a greyish wash, and its upper tail covert feathers and rump have a rufous wash. Its primary coverts are white with brown tips; the bases (instead of the tips) are brown in other specimens. The superciliary stripe, lore, and most of the specimen's underside is white, with a pale rufous wash on the flanks and undertail coverts. The extent of light rufous on the underside varies by specimen. The beak and legs are lemon-yellow, with yellow-brown claws. It has a bare, triangular area of skin around the eye, which may have been yellow in life. Though the species' iris was described as bluish-brown, it has been depicted as brown, yellow, or orange.

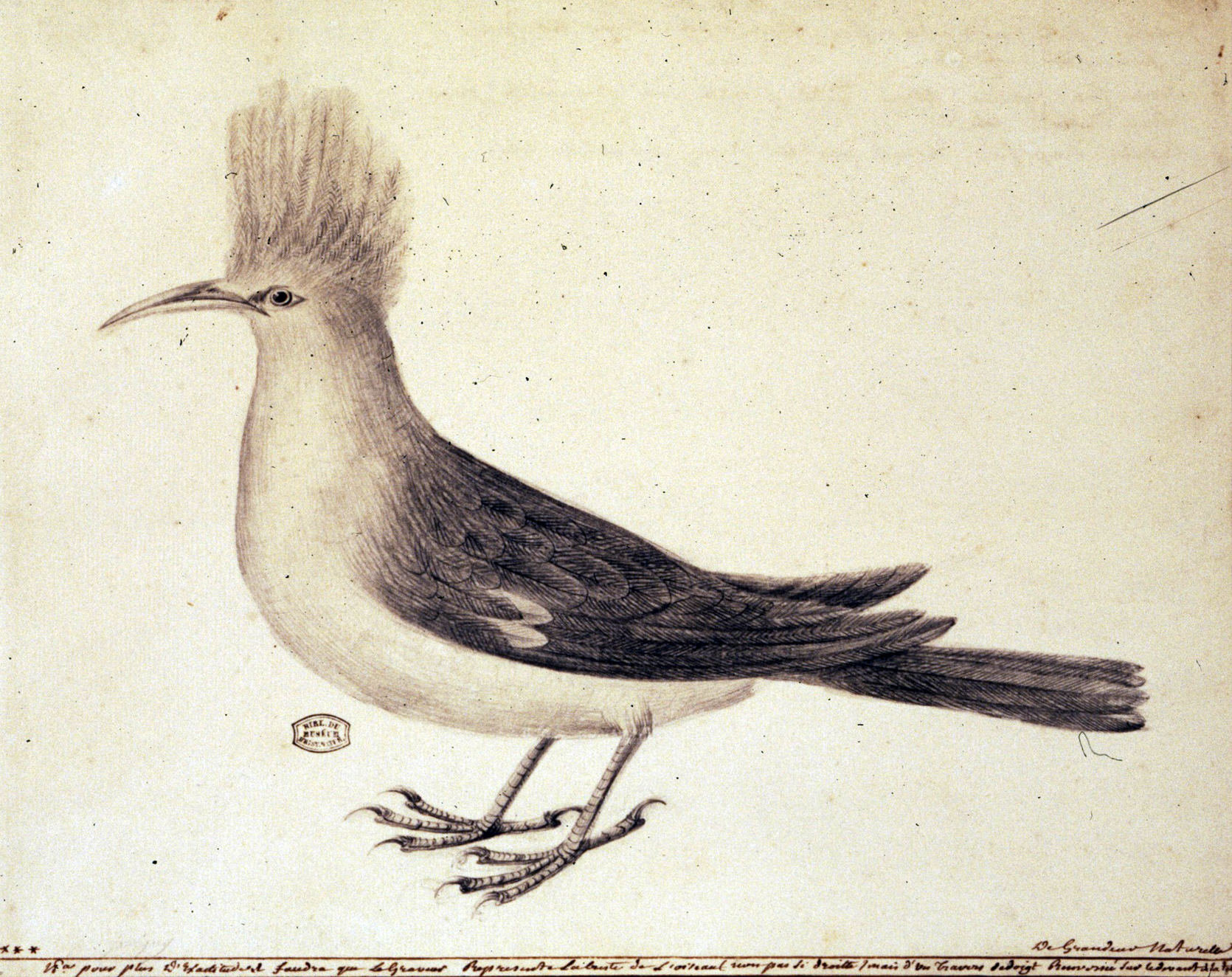
Only known life drawing, showing the natural position of the crest, by Paul Jossigny, early 1770s

There has been confusion about which characteristics were sexually dimorphic in the species. Only three specimens were sexed (all males), with age and individual variation not considered. The male is thought to have been largest with a longer, curvier beak. In 1911, Réunion resident Eugène Jacob de Cordemoy recalled his observations of the bird about 50 years before, suggesting that only males had a white crest, but this is thought to be incorrect. A presumed female (MNHN 2000–756) in the Paris museum appears to have a smaller crest, a smaller and less-curved beak, and smaller primary coverts. A juvenile specimen (MHNT O2650) has a smaller crest and primary coverts, with a brown wash instead of ash-grey on the crest, lore, and superciliary stripe, and a light-brown (instead of an ash-brown) back. The juveniles of some Southeast Asian starlings are also browner than adults.

Vinson, who observed live hoopoe starlings when he lived on Réunion, described the crest as flexible, disunited and forward-curled barbs of various lengths, highest in the centre, and able to be erected at will. He compared the bird's crest to that of a cockatoo and to the tail feathers of a bird-of-paradise. Most mounted specimens have an erect crest, indicating its natural position. The only illustration of the hoopoe starling now thought to have been made from life was drawn by French artist Paul Philippe Sauguin de Jossigny during the early 1770s. Jossigny instructed engravers under the drawing that for accuracy, they should depict the crest angled forward from the head (not straight up). Hume believes that Martinet did this when he made the type illustration, and it was derivative of Jossigny's image rather than a life drawing. Jossigny also made the only known life drawing of the now-extinct Newton's parakeet (Psittacula exsul) after a specimen sent to him from Rodrigues to Mauritius, so this is perhaps also where he drew the hoopoe starling. Murie suggested that only the illustrations by Martinet and Jacques Barraband were "original", since he was unaware of Jossigny's drawing, but noted a crudeness and stiffness in them which made neither appear lifelike.

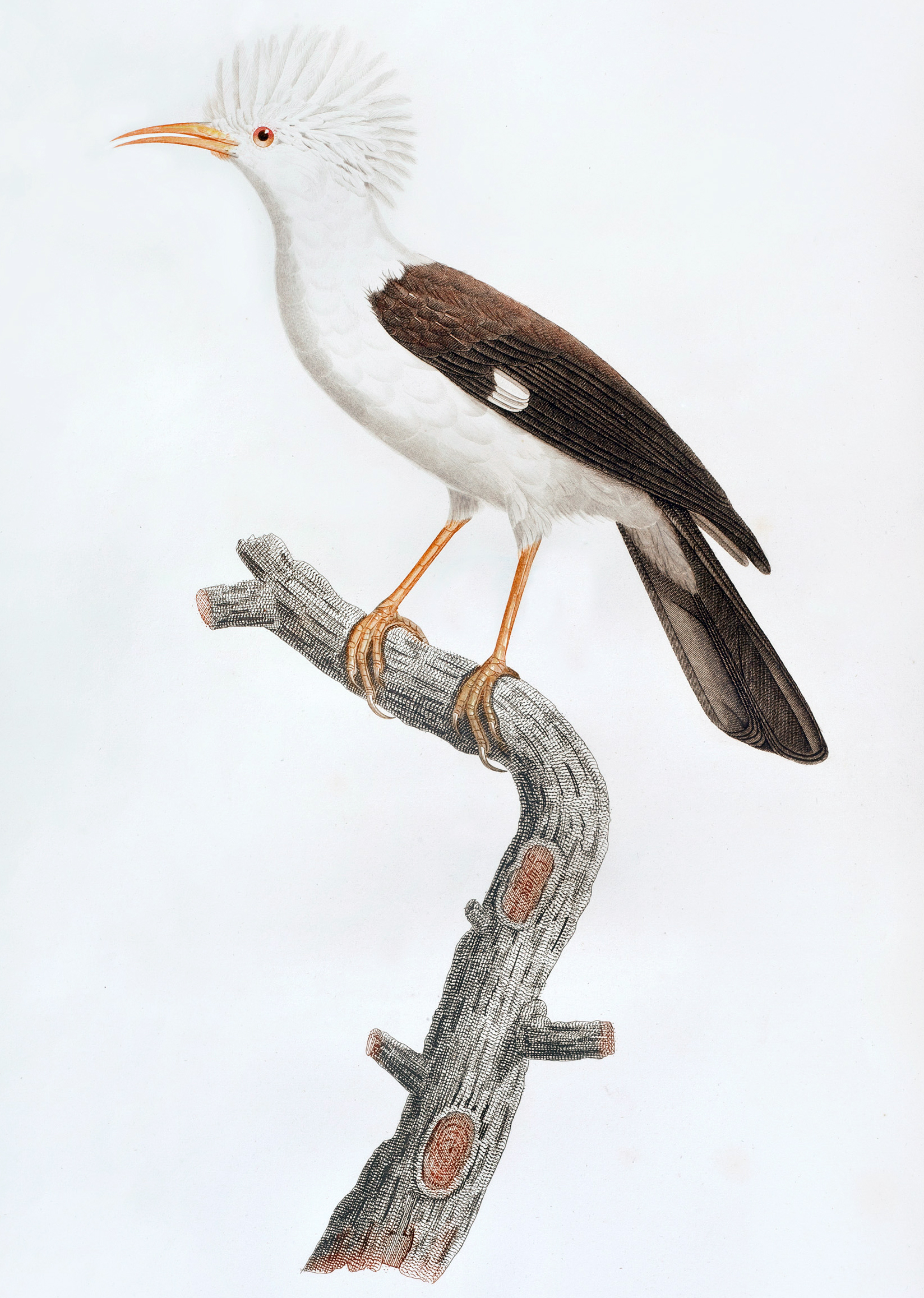
1807 illustration by Jacques Barraband which has been described as stiff and not lifelike

The hoopoe starling can be distinguished skeletally from other Mascarene starlings by its cranium being rounded when seen from above, bulbous towards the back. The frontal bone was narrow, and the foramen magnum (the opening for the spinal cord) was large. The rostrum was long and narrow, with narrow, oval narial-openings (bony nostrils). The upper beak was narrow and strongly decurved, and the lower beak was narrow and sharply pointed. The mandible had a distinct retroarticular process (which connected with the skull), and there was a single large mandibular fenestra (opening). The sternum was short and wide, particularly at the hind end. The coracoid was relatively reduced in length, and its shaft was robust. The humerus (upper arm bone) was robust with a straight shaft, with the upper and lower ends flattened from front to back. The radius of the lower arm was robust. The pelvis was extremely robust. The femur (thigh bone) was robust, especially at the upper and lower ends, and the shaft was straight. The tibiotarsus (lower leg bone) was long and robust, with a broad and expanded shaft, especially near the lower end. The tarsometatarsus (ankle bone) was long and robust, with a relatively straight shaft.

== Behaviour and ecology ==
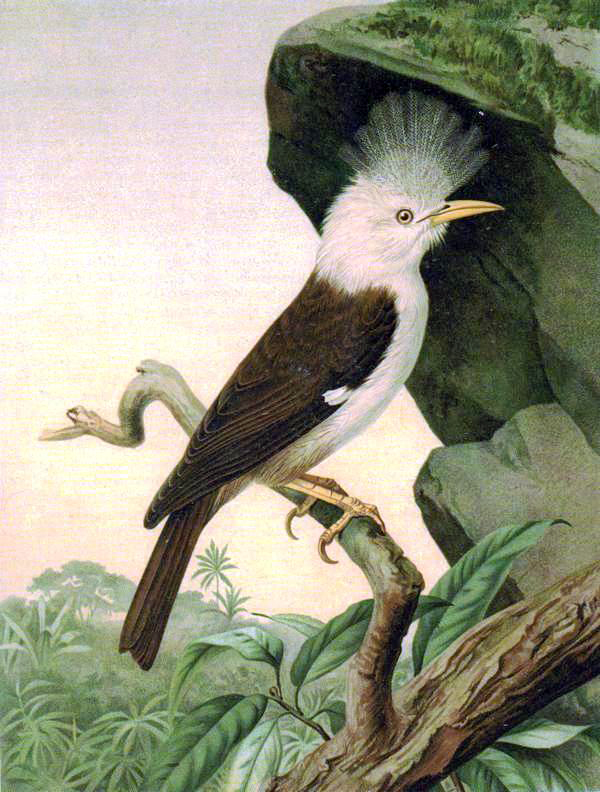
1910 illustration by Eduard de Maes

Little is known about the behaviour of the hoopoe starling. According to François Levaillant's 1807 account of the bird (which included observations from a Réunion resident) it was abundant, with large flocks inhabiting humid areas and marshes. In 1831, Lesson, without explanation, described its habits as similar to those of a crow. Its song was described as a "bright and cheerful whistle" and "clear notes", indicating a similarity to the songs of other starlings. Vinson's 1877 account relates his experiences with the bird more than 50 years earlier:

Now these daughters of the wood, when they were numerous, flew in flocks and went thus in the rain forests, while deviating little from one another, as good companions or as nymphs taking a bath: they lived on berries, seeds and insects, and the créoles, disgusted by the latter fact, held them for an impure game. Sometimes, coming from the woods to the littoral [coast], always flying and leaping from tree to tree, branch to branch, they often alighted in swarms on coffee trees in bloom, and there was in the past the testimony of an inhabitant of the Island of Bourbon, said the naturalist Levaillant, that they caused big damage in coffee trees by making the flowers fall prematurely. But it is not the white flowers of coffee that the hoopoes were searching for and thus behaving so, it was for the caterpillars and insects that devoured them; and in this they made an important service to the silviculture of the Island of Bourbon and the rich coffee plantations, with which this land was then covered, the golden age of the country!

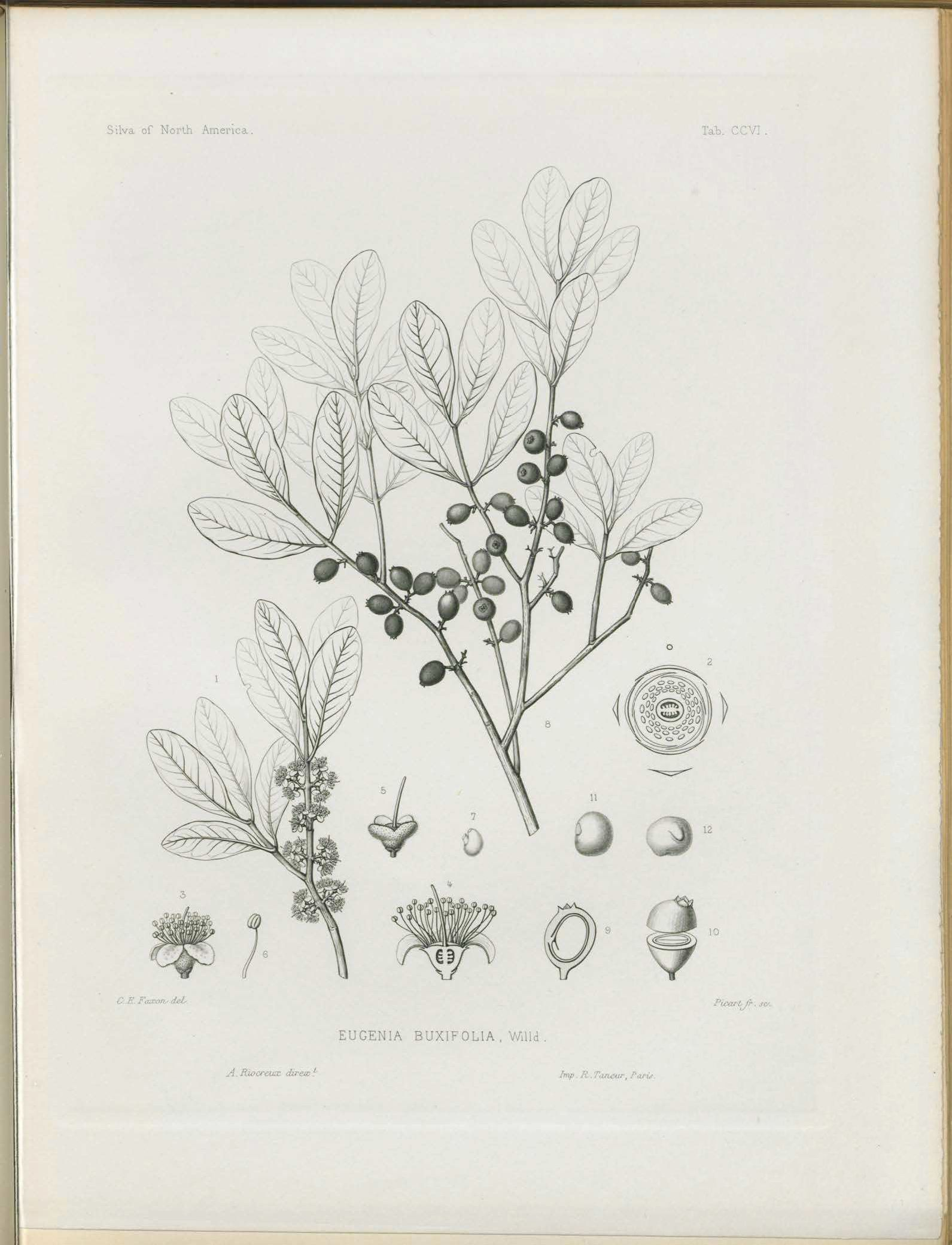
This bird fed on seeds and berries possibly belonging to Eugenia buxifolia, as depicted here in 1893

Like most other starlings, the hoopoe starling was omnivorous, feeding on fruits, seeds, and insects. Its tongue — long, slender, sharp, and frayed — may have been able to move rapidly, helpful when feeding on fruit, nectar, pollen, and invertebrates. Its pelvic elements were robust and its feet and claws large, indicating that it foraged near the ground. Its jaws were strong; Morioka compared its skull to that of the hoopoe, and it may have foraged in a similar way, probing and opening holes in substrate by inserting and opening its beak.

De Montbeillard was informed of the stomach contents of a dissected specimen, consisting of seeds and the berries of "Pseudobuxus" (possibly Eugenia buxifolia, a bush with sweet, orange berries). He noted that the bird weighed 110 grams (4 oz), and was fatter around June and July. Several accounts suggest that the hoopoe starling migrated on Réunion, spending six months in the lowlands and six months in the mountains. Food may have been easier to obtain in the lowlands during winter, with the birds breeding in the mountain forests during summer. The hoopoe starling probably nested in tree cavities. Belgian biologist Michaël P. J. Nicolaï and colleagues pointed out in 2020 that the hoopoe starling had black skin combined with light plumage and lived in high irradiation zones, which may have evolved for protection against ultraviolet irradiation in this and other black-skinned birds.

Many other endemic species on Réunion became extinct after the arrival of humans and the resulting disruption of the island's ecosystem. The hoopoe starling lived with other now-extinct birds, such as the Réunion ibis, the Mascarene parrot, the Réunion parakeet, the Réunion swamphen, the Réunion scops owl, the Réunion night heron, and the Réunion pink pigeon. Extinct Réunion reptiles include the Réunion giant tortoise and an undescribed Leiolopisma skink. The small Mauritian flying fox and the snail Tropidophora carinata lived on Réunion and Mauritius before vanishing from both islands.

== Relationship with humans ==
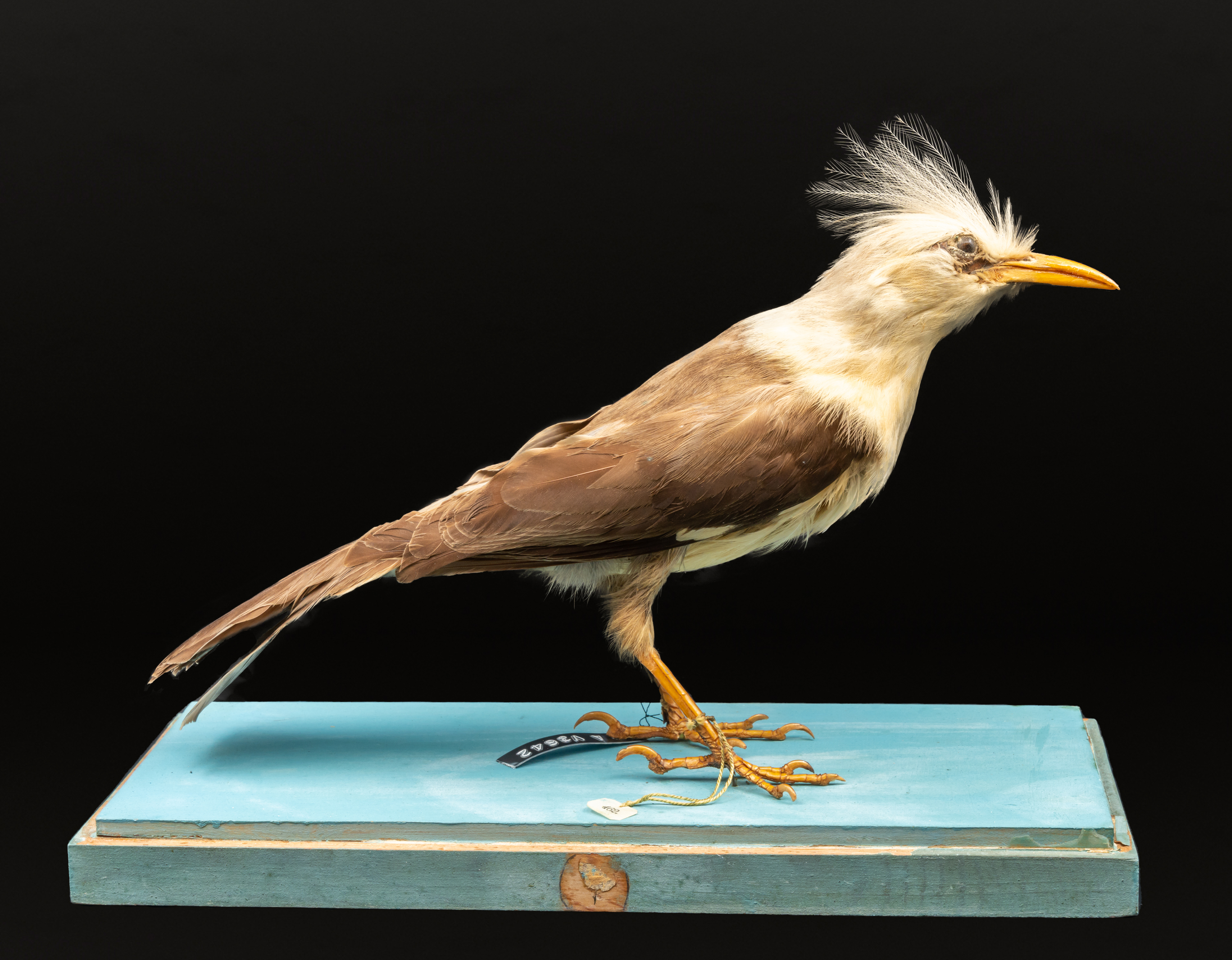
Specimen in the Pisa Charterhouse

The hoopoe starling was described as tame and easily hunted. In 1704, French pilot engineer Jean Feuilley explained how the birds were caught by humans and cats:

Hoopoes and merles [Hypsipetes borbonicus] are the same fatness as those in France, and are of a marvellous taste, which are fat at the same time as parrots, living on the same foods. In order to catch them, hunting was done with staffs or long thin poles from six to seven feet in length, though this hunt is infrequently seen. The marrons [escaped] cats destroy many. These birds allow themselves to be approached very closely, so the cats take them without leaving their places.

The hoopoe starling was kept as a pet on Réunion and Mauritius, and although the bird was becoming scarcer, some specimens were obtained during the early 19th century. It is unknown whether any live specimens were ever transported from the Mascarenes. Two specimens that had lived in the aviary of French natural historian Julien Desjardins were pickled and given to the Paris museum in 1839. Cordemoy recalled that captive birds could be fed a wide variety of food, such as bananas, potatoes, and chayote, and wild birds would never enter inhabited areas. Many individuals survived on Mauritius after escaping there, and it was thought that a feral population could be established. The Mauritian population lasted less than a decade; the final specimen on the island (the last definite record of a live specimen anywhere) was taken in 1836. Specimens could still be collected on Réunion during the 1830s and, possibly, the early 1840s.

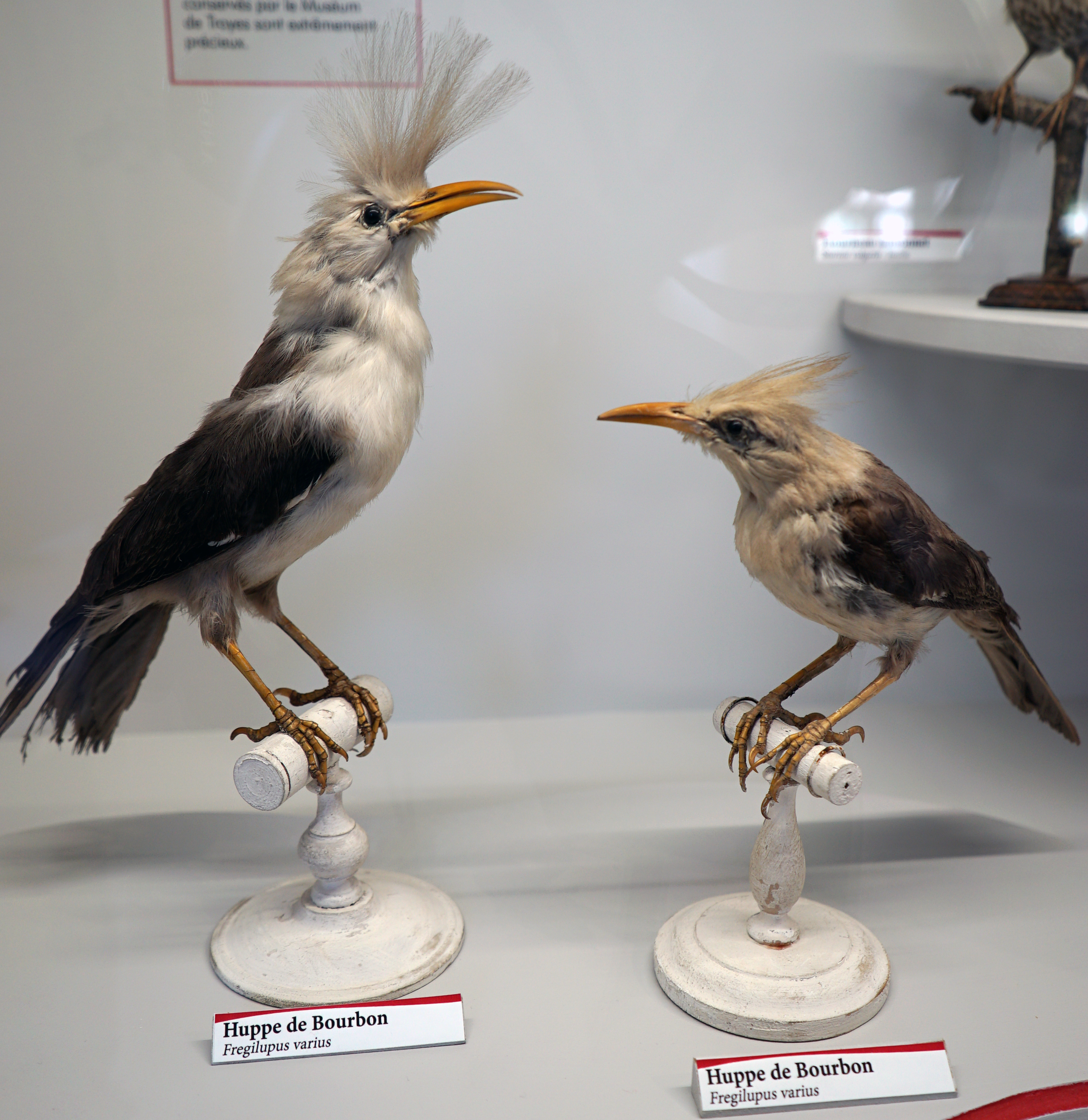
Specimens in Musée des beaux-arts de Troyes

There are 19 surviving hoopoe starling specimens in museums around the world (including one skeleton and two specimens preserved in spirits), with two in the Paris Museum and four in Troyes. Additional skins in Turin, Livorno, and Caen were destroyed during World War II, and four skins have disappeared from Réunion and Mauritius (which now have one each). Specimens were sent to Europe beginning in the second half of the 18th century, with most collected during the first half of the 19th century. It is unclear when each specimen was acquired, and specimens were frequently moved between collections. It is also unclear which specimens were the basis for which descriptions and illustrations. The only known subfossil hoopoe starling specimen is a femur, discovered in 1993 in a Réunion grotto.

=== Extinction ===
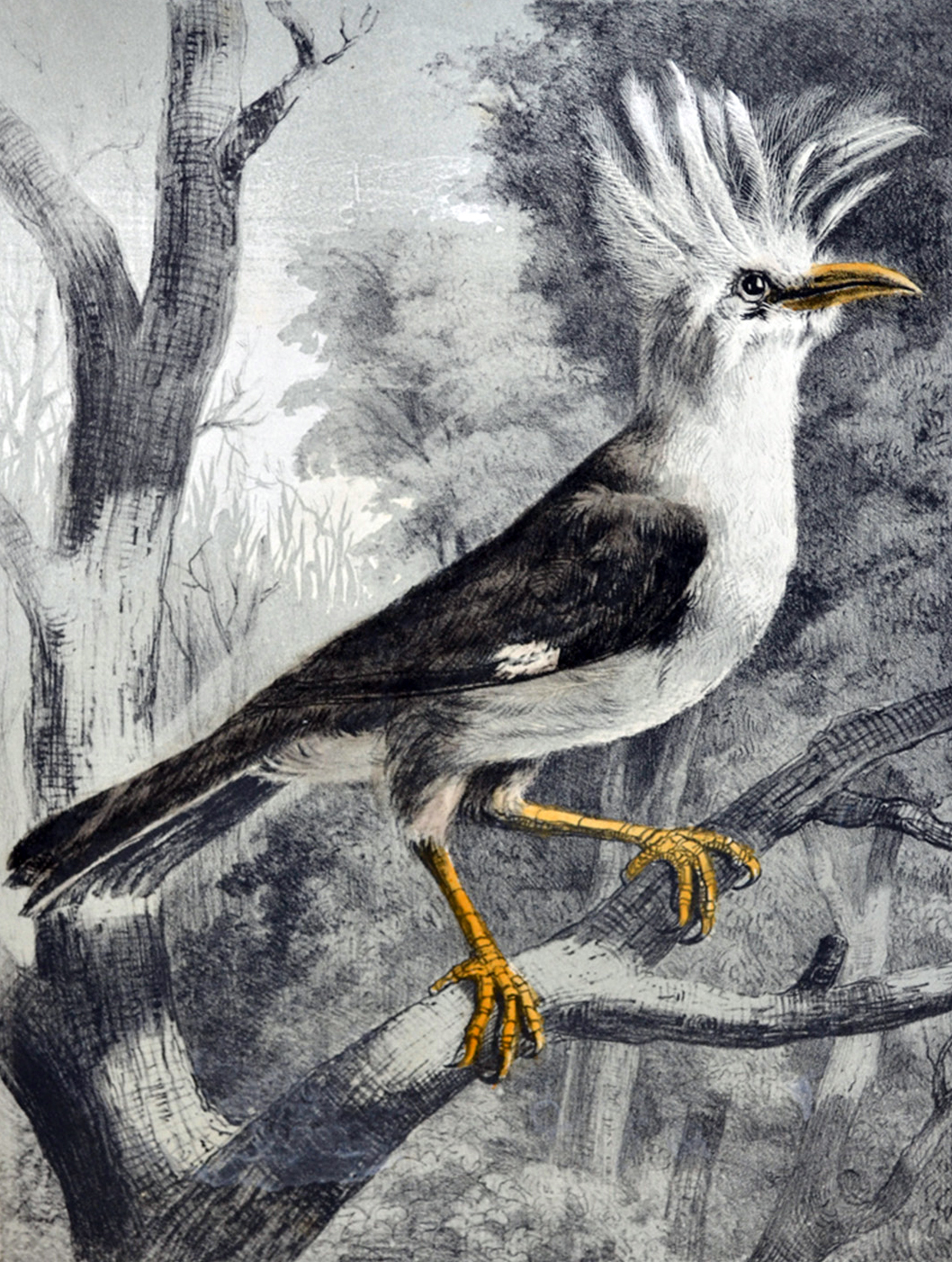
1860s illustration by Albert Roussin

Several causes for the decline and sudden extinction of the hoopoe starling have been proposed, all connected to the activities of humans on Réunion, who it survived alongside for two centuries. An oft-repeated suggestion is that the introduction of the common myna (Acridotheres tristis) led to competition between these two starling species. The myna was introduced to Réunion in 1759 to combat locusts, and became a pest itself, but the hoopoe starling coexisted with the myna for nearly 100 years and they may not have shared habitat. The black rat (Rattus rattus) arrived on Reunion in the 1670s, and the brown rat (Rattus norvegicus) in 1735, multiplying rapidly and threatening agriculture and native species. Like the hoopoe starling, the rats inhabited tree cavities and would have preyed on eggs, juveniles, and nesting birds. During the mid-19th century the Réunion slit-eared skink (Gongylomorphus borbonicus) became extinct because of predation by the introduced wolf snake (Lycodon aulicum), which may have deprived the bird of a significant food source. Hoopoe starlings may have contracted diseases from introduced birds, a factor known to have triggered declines and extinctions in endemic Hawaiian birds. According to British ecologist Anthony S. Cheke, this was the chief cause of the hoopoe starling's extinction; the species had survived for generations despite other threats.

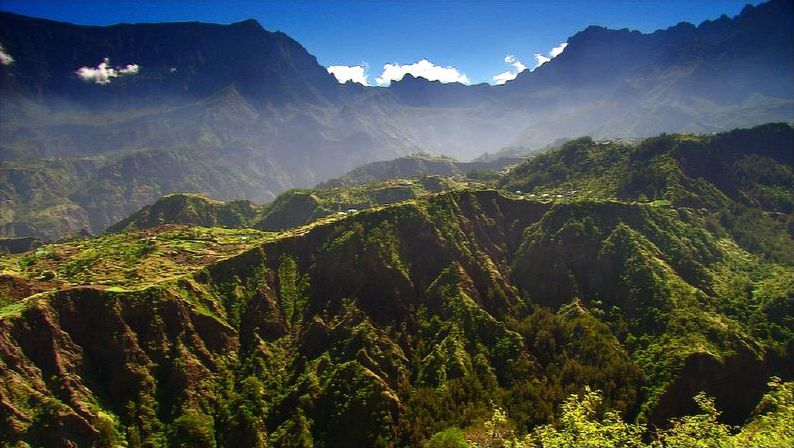
Forested mountain area on Réunion

Beginning in the 1830s, Réunion was deforested for plantations. Former slaves joined white peasants in cultivating pristine areas after slavery was abolished in 1848, and the hoopoe starling was pushed to the edges of its former habitat. According to Hume, over-hunting was the final blow to the species; with forests more accessible, hunting by the rapidly growing human population may have driven the remaining birds to extinction. In 1821, a law mandating the extermination of grain-damaging birds was implemented, and the hoopoe starling had a reputation for damaging crops. During the 1860s, various writers noted that the bird had almost disappeared, but it was probably already extinct by this time; in 1877, Vinson lamented that the last individuals might have been killed by recent forest fires. No attempts to preserve the species in captivity seem to have been made.

The hoopoe starling survived longer than many other extinct Mascarene species, and was the last of the Mascarene starling species to face extinction. The Rodrigues and Mauritius species probably disappeared with the arrival of rats; at least five species of Aplonis starlings have disappeared from the Pacific Islands, with rats also contributing to their extinction. The hoopoe starling may have survived longer because of Réunion's rugged topography and highlands, where it spent much of the year.

== Works cited ==
- Hume, J. P. (2014). "Systematics, morphology, and ecological history of the Mascarene starlings (Aves: Sturnidae) with the description of a new genus and species from Mauritius" (PDF). Zootaxa. 3849 (1): 1–75. doi:10.11646/zootaxa.3849.1.1. PMID 25112426.
