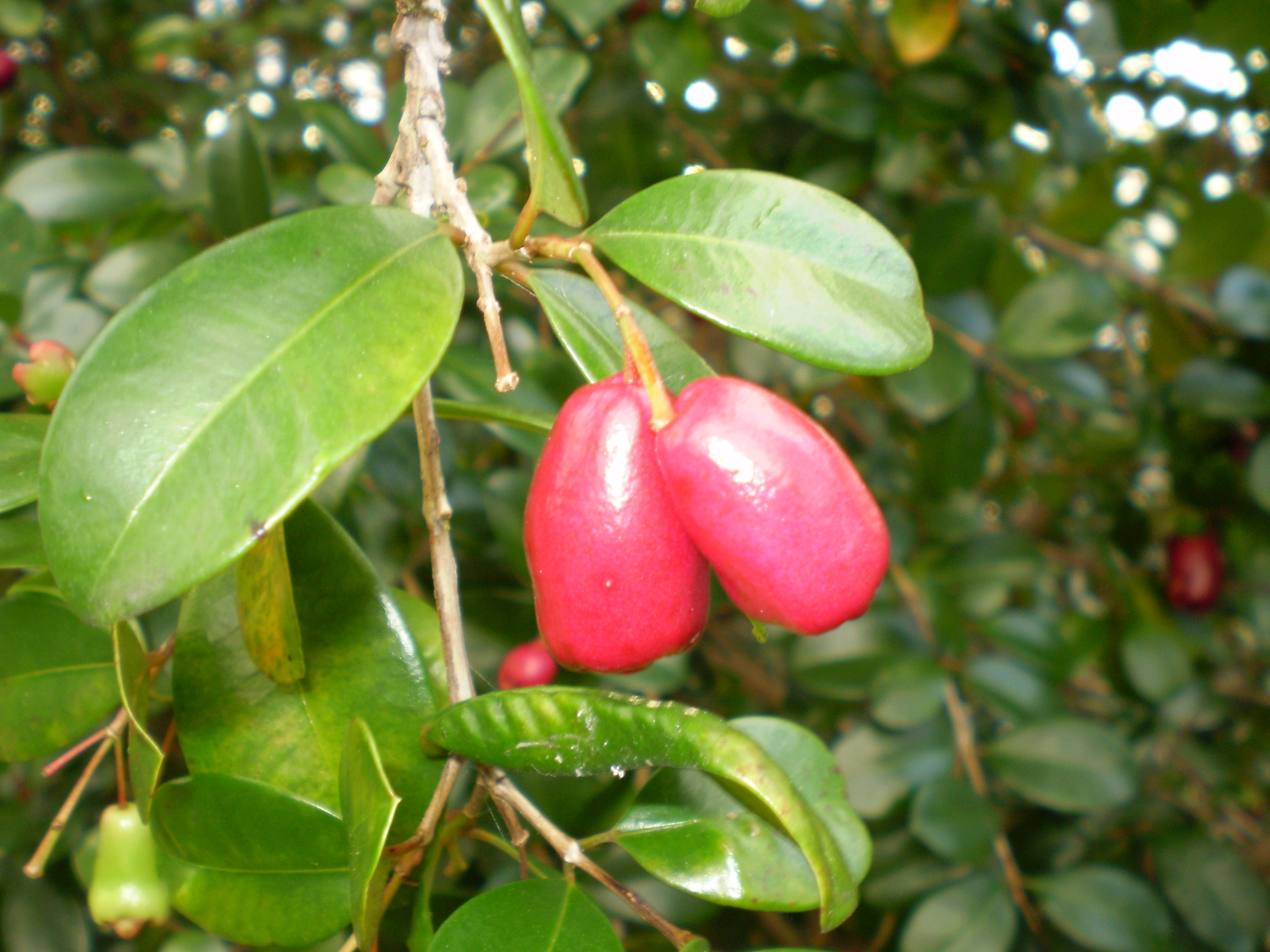

Scientific classification
- Kingdom: Plantae
- Clade: Tracheophytes
- Clade: Angiosperms
- Clade: Eudicots
- Clade: Rosids
- Order: Myrtales
- Family: Myrtaceae
- Genus: Syzygium
- Species: S. australe

Binomial name
- Syzygium australe (H.L.Wendl. ex Link) B.Hyland

Synonyms
- Eugenia australis J.C.Wendl. ex Link; Eugenia myrtifolia Sims nom. illeg.; Eugenia simmondsiae F.M.Bailey; Jambosa australis (J.C.Wendl. ex Link) DC.; Jambosa myrtifolia Heynh.; Jambosa thozetiana F.Muell.; Myrtus australis (J.C.Wendl. ex Link) Spreng.

= Syzygium australe =

Species of tree

Syzygium australe, with many common names that include brush cherry, scrub cherry, creek lilly-pilly, creek satinash, and watergum, is a rainforest tree native to eastern Australia. It can attain a height of up to 35 m with a trunk diameter of 60 cm. In cultivation, this species is usually a small to medium-sized tree with a maximum height of only 18m.

== Description ==
The leaves are opposite, simple, lanceolate from 4–8 cm long. Flowers are white and in clusters. The pink, elongated, edible fruits range from a size of 1.5 to 2.3 centimeters long, and ripen mainly in summer and autumn. The fruit surrounds a small, circular seed. The flavour of the fruit is described as having a refreshing taste, and have a small hint of sourness to them.

This species is commonly confused with magenta cherry and the blue lilly pilly. However, the brush cherry has a paler trunk.

== Distribution ==
The species occurs in coastal regions in Queensland and New South Wales, northwards from Batemans Bay.

== Germination ==
Syzygium australe usually takes about 6 weeks to germinate depending on the temperature and the soil moisture. Ideal temperatures for Brush cherry germination is 18-26 degrees Celsius (65-80 F). The soil needs to be moist, but not waterlogged as this can rot the seed. For successful germination, remove all the flesh from the seed. Plant the seeds about half an inch deep in soil. If planting in a pot, make sure it has good drainage.

== Cultivation and Uses ==
Brush cherry is commonly cultivated in gardens in Eastern Australia, mostly as shorter, shrub-like cultivars such as "Aussie Boomer", "Aussie Compact", "Birdsville", "Bush Christmas", "Minipilly" and "Tiny Trev". These are especially popular as hedges.

The pleasantly sour fruit are also eaten fresh or cooked. The fruit can be used to make jams and jellies.

This species has been adopted by Coffs Harbour City Council as the City's floral emblem.

Brush cherry is used as a subject for bonsai.

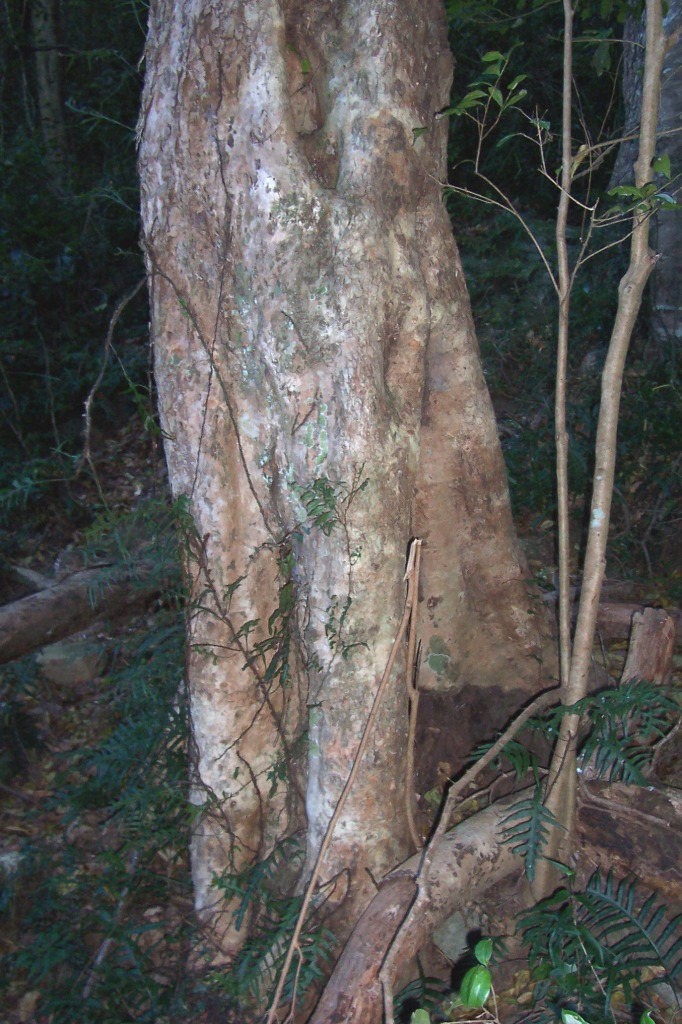
Mature brush cherry at Mount Keira, Illawarra, Australia

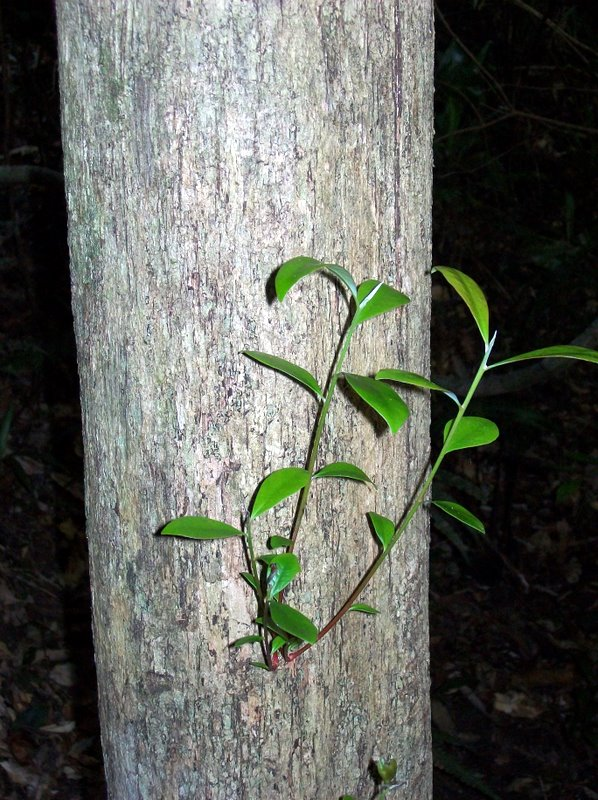
Mature brush cherry at Watagans National Park, Australia

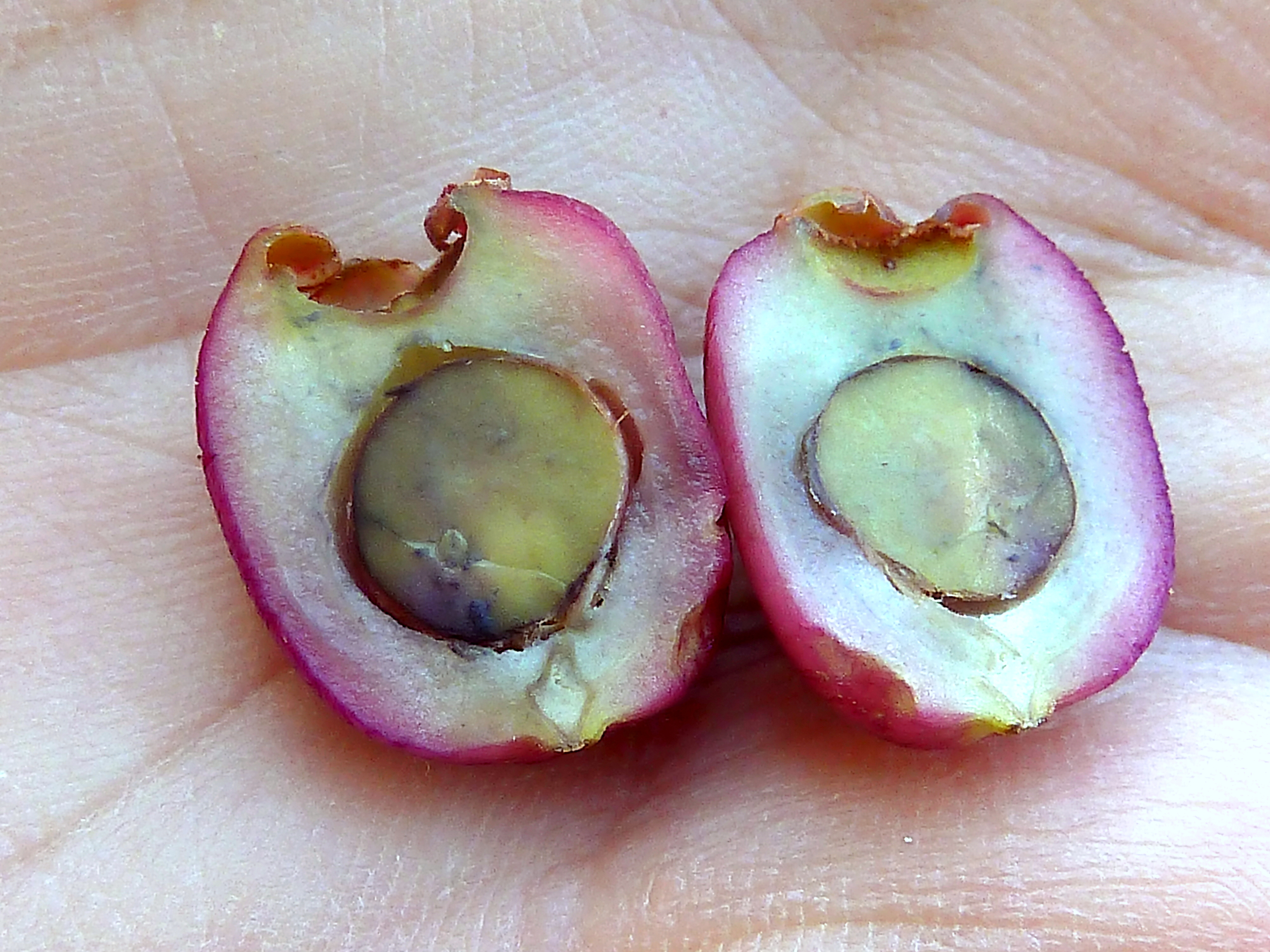
Cross-section of fruit showing the circular seed.

== See also ==
- Austromyrtus dulcis
- Eugenia buxifolia
- Solanum aviculare
- Smilax glyciphylla
