= Pavo, The Indian Journal of Ornithology =

- Language: English
- ISO 4: Find out here

Indexing
- ISSN: 0031-3297

Pavo: The Indian Journal of Ornithology was an Indian journal dedicated to avian studies. It debuted its first volume in March 1963. It was managed as a biennial publication by the Society of Animal Morphologists and Physiologists, operating out of the Faculty of Science's Department of Zoology at M. S. University, Baroda, India. It was founded by R. M. Naik and J. C. George amongst others. It stopped circulation in early 2000s. Initially catering to avian physiologists, morphologists, and taxonomists, the journal later expanded its scope to also publish papers on natural history too.
