= J. C. George =

Indian ornithologist

John Caleekal George (16 June 1921 – 1 April 2005) was an Indian ornithologist and a specialist on avian physiology. He published a major text on avian myology along with Andrew J. Berger in 1966. He was also a founding editor of the ornithology journal Pavo and was a professor and founding head of the zoology department at the University of Baroda from 1950 to 1967.

George was born in Kerala, the son of zoologist C. J. George and Annamma. He went to study medicine but shifted to study zoology and received a PhD from Wilson College, Bombay. He was also a keen sportsman and athlete which made especially interested in the biology of muscles. He worked in Calcutta as a zoologist in the department of anthropology around 1947 and then became the founding head of the department of zoology at the University of Baroda. He was a Fulbright fellow in 1953 and worked at the University of Pennsylvania and the Marine Biological Laboratory. He held the fellowship again in 1961, working at Washington State University. He joined the University of Guelph in 1967 as a professor of zoology and retired in 1986 but serving as professor emeritus. In 1963 he founded The Indian Journal of Ornithology, Pavo along with Ramesh Maganbhai Naik (1931–1991).

George guided research in avian endocrinology, biochemistry of the muscle, thermoregulation, toxicology and migration physiology. He supervised 37 PhD students and 12 MSc students. He published nearly 400 papers including the textbook Avian Myology (1966) along with Andrew Berger. He was a Fellow of the New York Academy of Sciences, a member of the AOU, and served on the committee of the SERC, Canada.

John married Achamma (Molly) Mathew (d. 1999) in 1950. They had two sons and a daughter.
