= R. M. Naik =

Ramesh Maganbhai Naik (2 May 1931 – 8 December 1991) was an Indian ornithologist and a professor of zoology at Saurashtra University, Rajkot. He studied avian physiology and was a co-founder of the journal Pavo along with J. C. George.

Naik received a doctorate for work on avian musculature from the University of Baroda in 1959. He visited Michigan State University in 1961 on a Fulbright Fellowship and returned to India to become a lecturer in zoology at the University of Baroda in 1958. He moved to Saurashtra University, Rajkot, in 1978 and served as a professor for 13 years. He took a special interest in little swifts (Apus affinis) whose biology he studied extensively. He also supervised students who worked on moult and breeding in house sparrows, blue rock pigeon, jungle babbler, the western reef heron, the Indian river tern as well as several colonial waterbirds. He published most of his papers in the journal Pavo which he co-founded. He was among the first to establish an ornithology course in any Indian university. He also supervised theses on other aspects of zoology. He also wrote a textbook on birds for the NCERT in 1972.

Naik was also involved in bird conservation and was an editor for several journals. He died from bronchopneumonia leaving his wife and a son.
