= Philibert Charles Berjeau =

English painter (1845–1927)

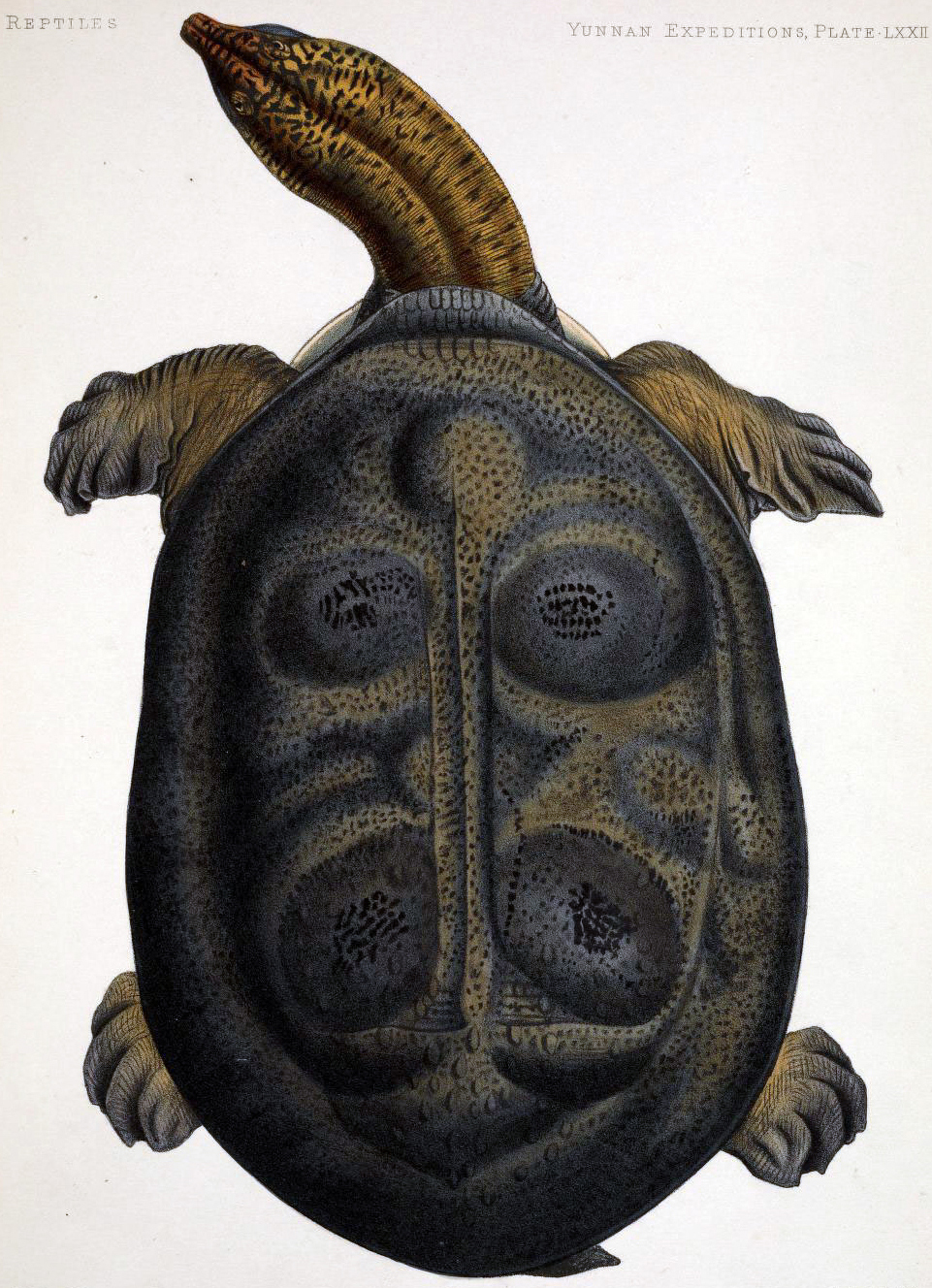
The Burmese peacock softshell turtle, Nilssonia formosa, illustrated by Berjeau, 1878

Philibert Charles Berjeau (10 July 1845 – 1927), sometimes referred to as Ph. Charles Berjeau, was a natural history illustrator and lithographer, active in London in the late Victorian era. His subjects varied widely, including mammals, reptiles and especially birds, as well as fossils.

== Life and work ==
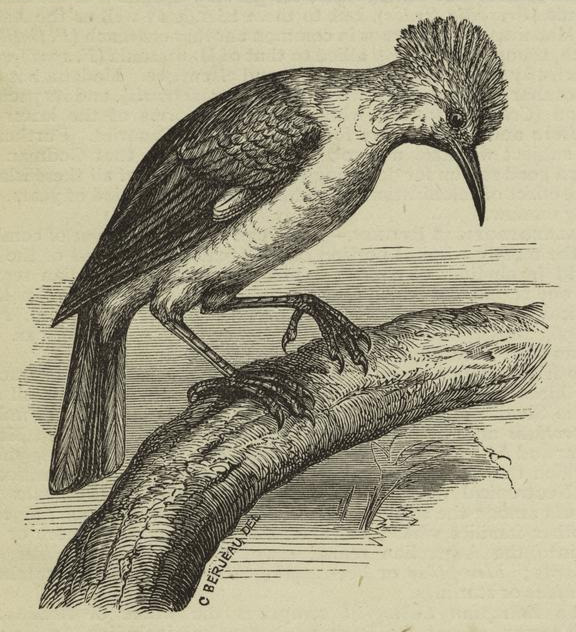
Berjeau's reconstruction of the extinct hoopoe starling of Réunion, Fregilupus varius, 1911

Berjeau was born in Paris on 10 July 1845 to Jean Philibert Berjeau and his wife, Marceline Adolphine (née Bastien). He was the eldest son and had three surviving sisters, Jenny, Marguerite Alexandrine and Lucy C.S., along with a brother Maurice. Following the coup of Napoleon III, who overthrew the French Second Republic, the family was exiled to England in 1850–1, moving to Eastcastle Street in London, W.1, where Lucy and Maurice were born. By 1861 the family had relocated to 50 Georgiana Street in Camden Town, where he was still living in 1871, aged 25. (Note: At the time of the 1861 census (RG9, piece 115, folio 128v, page 20) and the 1871 census (RG10, piece 231, folio 76, page 40) he was living in Georgiana Street, St Pancras, London with his parents; during the former his age was given as 15, and the latter 25.)

Although he had returned to live with his parents by the time of the 1871 census, Berjeau had made his way to France to help defend his native city during the Siege of Paris (1870–71). He wrote a letter to his landlady, Mrs Susanna Crockford (wife of a brewery manager), of 190 Camden Road, London, NW 10, which was sent by balloon post from Paris, dated 17 November 1870, whilst he was serving with the Artillery de la Seine (Garde Nationale), 10th Batterie 4th Piece:

"We are at the eve of a serious engagement before Paris with our pluck severely tried by our isolation from all friends and their apparent want of action on our behalf. We leave resolved to stand up to the last, and the energetic measures adopted by our chiefs give us good hope of success...

I write you these few lines from the guard house of the artillery post where I have 24 hour picket duty before me. Now to pass the time away, I read, write, draw, smoke and talk and I have some capital fellows in my battery. The hours do not seem so long as they might. You can well fancy that nursing the dark night hours and watching by the fireside, my thoughts often wander home to England and not seldom they linger with pleasure on 190 Camden Road. But I am always severely brought back to reality by the sol[itary?] hooter! of some commonalty, travelling along the water or the beat of drums echoing amongst the tall houses..." (Note: See the 1871 census (RG10, piece 237, folio 90v, page 26).)

Berjeau's father was an author, editor and engraver; in 1862 he published Le Bibliophile Illustré, claiming "Texte et Gravures par J. Ph. Berjeau". His book on horses, published in London in 1864, has the list of plates in both English and French.

He followed in his father's footsteps with a skill in engraving. He started to publish his own engravings at an early age (about 17) with a book of drawings of dogs (1863), soon followed by another on horses (1864). In 1866 he collaborated with his father on Beggars, Rogues, and Vagabonds: he made the drawings and his father engraved them.

He made illustrations for the British Museum of Natural History, and for the journal of the Geological Society of London. He made a sketch of the Sumatran rhinoceros which gave birth in Charles William Rice's stables on Commercial Road in December 1872. He worked as an illustrator for Robert Falcon Scott's S.S. Discovery expedition of 1901-1904, and the National Arctic Expedition of 1907-1912. (Note: The dates 1907-1912 appear to include both the Nimrod Expedition led by Ernest Shackleton and the Terra Nova Expedition led fatefully by Captain Scott.)

Berjeau married Fanny Turner in Lambeth during the first quarter of 1874. (Note: Record under Marriages Mar 1874, Lambeth 1d 556.) Fanny survived her husband, living at 5 Beacon Hill, Holloway, Middlesex, as her final home, and died on 13 May 1930 at 77a Highgate Hill, Highgate, Middlesex. (Note: Record in the Probate Calendar for 1930.)

== Works (written and illustrated) ==
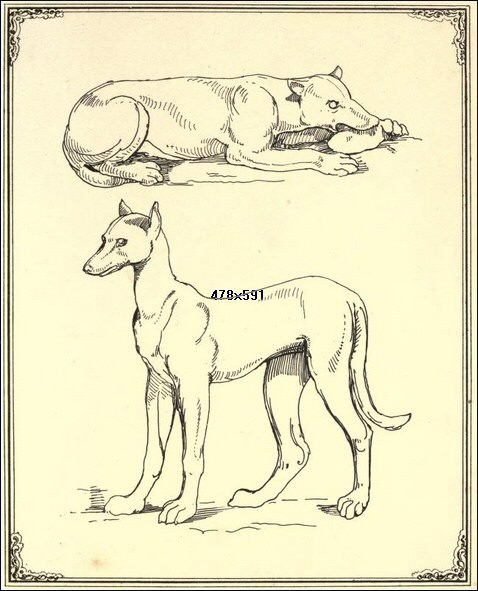
Illustration of Dogs, "Antique from the British Museum", 1863

- The Varieties of Dogs, as They Are Found in Old Sculptures, Pictures, Engravings, and Books: With the Names of the Artists by Whom They Are Represented, Showing How Long Many of the Numerous Breeds Now Existing Have Been Known, London: Dulau & Co, 1863
- The Horses of Antiquity, Middle Ages, and Renaissance: From the Earliest Monuments Down to the XVIth Century, London: Dulau & Co., 1864
- Beggars, Rogues, and Vagabonds. Drawn from life by Charles Berjeau. Engraved by Jean Philibert Berjeau, 1866

== Works illustrated ==
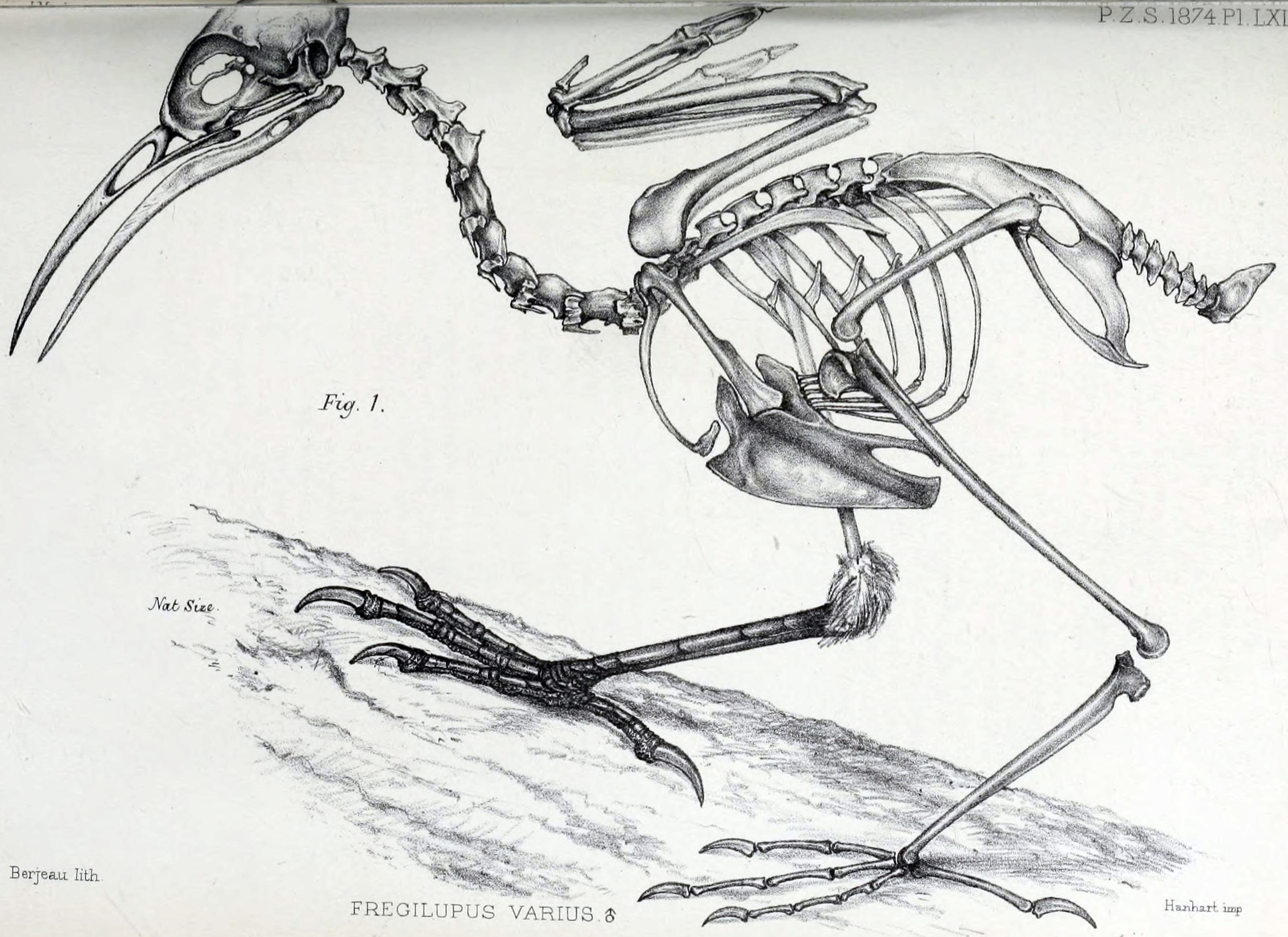
Skeleton of hoopoe starling, Fregilupus varius, 1874

- Lectures on Surgical Anatomy, by John Chiene, 1878
- Tabulate Corals of the Paleozoic, by Henry A. Nicholson], 1879
- Silurian Fossils of Girvan, by Robert Etheridge Jr, 1880
- Catalogue of the Blastoidea, by Philip H. Carpenter, 1886
