= Andrew John Berger =

American ornithologist (1915–1995)

- Born: August 30, 1915; Warren, Ohio
- Died: July 4, 1995 (aged 79); Hawaii
- Education: Oberlin College; University of Michigan
- Spouse: Edith Grace Denniston
- Children: John Denniston Berger; Diana Marie Berger
- Scientific career
- Fields: Ornithology; Zoology
- Workplaces: American Museum of Natural History; University of Michigan Medical School; University of Baroda

Andrew John Berger (August 30, 1915 – July 4, 1995) was an American ornithologist from the American Museum of Natural History.

Berger was born in Warren, Ohio on August 30, 1915. In 1939 he graduated from Oberlin College. After doing fieldwork in game management from 1940 to 1941, he married Edith Grace Denniston in 1942. The couple had two children, John Denniston Berger and Diana Marie Berger. From 1941 to 1946, he served as a commissioned officer in the U.S. Army Air Corps; he continued his military service in the US Air Force Reserve and reached the rank of lieutenant colonel. In 1950 he obtained his PhD in zoology from the University of Michigan. From 1951 through 1963 he taught gross anatomy at the University of Michigan Medical School. He also conducted research on natural history and breeding behavior of the Kirtland's warbler (and other avian species) from the early 1950s through the end of 1963.

In 1964 he accepted an invitation to spend the spring semester as guest professor at the University of Hawaii-Manoa, and in 1965, after spending a year teaching and doing research at the University of Baroda (India) in collaboration with J. C. George, he returned to Hawaii and served two terms as the Chairman of the UH-Manoa Zoology Department.

Berger was a member of the American Ornithologists Union and the Michigan Audubon Society. Although his early interests included the morphology, behavior and classification of birds from the cuckoo family, from 1965 onward he specialized in researching and documenting the history and living conditions of the endemic avian species of the Hawaiian islands. He often spoke out against various state government agencies and related special interest groups when they advocated policies that threatened the survival of rare and endangered species.

His best known and most enduring books are those about Hawaiian avifauna (especially the Hawaiian goose). He also wrote books on avian and human anatomy, and also an article from 1957 where he describes the extinct Bourbon crested starling and its relationship to other bird families.

He died in Hawaii on July 4, 1995.

== Works ==
- 1957 On the anatomy and relationships of Fregilupus varius, an extinct starling from the Mascarene Islands (Bulletin of the AMNH; v. 113, article 3)
- 1964 Elementary Human Anatomy
- 1966 Avian myology
- 1967 Hawaii's birds
- 1971 Fundamentals of Ornithology
- 1971 Bird Study
- 1972 Hawaiian birdlife
- 1976 Fundamentals of Ornithology, 2nd Edition
- 1977 The exotic birds of Hawaii
- 1980 Hawaiian Goose – An Experiment of Conservation
- 1981 Hawaiian Birdlife, 2nd Edition
