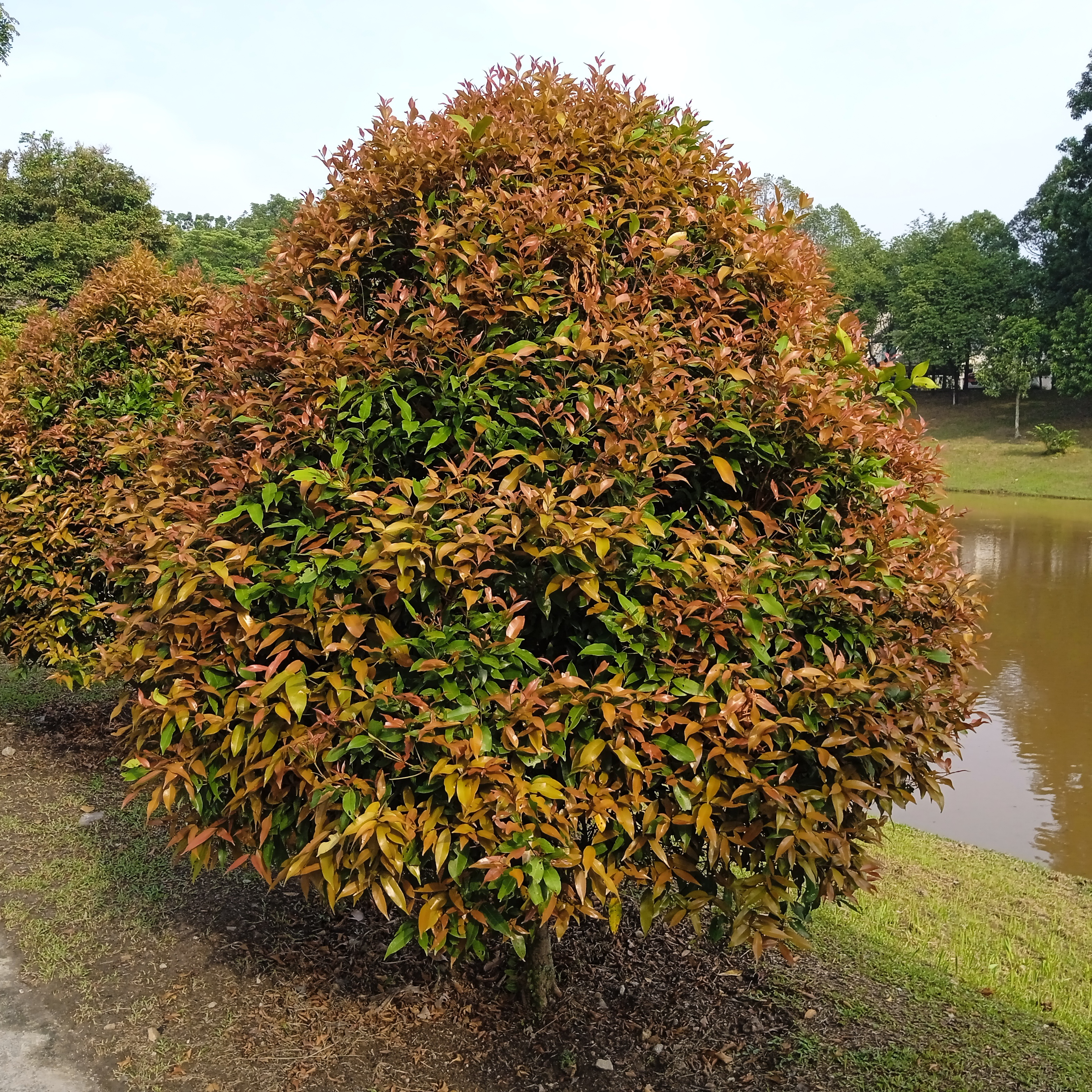
- In a park, Petaling Jaya, Malaysia
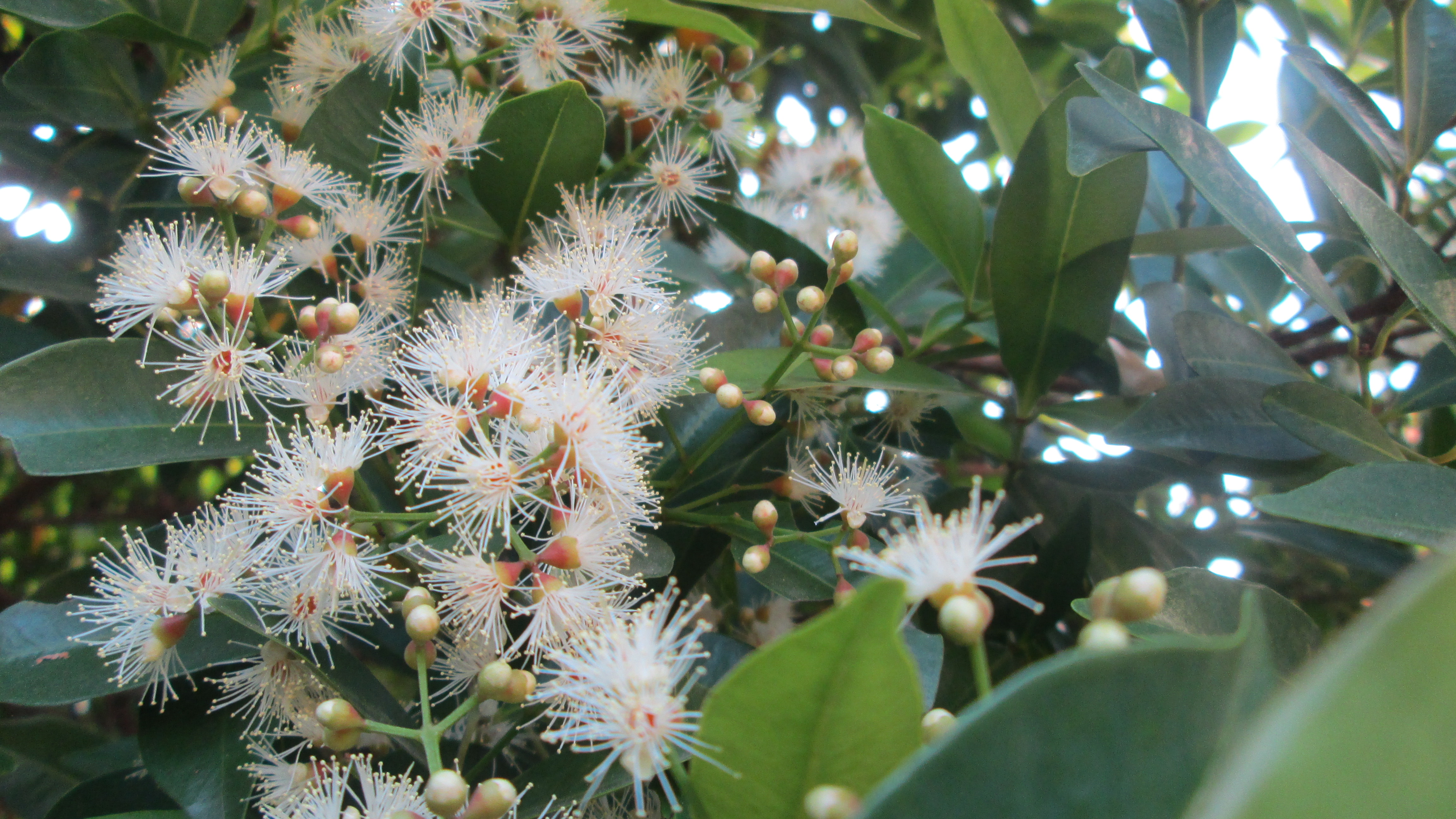
- Flowers

Conservation status
- Least Concern (IUCN 3.1)

Scientific classification
- Kingdom: Plantae
- Clade: Tracheophytes
- Clade: Angiosperms
- Clade: Eudicots
- Clade: Rosids
- Order: Myrtales
- Family: Myrtaceae
- Genus: Syzygium
- Species: S. myrtifolium

Binomial name
- Syzygium myrtifolium Walp.

Synonyms
- List: Eugenia myrtifolia Roxb.; Eugenia oleina Wight; Eugenia parva C.B.Rob.; Eugenia sinubanensis Elmer; Syzygium campanellum Miq.; Syzygium campanulatum Korth.; Syzygium campanulatum var. longistylum Chantar. & J.Parn.; Syzygium sinubanense (Elmer) Diels

= Syzygium myrtifolium =

Species of plant

Syzygium myrtifolium, the red lip or kelat oil, is a species of flowering plant in the family Myrtaceae. It is native to Bangladesh, Myanmar, Thailand, Peninsular Malaysia, Sumatra, Java, Borneo, and the Philippines. A shrub or dense tree from 2 to 20 m (7 to 66 ft) tall, it is typically found in coastal areas, lowlands, and other wet tropical situations. It has found use as a garden, street, and landscaping shrub or tree, due to its colorful young leaves, amenability to pruning (including topiary), and fragrant flowers.

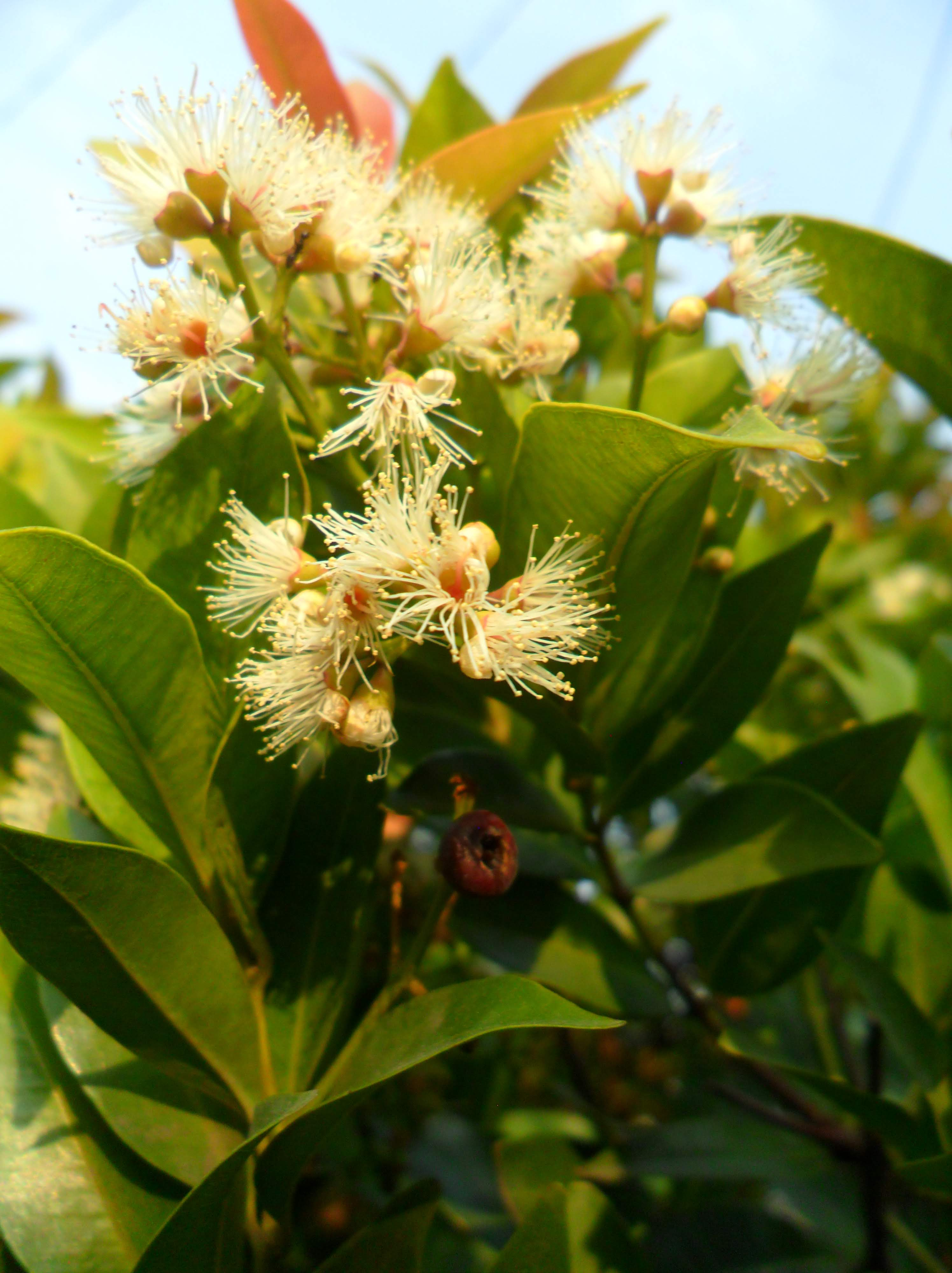
Flowers can be white, cream, or yellow, with a pink cultivar available

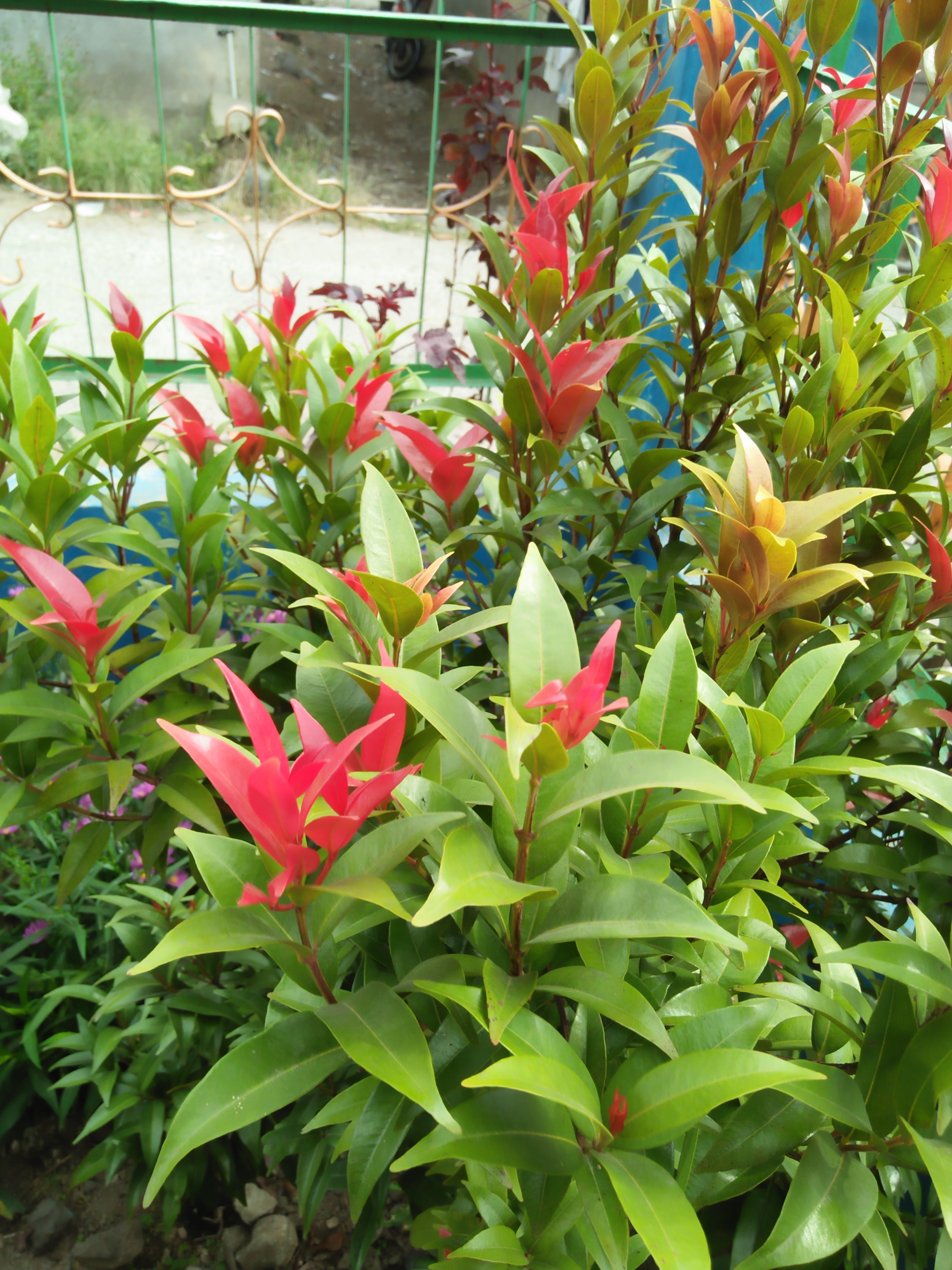
A cultivar with red young leaves

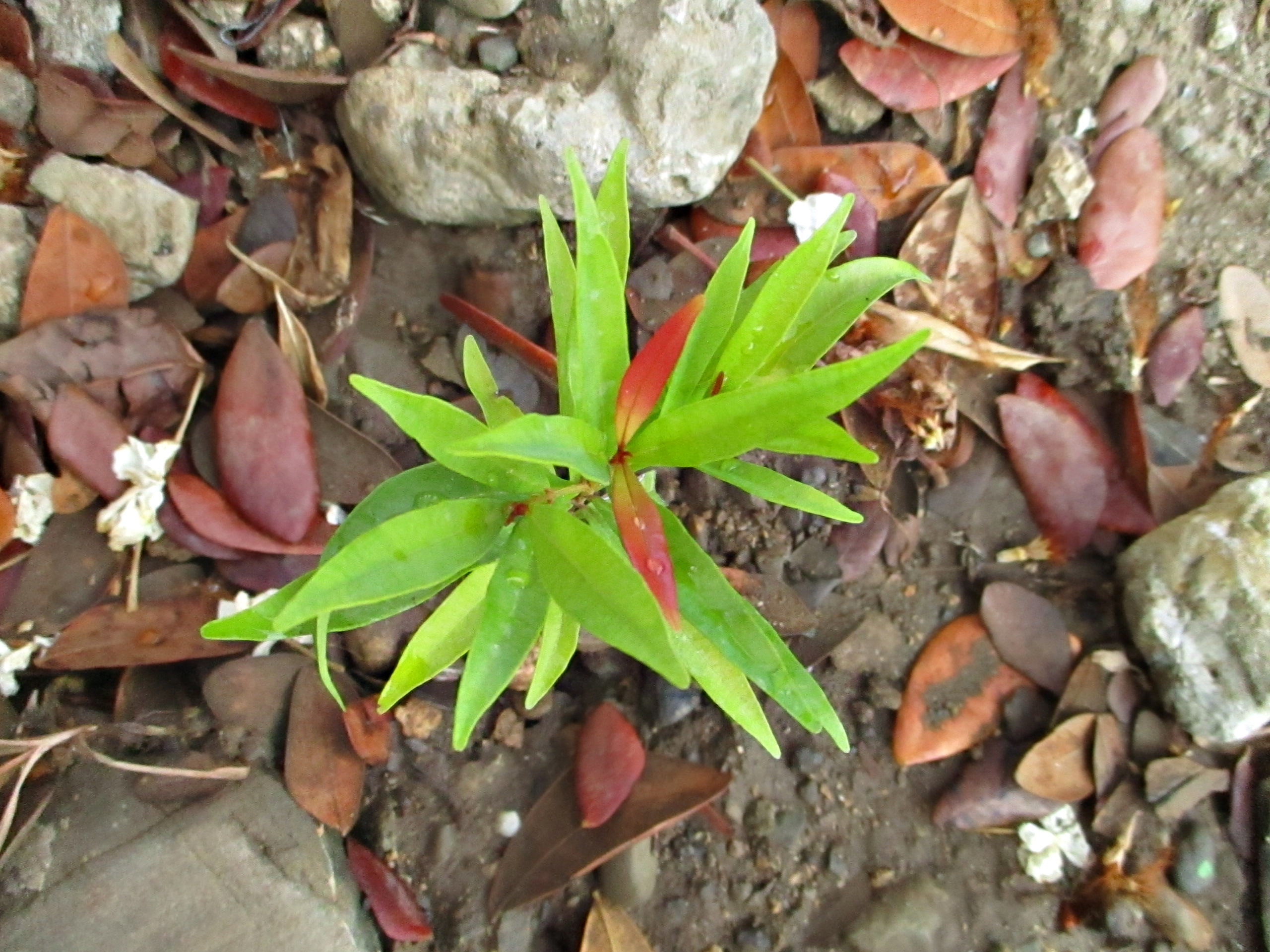
Even as a seedling, younger shoots are red

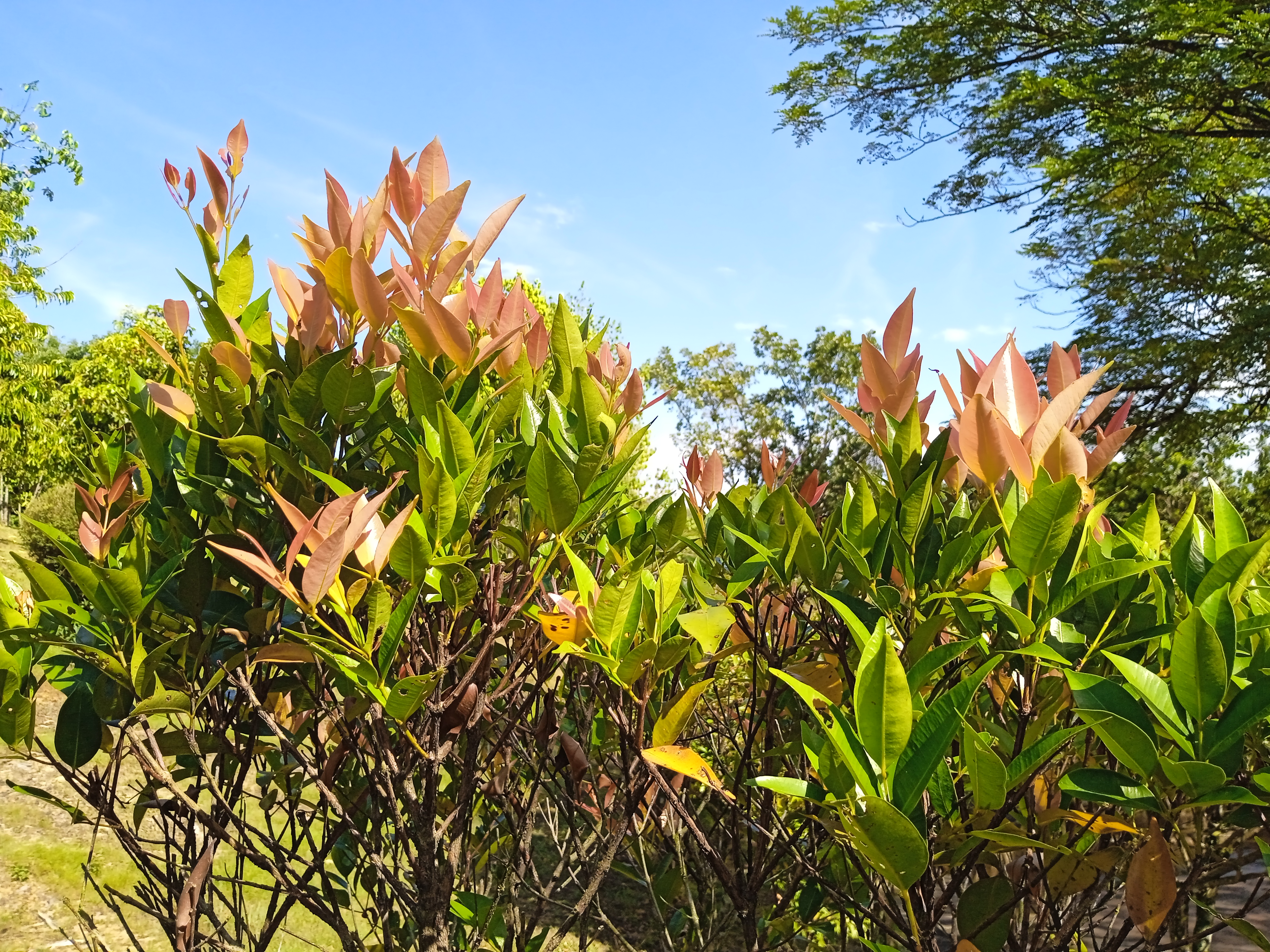
Pink young leaves

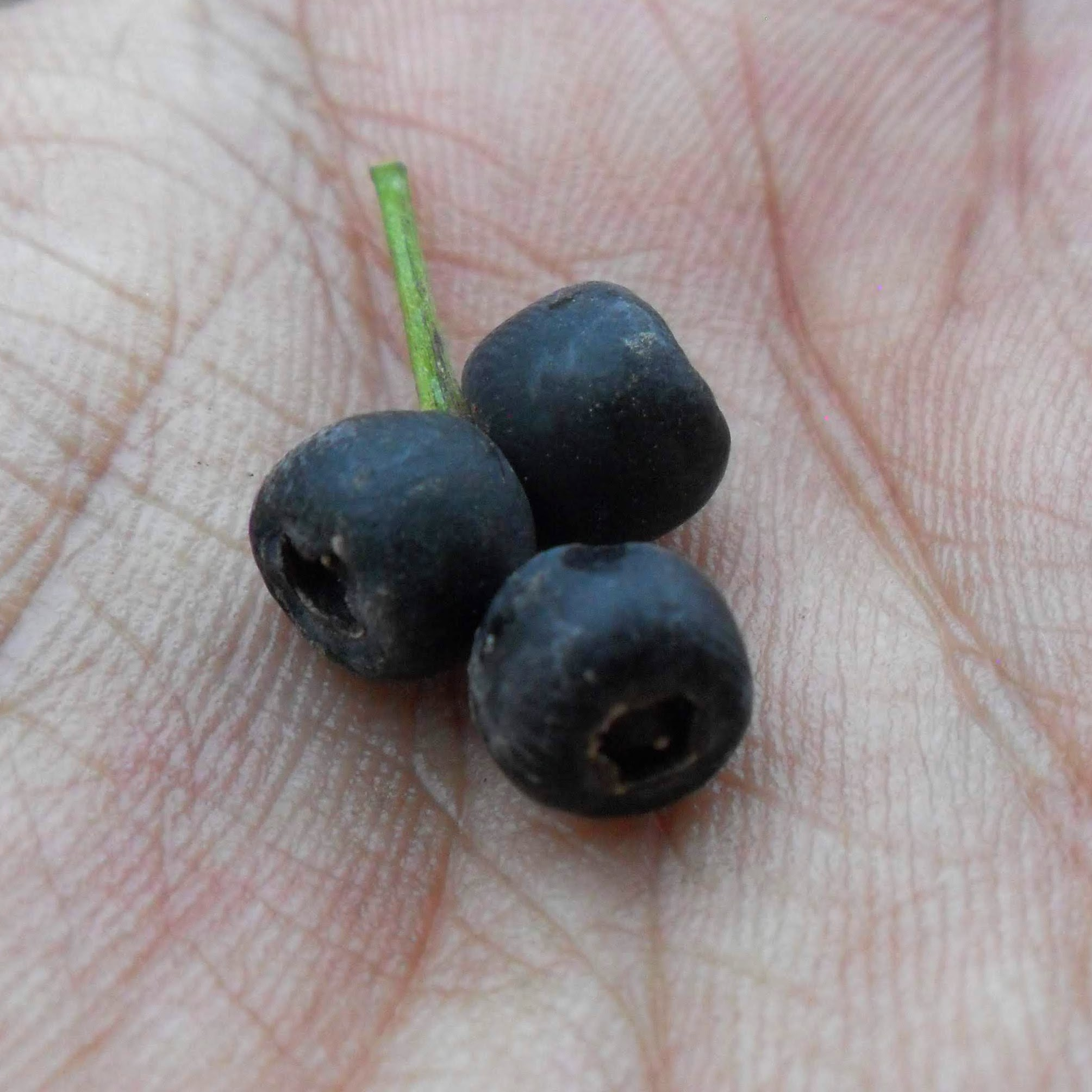
Fruit are black when fully ripe

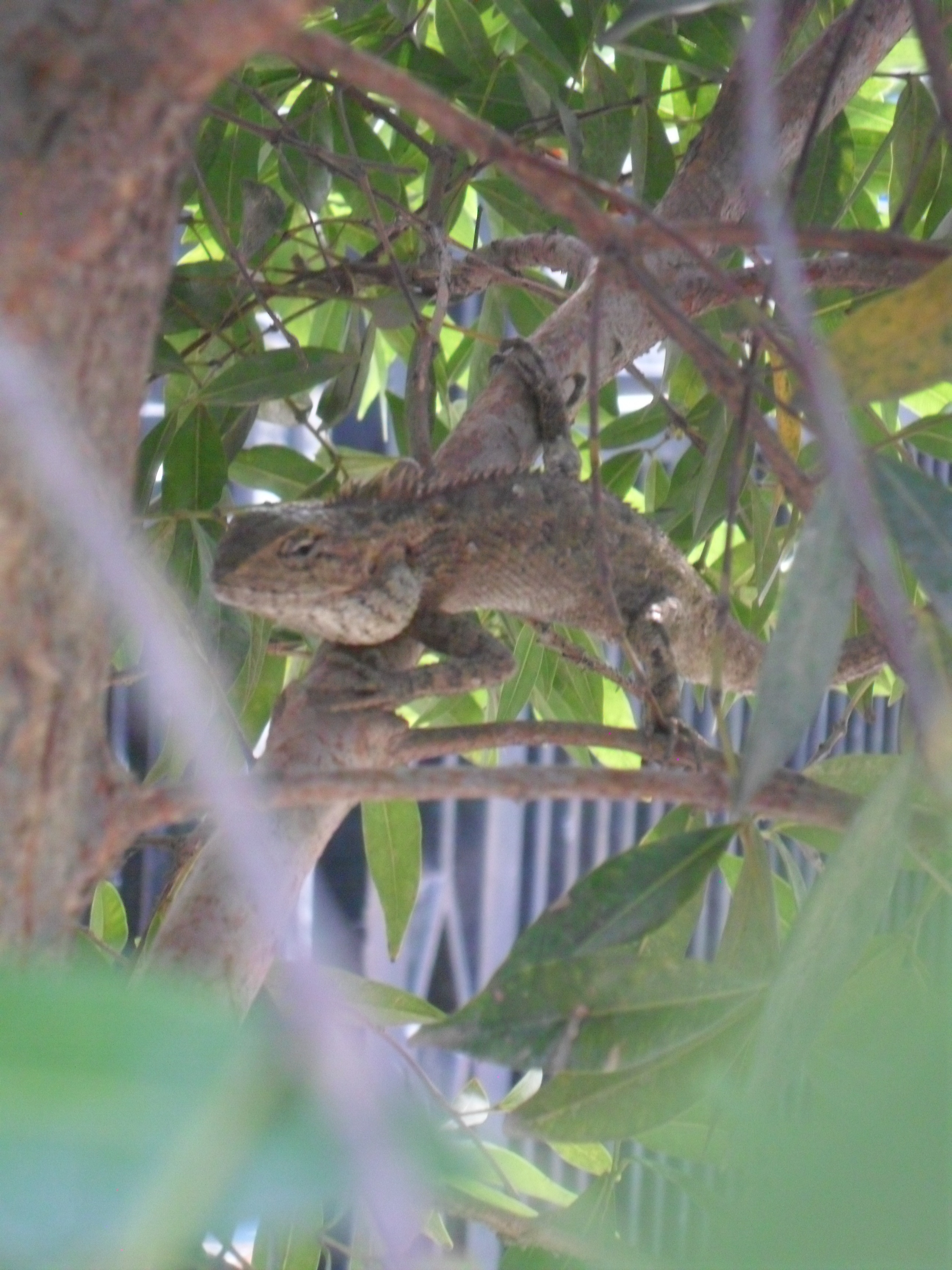
Oriental garden lizard (Calotes versicolor) hiding amongst the branches
