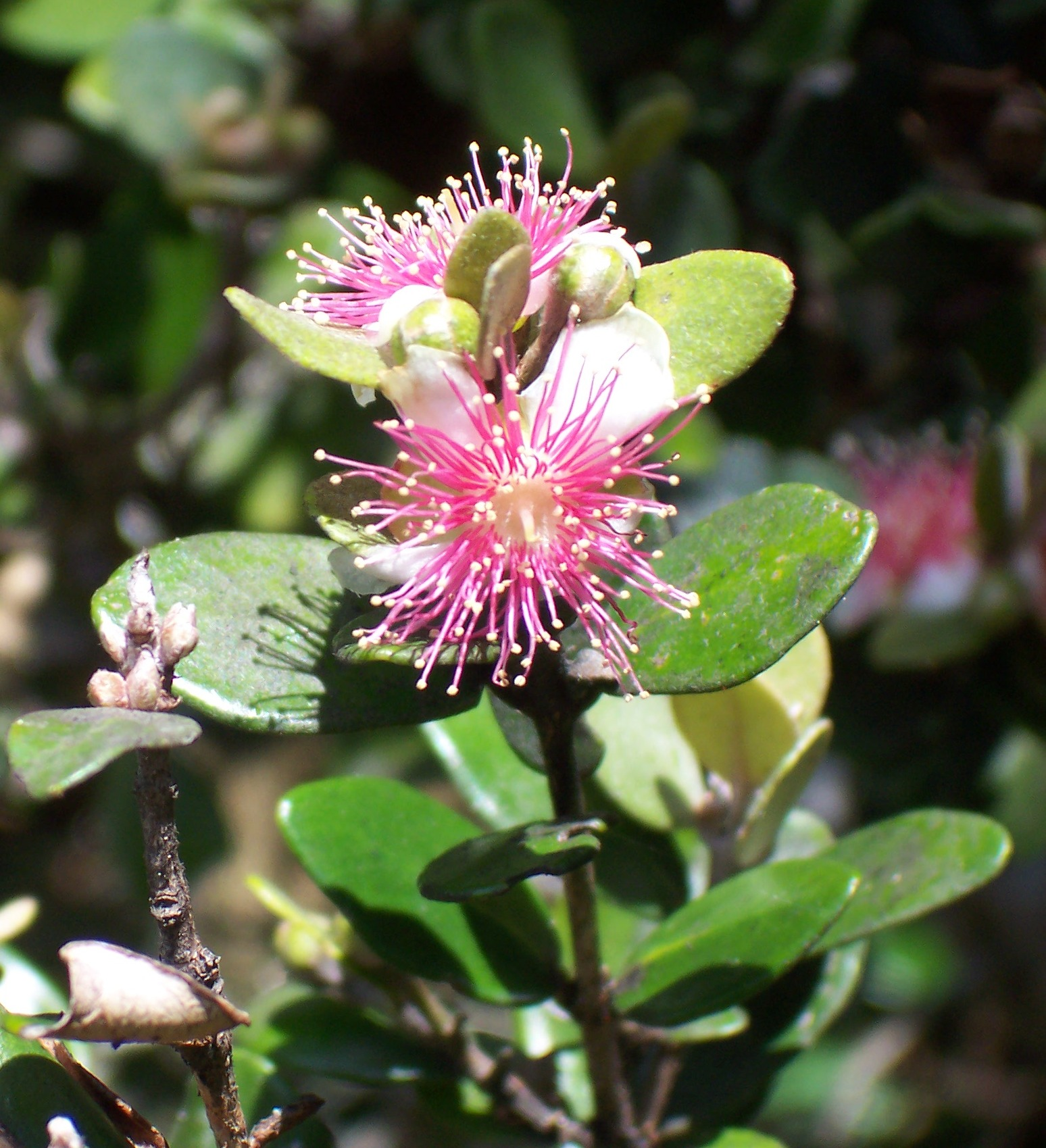

Scientific classification
- Kingdom: Plantae
- Clade: Tracheophytes
- Clade: Angiosperms
- Clade: Eudicots
- Clade: Rosids
- Order: Myrtales
- Family: Myrtaceae
- Genus: Eugenia
- Species: E. buxifolia

Binomial name
- Eugenia buxifolia Lam.

Synonyms
- Eugenia buxifolia var. minor Cordem.; Eugenia buxifolia var. parvifolia Schltdl.; Eugenia coriacea F.Dietr., nom. illeg.; Eugenia heteromorpha Cordem.; Jossinia buxifolia (Lam.) DC.; Jossinia buxifolia var. microphylla Blume; Myrtus borbonica Spreng., nom. illeg.

= Eugenia buxifolia =

Species of flowering plant

Eugenia buxifolia is a species of flowering plant in the family Myrtaceae. It is a shrub or tree endemic to Réunion.
