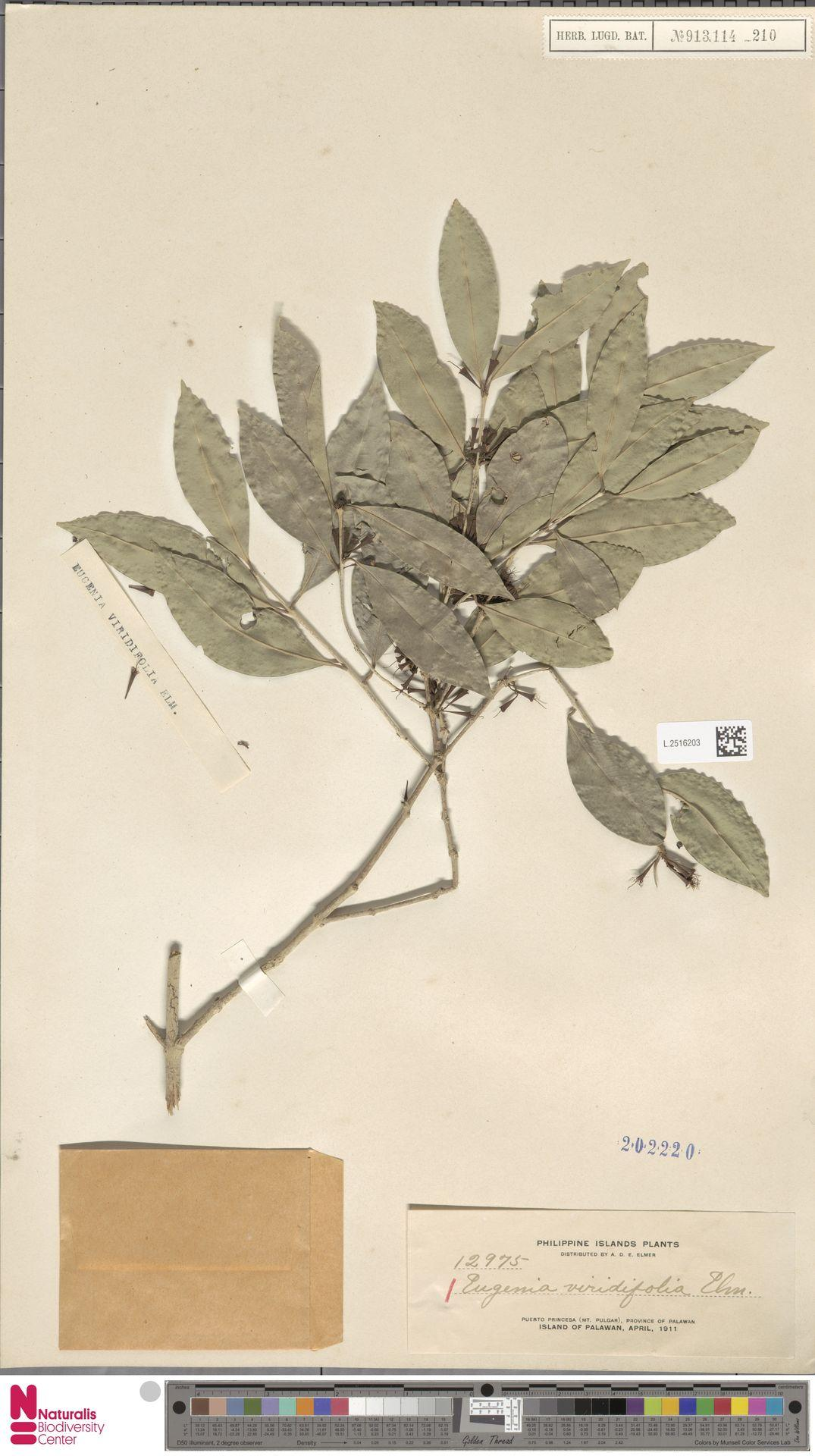
- Herbarium specimen of Szygium claviflorum

Conservation status
- Least Concern (IUCN 3.1)

Scientific classification
- Kingdom: Plantae
- Clade: Tracheophytes
- Clade: Angiosperms
- Clade: Eudicots
- Clade: Rosids
- Order: Myrtales
- Family: Myrtaceae
- Tribe: Syzygieae
- Genus: Syzygium
- Species: S. claviflorum

Binomial name
- Syzygium claviflorum (Roxb.) Wall. ex Steud.

Synonyms
- Acmena claviflora (Roxb.) Walp.; Acmena leptantha Walp.; Acmena wightiana (Wall. ex Wight & Arn.) Walp.; Acmenosperma claviflorum (Roxb.) Kausel; Clavimyrtus claviflora (Roxb.) Blume; Eugenia baviensis Gagnep.; Eugenia clavata (Korth.) Merr.; Eugenia claviflora Roxb.; Eugenia fraseri Ridl.; Eugenia leptalea Craib; Eugenia maingayi Duthie; Eugenia rhododendrifolia Miq.; Eugenia ruminata Koord. & Valeton; Eugenia viridifolia Elmer; Eugenia wightiana (Wall. ex Wight & Arn.) Wight; Jambosa borneensis Miq.; Jambosa clavata Korth.; Jambosa melanocarpa Miq.; Syzygium baviense (Gagnep.) Merr. & L.M.Perry; Syzygium clavatum (Korth.) Merr. & L.M.Perry; Syzygium claviflorum var. excavatum (King) I.M.Turner; Syzygium claviflorum var. glandulosum (King) Chantar. & J.Parn.; Syzygium claviflorum var. maingayi (Duthie) Chantar. & J.Parn.; Syzygium fraseri (Ridl.) Masam.; Syzygium leptanthum (Walp.) Nied.; Syzygium rhododendrifolium (Miq.) Masam.; Syzygium ruminatum (Koord. & Valeton) Amshoff; Syzygium viridifolium (Elmer) Merr. & L.M.Perry; Syzygium wightianum Wall. ex Wight & Arn. (1834)

= Syzygium claviflorum =

Species of flowering plant

Syzygium claviflorum is a tree in the Myrtaceae family. It is native to northern and northeastern Australia and to tropical and subtropical Asia. It is used for timber, as fuel, as human and cattle food, and for dye. Stunted specimens can be found on the top of the plateau of Bokor National Park, Cambodia.

== Description ==
This is an evergreen tree that grows to 10-20m tall in Southeast Asia, 3-15m tall in China. Trees in the north Queensland rainforests grow quickly to a large size, reaching some 180 to 270 cm diameter. The bark is often rather pale, greyish-white to greyish-brown. The leaves have a depressed midrib and a grooved petiole on the upper surface, the blade is 6.5-13.2 by 2.9-5.8 cm in size. Oil dots that are quite variable in size can be seen with a hand-lens. There are about 16-37 lateral veins on each side of the midrib.

The inflorescence bracts are deciduous, and absent at full flower opening, anthesis. In the flowers the calyx tube, hypanthium, and pedicel are around 10-20mm long together, the calyx tube is some 2-5mm in diameter, there are 4-5 rounded, small and inconspicuous calyx lobes, rarely greater than 0.5mm in length. There are 6-8 orbicular petals, when fully grown around 2-3mm in diameter, more or less cohering (largely as the apices of all petals fold into a cylinder at the centre between the staminal filaments). There are up to 20-30 oil dots on the petals. The outer staminal filaments are some 3-8mm long. Anthers are roughly 0.8 by 0.5mm in size, with a terminal gland, reasonably conspicuous. Each locule has about 9-16 ovules. The rather stout style is some 3-8mm long, the same or slightly longer than the stamens.

The edible fruit is of variable shape, from cylindrical to turbinate to pyriform. It is often galled and irregular, it is excavated at the apex and when mature 11-14 by 9-10mm in size. The calyx lobes are not obvious. The pericarp is succulent. Cells radiate from the endocarp to the exocarp. Seeds are about 7-8 by 7-8mm, with the testa apparently absent. The seedlings have about 3 pairs of reduced leaves, cataphylls, before the first pair of true leave appear, these cataphylls are some present between the leaves at later stages. At the tenth leaf stage, conspicuously quadrangled or shortly winged twigs appear, with a lanceolate to ovate leaf, whose apex is acuminate to acute, and a cuneate base. Oil dots are numerous, just visible to the naked eye, clearly visible with a hand-lens. Seeds germinate between 38–95 days.

The wood specific gravity is some 0.72-0.88, wood density some 0.607g/cm^{3}.

Flowering occurs from January to March, June and November in Cambodia and Vietname, while fruiting is in March and April, June and August. In Zhōngguó/China the tree flowers in March and April, fruiting in May and June. The specimens identified in Kerala, India flower and fruit from March to May, while those in the Sikkim Himalaya fruit from August to October.

Discussing the Papuasian subgenus Perkion, Craven distinguishes S. claviflorum in having the bark on the inflorescence branchlet of granular-papillate texture and having a flat staminal disc. Traits used to distinguish S. claviflorum from other Szygium species in Cambodia and Vietnam are the large leaf blade (6-22 by 1.5-7.5 cm); and the long petiole (0.3-0.6 cm).

== Phylogeny ==
This species is in the subgenus Perikion, for which it is the type species. At a lower level it is in a clade with siblings Syzygium apodophyllum, S. corynanthum and Syzygium canicortex.

== Distribution ==
The tree grows on the Australian continent and across Wallacea, Southeast Asia to India and up to southern China. Countries and regions where the plant is native include: Australia (central- and north-eastern Queensland and Cape York; Yermalner/Melville Island, Bathurst Island, Northern Territory); Papua Niugini (eastern New Guinea); Indonesia (West Papua, Aru Islands, Sulawesi, Kalimantan, Jawa); Philippines; Malaysia (Sabah, Sarawak, Peninsular Malaysia); Thailand; Cambodia; Vietnam; Zhōngguó/China (Hainan, Yunnan); Laos; Myanmar; Bangladesh; India (Andaman Islands, Assam, Meghalaya, Sikkim); Bhutan; Eastern Himalaya; Sri Lanka. The species has been reported from southern India, in the southern Western Ghats in the state of Kerala.

== Habitat, ecology ==
In Australia, the tree grows in well developed gallery forest and in lowland and upland rainforest on a variety of sites. It occurs from sea level to 800m altitude. In Southeast Asia it primarily occurs in dense lowland forests. In Zhōngguó/China the tree is found in dense or open angiosperm evergreen forest in valley and in the hills, with an elevation range of below 100m to 1300m.

In North Queensland rainforests the taxa grows best on basic volcanic/basalt derived soils.

Growing in New Guinea and the Aru Islands, the species occurs in a wide variety of communities: oak forest, rainforest, swamp forest, mangrove edges, riparian forest edges, riverine forest, lowland hill forest, tall open forest, forest on low stony hills, and oak-beech forest; at elevations from sea level to 2750m.

The populations in Cambodia and Vietnam are found in lowland to montane forests, including primary, secondary and beach forest, up to 1050m elevation.

On top of the plateau of Bokor National Park (Kampot Province, Cambodia, at some 1045m.a.s.l., this species grows as a shrub or small tree (2-4m tall) amongst a sclerophyllous stunted forest community on rocky soils. It is also reported as common in open bogs at between 930 and 1043m.

In the Chemunji Hills, Kerala it is common along streams in evergreen forest, while in Ponmudi, Kerala, it is common in exposed rocky areas of evergreen forests. At both localities associated species are Polyalthia malabarica, Syzygium gardneri, S. lanceolatum, S. munroi, Elaeocarpus serratus var. weibelii, and Aporosa acuminata.

== Conservation ==
The "Least Concern" rating by the IUCN (see infobox above) is a result of the species having a large population, a very wide distribution and no current or future major threats have been identified. However the IUCN notes that there is "[c]ontinuing decline in area, extent and/or quality of habitat." However in the Northern Territory, Australia, the plant is listed by the government as "Near Threatened", as the distribution of the tree is limited to Yermalner/Melville Island and Bathurst Island.

== Vernacular names ==
- pri:ng ach kânndaôr/prinh ach kanndaor (ach kânndaôr="mouse droppings", alluding to the small fruits), pri:ng ach' romèang/prinh ach romeang (Khmer)
- tram trang (Vietnamese)
- 棒花蒲桃, bang hua pu tao (Standard Chinese)
- harejamun, (Sikkim).
- grey satinash, satinash, trumpet, trumpet satinash, watergum (Australian English, note: grey satinash, satinash and watergum are names also applied to other taxa)

== Uses ==
The wood is a useful structural timber, and in Australia is marketed under the name grey satinash. People who live in the Bung Khong Long Non-Hunting Area (Nong Khai Province, Thailand) use the bark for dyeing nets (to enhance their strength) and the fruit as cattle feed. In Cambodia the fruit are eaten and the wood is good firewood for heating. In the Chittagong region of Myanmar and in Kerala and the Sikkim Himalaya, the fruit are eaten locally.

== History ==
The species was described in 1841 by the German physician and botanist Ernst Gottlieb von Steudel (1783-1841), whose main work was on grasses. He published the description in the second edition of his work Nomenclator botanicus (1840-1). He was building on others work. Firstly that of Nathaniel Wallich (1786-1854), the Danmark-born botanist who worked in India, who did not quite validly describe the taxa. Before that, William Roxburgh (1751-1815), a Scottish surgeon and botanist who worked in India, had described the basionym taxa, that which this present accepted taxa is based: Eugenia claviflora Roxb. This was described in 1832 in Roxburgh's posthumously published work Flora Indica; or, Descriptions of Indian Plants.
