= Syzygium skiophilum =

Conservation status
- Least Concern (IUCN 3.1)

Scientific classification
- Kingdom: Plantae
- Clade: Tracheophytes
- Clade: Angiosperms
- Clade: Eudicots
- Clade: Rosids
- Order: Myrtales
- Family: Myrtaceae
- Genus: Syzygium
- Species: S. skiophilum

Binomial name
- Syzygium skiophilum (Duthie) Airy Shaw

Synonyms
- Aphanomyrtus camphorata Valeton; Aphanomyrtus skiophila (Duthie) Valeton; Eugenia skiophila Duthie; Pseudoeugenia perakiana Scort.; Syzygium filicaudum Merr. & L.M.Perry

Species of tree

Syzygium skiophilum is a species of plant in the family Myrtaceae. It is a tree native to Borneo, Peninsular Malaysia and Thailand.
