= Syzygium conglomeratum =

Conservation status
- Least Concern (IUCN 3.1)

Scientific classification
- Kingdom: Plantae
- Clade: Tracheophytes
- Clade: Angiosperms
- Clade: Eudicots
- Clade: Rosids
- Order: Myrtales
- Family: Myrtaceae
- Genus: Syzygium
- Species: S. conglomeratum

Binomial name
- Syzygium conglomeratum (Duthie) I.M.Turner

Synonyms
- Eugenia conglomerata Duthie; Eugenia conglomerata var. paniculata M.R.Hend.; Syzygium conglomeratum var. paniculatum (M.R.Hend.) I.M.Turner

Species of flowering plant

Syzygium conglomeratum is a species of flowering plant from the family Myrtaceae. It is a tree native to Peninsular Malaysia, Singapore, and Sumatra.
