= Syzygium pendens =

Conservation status
- Least Concern (IUCN 2.3)

Scientific classification
- Kingdom: Plantae
- Clade: Tracheophytes
- Clade: Angiosperms
- Clade: Eudicots
- Clade: Rosids
- Order: Myrtales
- Family: Myrtaceae
- Genus: Syzygium
- Species: S. pendens

Binomial name
- Syzygium pendens (Duthie) I.M.Turner

Synonyms
- Eugenia pendens Duthie

Species of flowering plant

Syzygium pendens is a species of flowering plant in the family Myrtaceae. It is a tree native to Borneo, Peninsular Malaysia, and Singapore.
