= Eugenia oblongifolia =

Eugenia oblongifolia can refer to:

- Eugenia oblongifolia (O.Berg) Arechav., a synonym of Eugenia uniflora
- Eugenia oblongifolia Duthie, a synonym of Syzygium maingayi
- Eugenia oblongifolia (Sagot) Nied. ex T. Durand & B.D. Jacks., a synonym of Eugenia neograndifolia
