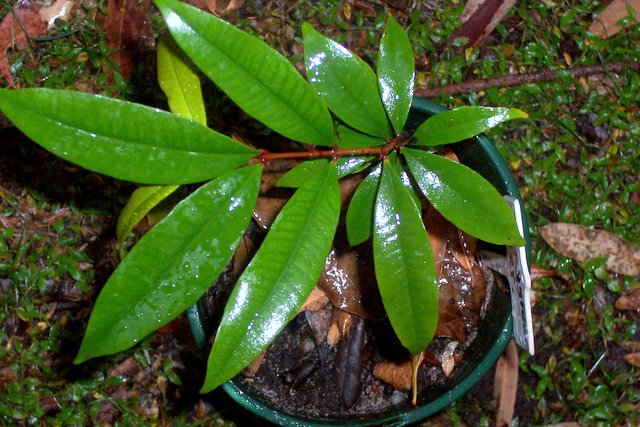
- Mulgrave satinash - seedling

Scientific classification
- Kingdom: Plantae
- Clade: Tracheophytes
- Clade: Angiosperms
- Clade: Eudicots
- Clade: Rosids
- Order: Myrtales
- Family: Myrtaceae
- Genus: Syzygium
- Species: S. xerampelinum

Binomial name
- Syzygium xerampelinum B.Hyland

= Syzygium xerampelinum =

Mulgrave satinash

Species of plant

Syzygium xerampelinum, known as the Mulgrave satinash, is a rare rainforest tree of tropical Queensland, Australia. The bark and fruit are similar to the often cultivated magenta cherry.
