= Syzygium quadribracteatum =

Conservation status
- Least Concern (IUCN 2.3)

Scientific classification
- Kingdom: Plantae
- Clade: Tracheophytes
- Clade: Angiosperms
- Clade: Eudicots
- Clade: Rosids
- Order: Myrtales
- Family: Myrtaceae
- Genus: Syzygium
- Species: S. quadribracteatum

Binomial name
- Syzygium quadribracteatum (M.R.Hend.) I.M.Turner

Synonyms
- Eugenia quadribracteata M.R.Hend.

Species of flowering plant

Syzygium quadribracteatum is a species of plant in the family Myrtaceae. It is endemic to Peninsular Malaysia.
