= Syzygium ampliflorum =

Conservation status
- Critically Endangered (IUCN 2.3)

Scientific classification
- Kingdom: Plantae
- Clade: Tracheophytes
- Clade: Angiosperms
- Clade: Eudicots
- Clade: Rosids
- Order: Myrtales
- Family: Myrtaceae
- Genus: Syzygium
- Species: S. ampliflorum

Binomial name
- Syzygium ampliflorum (Koord. & Valeton) Amshoff

Synonyms
- Eugenia ampliflora Koord. & Valeton; Clavimyrtus firma Blume; Eugenia firma (Blume) Koord. & Valeton; Jambosa firma (Blume) Miq.

Species of tree

Syzygium ampliflorum is a species of plant in the family Myrtaceae. It is a tree endemic to Java in Indonesia. It is a critically endangered species threatened by habitat loss.
