= Syzygium prainianum =

Conservation status
- Least Concern (IUCN 2.3)

Scientific classification
- Kingdom: Plantae
- Clade: Tracheophytes
- Clade: Angiosperms
- Clade: Eudicots
- Clade: Rosids
- Order: Myrtales
- Family: Myrtaceae
- Genus: Syzygium
- Species: S. prainianum

Binomial name
- Syzygium prainianum (King) Chantar. & J.Parn.

Subspecies
- Syzygium prainianum subsp. minor Chantar. & J.Parn.; Syzygium prainianum subsp. prainianum

Synonyms
- Eugenia prainiana King; synonyms of subsp. prainianum: Eugenia pearsoniana King; Syzygium pearsonianum (King) I.M.Turner

Species of tree

Syzygium prainianum is a species of flowering plant in the family Myrtaceae. It is a tree native to Borneo, Peninsular Malaysia, and Peninsular Thailand.
