= Syzygium courtallense =

Conservation status
- Critically Endangered (IUCN 3.1)

Scientific classification
- Kingdom: Plantae
- Clade: Tracheophytes
- Clade: Angiosperms
- Clade: Eudicots
- Clade: Rosids
- Order: Myrtales
- Family: Myrtaceae
- Genus: Syzygium
- Species: S. courtallense

Binomial name
- Syzygium courtallense (Gamble) Alston

Synonyms
- Jambosa courtallensis Gamble

Species of plant

Syzygium courtallense is a species of plant in the family Myrtaceae. It is tree that grows in the wet tropical biomes of southwest India (Tamil Nadu) and Sri Lanka. It is threatened by habitat loss.
