= Syzygium occidentale =

Conservation status
- Endangered (IUCN 3.1)

Scientific classification
- Kingdom: Plantae
- Clade: Tracheophytes
- Clade: Angiosperms
- Clade: Eudicots
- Clade: Rosids
- Order: Myrtales
- Family: Myrtaceae
- Genus: Syzygium
- Species: S. occidentale

Binomial name
- Syzygium occidentale (Bourd.) Gandhi

Synonyms
- Eugenia occidentalis Bourd.; Jambosa occidentalis (Bourd.) Gamble

Species of flowering plant

Syzygium occidentale is a species of flowering plant in the family Myrtaceae. It is a tree native to the southern Western Ghats of Karnataka and Kerala of southwestern India. It is a small evergreen tree which grows in evergreen riparian forest from 60 to 750 metres elevation.
