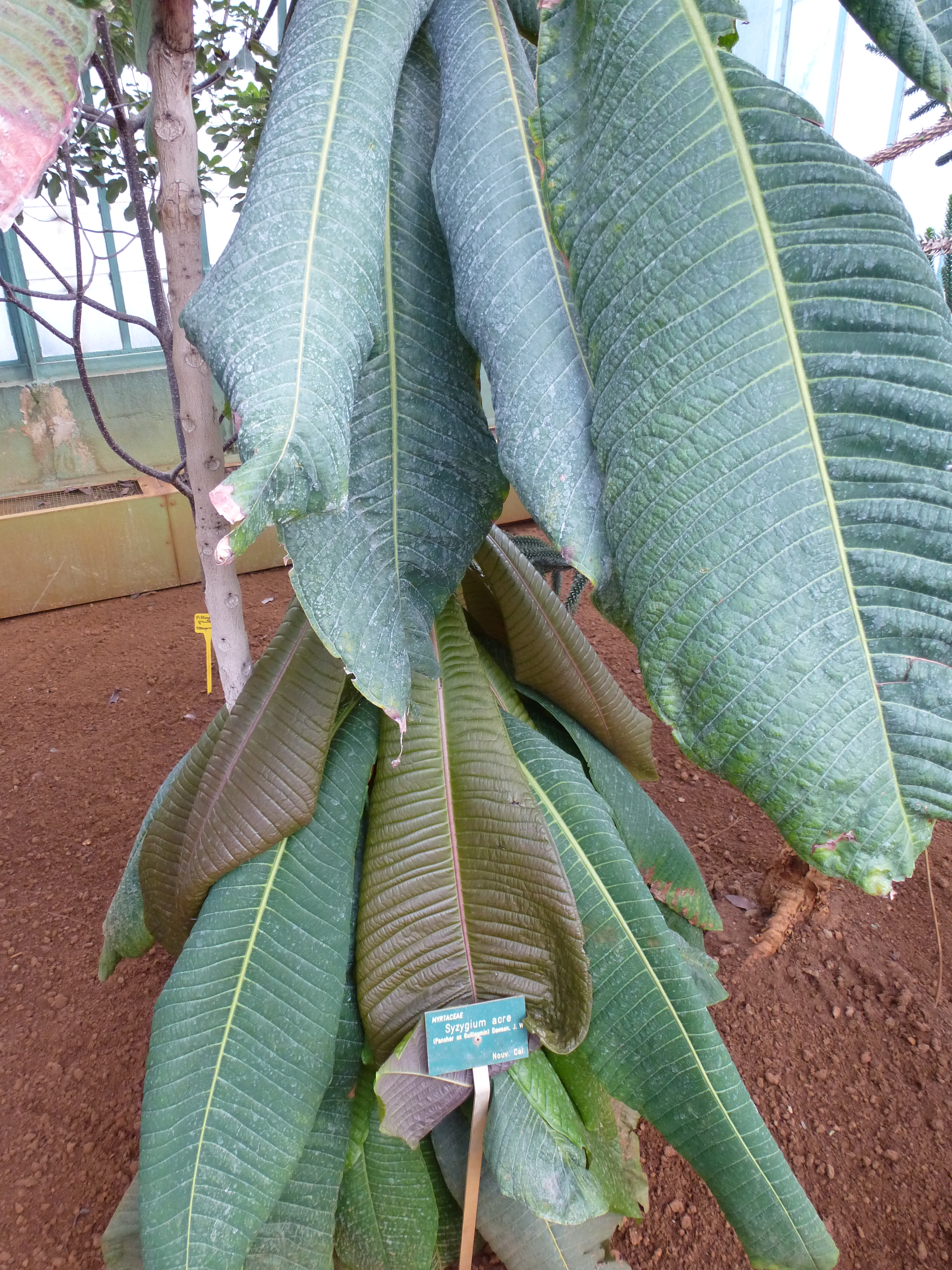

Conservation status
- Endangered (IUCN 3.1)

Scientific classification
- Kingdom: Plantae
- Clade: Tracheophytes
- Clade: Angiosperms
- Clade: Eudicots
- Clade: Rosids
- Order: Myrtales
- Family: Myrtaceae
- Genus: Syzygium
- Species: S. acre

Binomial name
- Syzygium acre (Pancher ex Guillaumin) J.W.Dawson

Synonyms
- Jambosa acris Pancher ex Guillaumin

= Syzygium acre =

Rainforest tree of New Caledonia

Syzygium acre is an understory rainforest tree in the family Myrtaceae that is endemic to New Caledonia.

== Description ==
Syzygium acre is a pachycaul "palmoid" tree which grows up to 10 m (33 ft) in height. It usually has a single trunk, but may have two or three vertical branches with a rosette of enormous leaves at the top of each, with each leaf growing to 1.5 m (4 ft 11 in) in length by 38 cm (15 in) wide. The young leaves and the flowers are pinkish; the flowers are cauliflorous (i.e. growing directly from the trunk) and are about 5 cm (2 in) long, and pendant. The fruit is dark purple and fibrous.

== Conservation status ==
As of February 2025, this species is regarded as endangered by the IUCN due to the species being restricted to a very small area in Grande Terre (the main island of New Caledonia), and threats to its habitat imposed by bushfires and feral pigs. The current population size is not known.
