= Syzygium turbinatum =

Conservation status
- Endangered (IUCN 2.3)

Scientific classification
- Kingdom: Plantae
- Clade: Tracheophytes
- Clade: Angiosperms
- Clade: Eudicots
- Clade: Rosids
- Order: Myrtales
- Family: Myrtaceae
- Genus: Syzygium
- Species: S. turbinatum

Binomial name
- Syzygium turbinatum Alston

Species of flowering plant

Syzygium turbinatum is a species of flowering plant in the family Myrtaceae. It is a tree endemic to Sri Lanka.
