= Syzygium kemamanense =

Conservation status
- Least Concern (IUCN 2.3)

Scientific classification
- Kingdom: Plantae
- Clade: Embryophytes
- Clade: Tracheophytes
- Clade: Angiosperms
- Clade: Eudicots
- Clade: Rosids
- Order: Myrtales
- Family: Myrtaceae
- Genus: Syzygium
- Species: S. kemamanense

Binomial name
- Syzygium kemamanense (M.R.Hend.) I.M.Turner

Synonyms
- Eugenia kemamanensis M.R.Hend.

Species of flowering plant

Syzygium kemamanense is a species of plant in the family Myrtaceae. It is endemic to Peninsular Malaysia.
