= Syzygium stapfianum =

Conservation status
- Least Concern (IUCN 2.3)

Scientific classification
- Kingdom: Plantae
- Clade: Tracheophytes
- Clade: Angiosperms
- Clade: Eudicots
- Clade: Rosids
- Order: Myrtales
- Family: Myrtaceae
- Genus: Syzygium
- Species: S. stapfianum

Binomial name
- Syzygium stapfianum (King) I.M.Turner

Synonyms
- Eugenia stapfiana King

Species of flowering plant

Syzygium stapfianum is a species of flowering plant in the family Myrtaceae. It grows naturally in Peninsular Malaysia and the Philippines.
