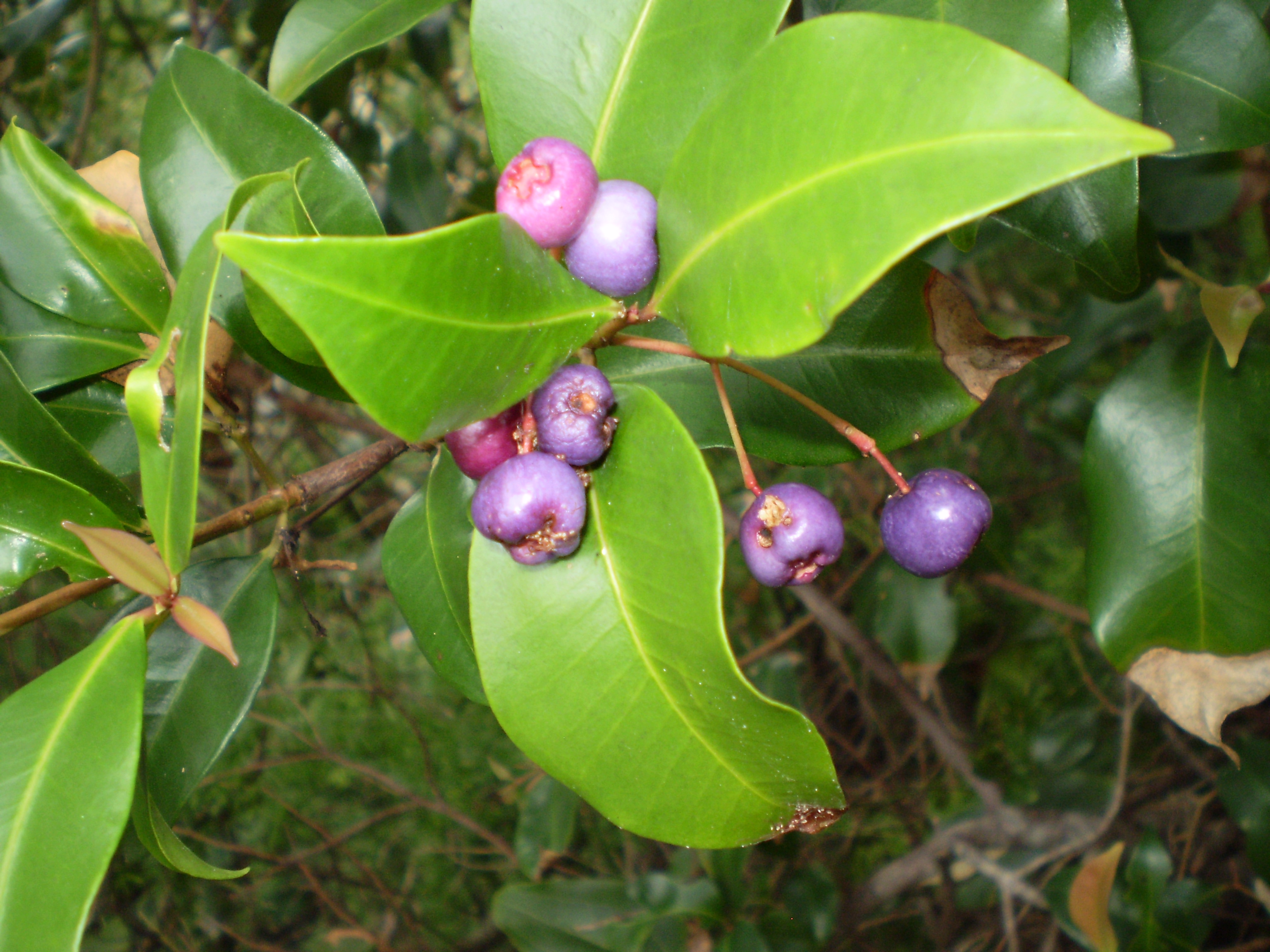

Scientific classification
- Kingdom: Plantae
- Clade: Tracheophytes
- Clade: Angiosperms
- Clade: Eudicots
- Clade: Rosids
- Order: Myrtales
- Family: Myrtaceae
- Genus: Syzygium
- Species: S. oleosum

Binomial name
- Syzygium oleosum (F.Muell.) B.Hyland

Synonyms
- Eugenia oleosa F.Muell.; Eugenia coolminiana C.Moore; Eugenia cyanocarpa (F.Muell.) Maiden & Betche; Eugenia oleosa var. cyanocarpa F.Muell.; Syzygium coolminianum (C.Moore) L.A.S.Johnson

= Syzygium oleosum =

Species of tree

Syzygium oleosum, common known as blue lilly pilly, scented satinash, or blue cherry, is a species of plant native to the eastern Australian rainforests and wet sclerophyll forests.

== Description ==
It is usually a small tree, 4 to 15 m tall. The leaves are opposite, simple and lanceolate to ovate, with a dark glossy upper surface and paler under-surface. The leaves have oil dots and are distinctly aromatic when crushed, with aromas reminiscent of lemons. Its flowers are small and white-cream colored. The fruits are purplish-red when young, changing to purplish blue when ripe, and reach 13–40 mm in diameter.

== Distribution ==
It has a wide distribution in eastern Australia, from Cooktown in northern Queensland to Jervis Bay in southern New South Wales.

== Uses ==
The blue fruit can be eaten freshly picked from the tree or cooked. It has a pleasantly crisp texture and is mildly aromatic and sweet. The fruit can also be made into jams, jellies and wine. It is also grown as an ornamental plant.

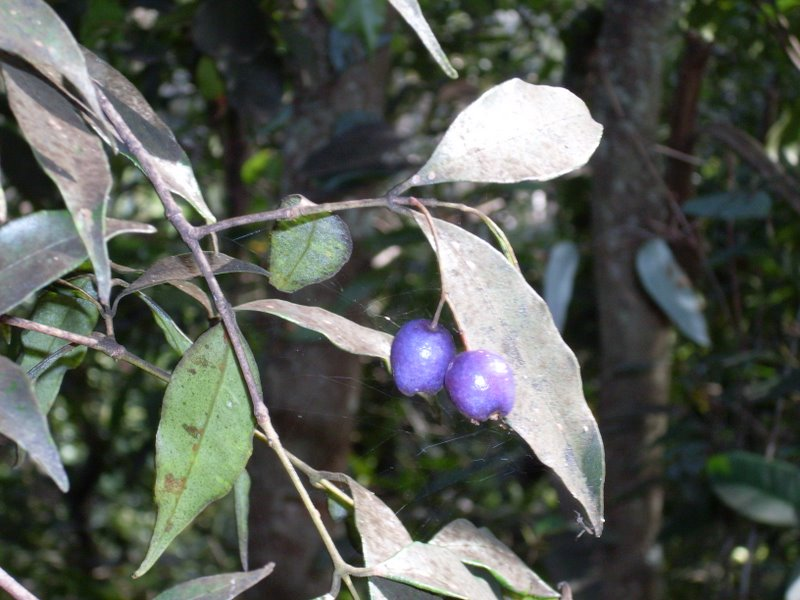
Blue cherry at Barrenjoey

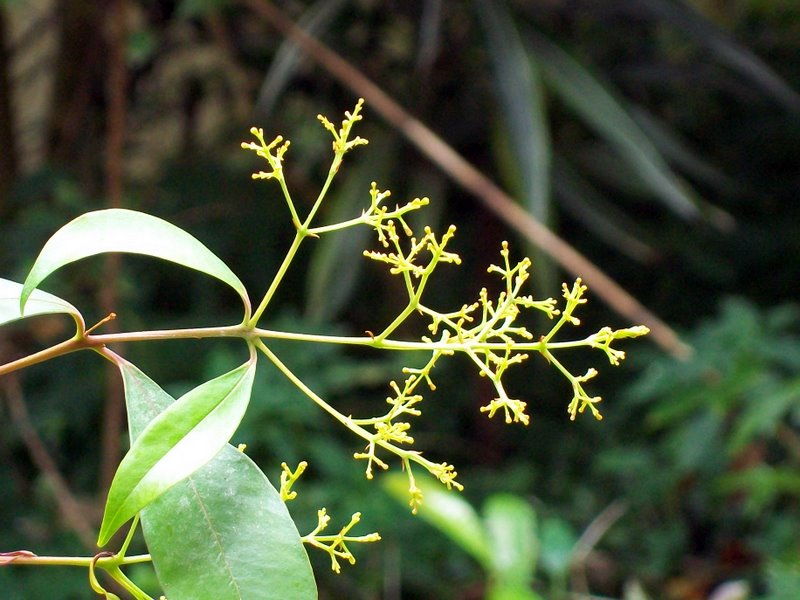
Flower buds from Cabarita Beach
