= Arthur Duthie =

English cricketer and soldier

Personal information
- Full name: Arthur Murray Duthie
- Born: 12 June 1881; Saharanpur, North-Western Provinces, British India
- Died: 3 June 1973 (aged 91); Chideock, Dorset, England
- Batting: Right-handed
- Bowling: Unknown-arm fast-medium

Domestic team information
- Years: Team
- 1911: Hampshire

Career statistics
Competition	First-class
Matches	1
Runs scored	6
Batting average	3.00
100s/50s	–/–
Top score	5
Balls bowled	225
Wickets	5
Bowling average	28.20
5 wickets in innings	–
10 wickets in match	–
Best bowling	3/85
Catches/stumpings	1/–
- Source: Cricinfo, 21 January 2023

Arthur Murray Duthie OBE DSO (12 June 1881 – 3 June 1973) was an English first-class cricketer and British Army officer. A career officer in the Royal Artillery, his military service encompassed both the Second Boer War and the First World War, being decorated with the Distinguished Service Order in the latter conflict. As a cricketer, he made one appearance in first-class cricket for Hampshire County Cricket Club.

== Life and military career ==
The son of the botanist John Firminger Duthie, he was born in British India at Saharanpur in June 1881. He was educated in England at Marlborough College, before proceeding to the Royal Military Academy, Woolwich. From there, he graduated as a second lieutenant into the Royal Artillery in November 1899. Shortly after graduating, he was seconded for service in the Second Boer War with the Imperial Yeomanry. He was promoted to lieutenant on 16 February 1901, while in South Africa, and returned to service with the Royal Artillery in December 1902. Promotion to captain followed in April 1908. Duthie later made a single appearance in first-class cricket for Hampshire against Derbyshire at Southampton in the 1911 County Championship. Playing as a bowler in the Hampshire side, he took 5 wickets in the match.

Duthie served in the First World War and was promoted major in October 1914. He was made a Companion of the Distinguished Service Order in January 1916, while the following month he was decorated by France with the Legion of Honour, Chevalier class. He was appointed to the staff in January 1916, where he held the position of a deputy-assistant adjutant-general until June 1916. In March 1917, he was made an acting lieutenant colonel whilst commanding a brigade of artillery, relinquishing the rank the following month. Shortly after the conclusion of the war, he was made an Officer of the Order of the British Empire in the 1919 New Year Honours. He was promoted to lieutenant colonel in June 1921, at which point he was serving in British India at the Artillery School at Quetta. Following four years completion as a regimental lieutenant colonel in June 1925, Duthie was placed on the half-pay list. He was promoted to colonel in June 1927, with seniority antedated to June 1925, and was appointed commanding officer of the Lowland Division the following year, before retiring in May 1931.

In retirement, Duthie lived in Chideock, Dorset. He was known there for his generosity to the village's working men. He died there in June 1973. He had been married in 1917 to Mary Frances Yseult de Poher de la Poer, daughter of Edmond de la Poer, 1st Count de la Poer.
