= Syzygium graeme-andersoniae =

Conservation status
- Least Concern (IUCN 2.3)

Scientific classification
- Kingdom: Plantae
- Clade: Tracheophytes
- Clade: Angiosperms
- Clade: Eudicots
- Clade: Rosids
- Order: Myrtales
- Family: Myrtaceae
- Genus: Syzygium
- Species: S. graeme-andersoniae

Binomial name
- Syzygium graeme-andersoniae (Ridl.) I.M.Turner

Synonyms
- Eugenia graeme-andersoniae Ridl.

Species of tree

Syzygium graeme-andersonii is a species of plant in the family Myrtaceae. It is a tree endemic to Peninsular Malaysia. The species was originally named in the genus Eugenia, as E. graeme-andersoniae by H. N. Ridley, honouring Mrs. Graeme Anderson.
