= Syzygium koordersianum =

Conservation status
- Least Concern (IUCN 2.3)

Scientific classification
- Kingdom: Plantae
- Clade: Tracheophytes
- Clade: Angiosperms
- Clade: Eudicots
- Clade: Rosids
- Order: Myrtales
- Family: Myrtaceae
- Genus: Syzygium
- Species: S. koordersianum

Binomial name
- Syzygium koordersianum (King) I.M.Turner

Synonyms
- Eugenia koordersiana King

Species of tree

Syzygium koordersianum is a species of flowering plant in the family Myrtaceae. It is a tree found in Peninsular Malaysia.
