= Syzygium scortechinii =

Conservation status
- Least Concern (IUCN 3.1)

Scientific classification
- Kingdom: Plantae
- Clade: Tracheophytes
- Clade: Angiosperms
- Clade: Eudicots
- Clade: Rosids
- Order: Myrtales
- Family: Myrtaceae
- Genus: Syzygium
- Species: S. scortechinii

Binomial name
- Syzygium scortechinii (King) Chantar. & J.Parn.

Synonyms
- List: Eugenia heteroclada Merr.; Eugenia kingii Merr.; Eugenia scortechinii King; Syzygium heterocladum (Merr.) Merr. & L.M.Perry; Syzygium kingii (Merr.) Merr. & L.M.Perry

Species of flowering plant

Syzygium scortechinii is a species of flowering plant in the family Myrtaceae. It is native to Borneo, Peninsular Malaysia, Singapore, and Peninsular Thailand. It is an evergreen tree which grows up to 24 metres tall with a trunk diameter up to 29 cm. It is a sub-canopy tree which grows on hillsides and along rivers and streams in mixed dipterocarp rain forest, swamp forest, and submontane forests on sandy or clay soils up to 1,900 metres elevation.
