= Syzygium andamanicum =

Conservation status
- Critically Endangered (IUCN 2.3)

Scientific classification
- Kingdom: Plantae
- Clade: Tracheophytes
- Clade: Angiosperms
- Clade: Eudicots
- Clade: Rosids
- Order: Myrtales
- Family: Myrtaceae
- Genus: Syzygium
- Species: S. andamanicum

Binomial name
- Syzygium andamanicum (King) N.P.Balakr.

Synonyms
- Eugenia andamanica King

Species of flowering plant

Syzygium andamanicum is a species of plant in the family Myrtaceae. It is endemic to the Andaman Islands and is threatened by habitat loss due urban and agricultural expansion.
