= Syzygium flosculiferum =

Conservation status
- Least Concern (IUCN 2.3)

Scientific classification
- Kingdom: Plantae
- Clade: Tracheophytes
- Clade: Angiosperms
- Clade: Eudicots
- Clade: Rosids
- Order: Myrtales
- Family: Myrtaceae
- Genus: Syzygium
- Species: S. flosculiferum

Binomial name
- Syzygium flosculiferum (M.R. Hend.) Sreek.

Synonyms
- Eugenia flosculifera M.R.Hend.

Species of flowering plant

Syzygium flosculiferum is a species of flowering plant in the family Myrtaceae. It is a tree native to Peninsular Malaysia, Singapore, and the Nicobar Islands. It grows in lowland tropical moist forests.
