= Syzygium manii =

Conservation status
- Data Deficient (IUCN 3.1)

Scientific classification
- Kingdom: Plantae
- Clade: Tracheophytes
- Clade: Angiosperms
- Clade: Eudicots
- Clade: Rosids
- Order: Myrtales
- Family: Myrtaceae
- Genus: Syzygium
- Species: S. manii

Binomial name
- Syzygium manii (King) N.P.Balakr.

Synonyms
- Eugenia manii King

Species of flowering plant

Syzygium manii is a species of flowering plant in the family Myrtaceae. It is endemic to the Andaman Islands. It is threatened by habitat loss.
