= Syzygium leucoxylon =

Conservation status
- Least Concern (IUCN 3.1)

Scientific classification
- Kingdom: Plantae
- Clade: Tracheophytes
- Clade: Angiosperms
- Clade: Eudicots
- Clade: Rosids
- Order: Myrtales
- Family: Myrtaceae
- Genus: Syzygium
- Species: S. leucoxylon

Binomial name
- Syzygium leucoxylon Korth.

Synonyms
- Eugenia alcinae Merr.; Eugenia brevistylis C.B.Rob.; Eugenia leucoxylon (Korth.) Miq.; Eugenia verecunda Duthie; Myrtus leucoxylon Korth. ex Miq.; Syzygium alcinae (Merr.) Merr. & L.M.Perry; Syzygium verecundum (Duthie) Wall. ex Masam.

Species of flowering plant

Syzygium leucoxylon is a species of flowering plant in the family Myrtaceae. It is a tree native to Borneo, Peninsular Malaysia, and the Philippines. It grows in lowland and montane tropical rain forests up to 1,400 metres elevation, including the Borneo peat swamp forests of Kalimantan and Sarawak. The species was described in 1848 by botanist Pieter Willem Korthals from specimens found growing on the mountain Gunung Pamaton, in Borneo.
