= Syzygium elegans =

Conservation status
- Vulnerable (IUCN 3.1)

Scientific classification
- Kingdom: Plantae
- Clade: Tracheophytes
- Clade: Angiosperms
- Clade: Eudicots
- Clade: Rosids
- Order: Myrtales
- Family: Myrtaceae
- Genus: Syzygium
- Species: S. elegans

Binomial name
- Syzygium elegans (Brongn. & Gris) J.W.Dawson

Synonyms
- Caryophyllus elegans Brongn. & Gris (1865); Jambosa elegans (Brongn. & Gris) Nied.

Species of shrub

Syzygium elegans is a shrub belonging to the Myrtaceae family. It is found on the island of New Caledonia and grows to a height of 1 to 2 m (3 ft 3 in to 6 ft 7 in). Syzygium elegans is found on or beside creeks and streams. Leaves are linear or oblanceolate, 2.5 to 4 cm (0.98 to 1.57 in) long and about 0.3 to 0.6 cm (0.12 to 0.24 in) in width. Flowers are white, they have 4 sepals and 4 petals. Which is then followed by a white or red fruit, which contains one seed.
