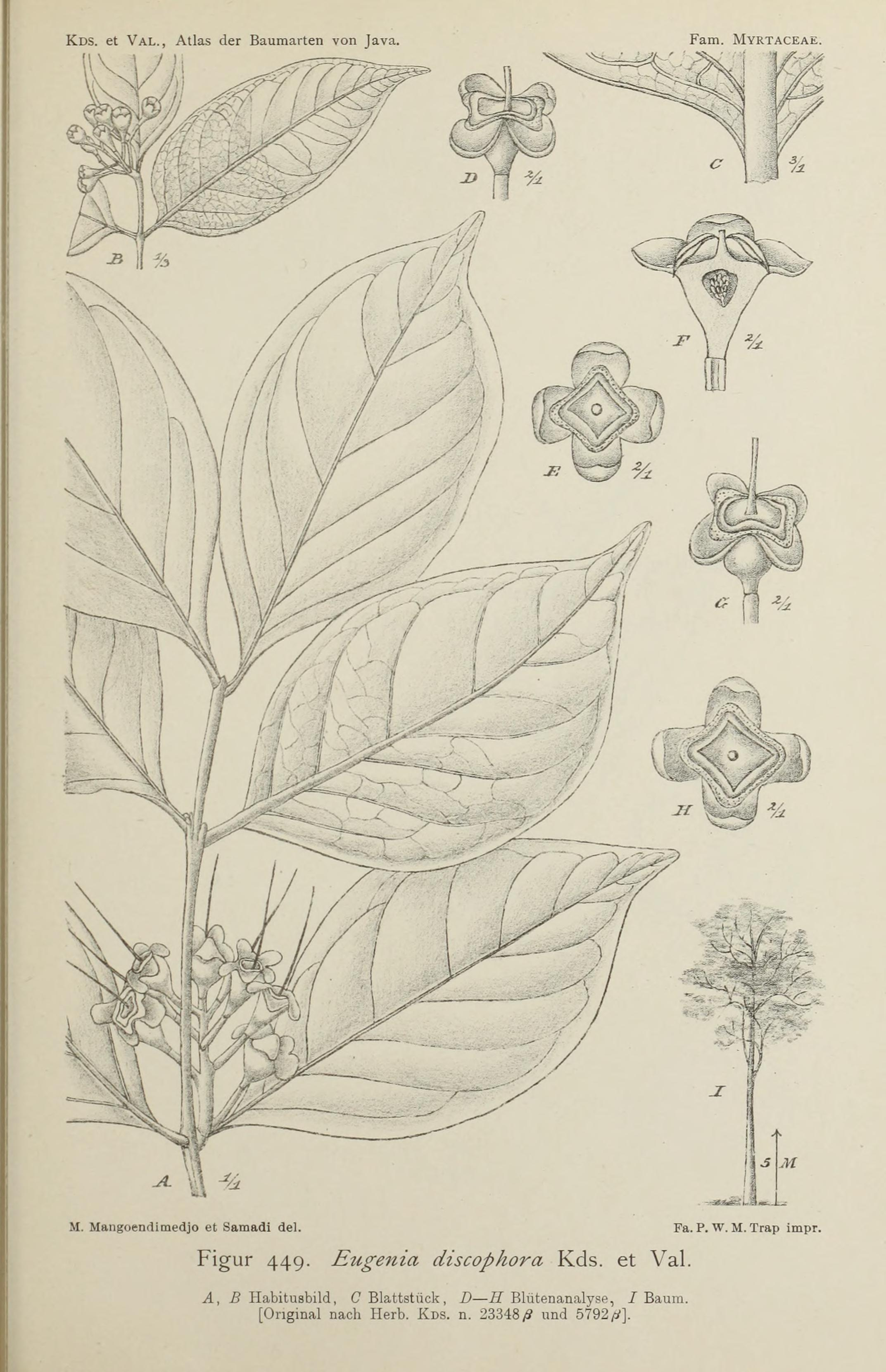

Conservation status
- Endangered (IUCN 3.1)

Scientific classification
- Kingdom: Plantae
- Clade: Tracheophytes
- Clade: Angiosperms
- Clade: Eudicots
- Clade: Rosids
- Order: Myrtales
- Family: Myrtaceae
- Genus: Syzygium
- Species: S. discophorum

Binomial name
- Syzygium discophorum (Koord. & Valeton) Amshoff

Synonyms
- Eugenia discophora Koord. & Valeton

= Syzygium discophorum =

Species of tree

Syzygium discophorum is a species of flowering plant in the family Myrtaceae. It is a tree endemic to Java in Indonesia. It is an endangered species threatened by habitat loss.
