= Syzygium cryptophlebium =

- In rainforest on the Atherton Tableland

Conservation status
- Least Concern (NCA)

Scientific classification
- Kingdom: Plantae
- Clade: Tracheophytes
- Clade: Angiosperms
- Clade: Eudicots
- Clade: Rosids
- Order: Myrtales
- Family: Myrtaceae
- Genus: Syzygium
- Species: S. cryptophlebium

Binomial name
- Syzygium cryptophlebium (F.Muell.) Craven & Biffin

Synonyms
- Eugenia cryptophlebia F.Muell.; Syzygium wilsonii subsp. cryptophlebium (F.Muell.) B.Hyland; Eugenia macoorai F.M.Bailey; Eugenia rhadinantha S.Moore; Eugenia sordida F.M.Bailey

Species of plant

Syzygium cryptophlebium is a species of flowering plant in the family Myrtaceae endemic to eastern Queensland, Australia. It is a rainforest tree, first described in 1875. It has a conservation status of least concern.

== Taxonomy ==
This plant was first described as Eugenia cryptophlebia in 1875 by Ferdinand von Mueller, based on material collected by John Dallachy at Rockingham Bay. In 1985, Bernard Hyland published a 164-page review of the genus Syzygium in Australia, making many changes to existing names in the process. Two of those changes were to transfer Eugenia wilsonii to Syzygium wilsonii, and to reduce Eugenia cryptophlebia to subspecies status under S. wilsonii as Syzygium wilsonii subsp. cryptophlebium. In 2005, Lyndley Craven and Edward Sturt Biffin reinstated it to species status under the current combination, arguing that although "the two taxa are clearly related, the differences are such that separate recognition at species rank is warranted".

== Description ==
Syzygium cryptophlebium is a tree capable of growing up to 30 m (98 ft) tall, with a trunk up to 100 cm (39 in) diameter, although it is usually much smaller. The petioles (leaf stems) average about 5 mm (0.2 in) long, the leaves about 10 cm (3.9 in) long and 3 cm (1.2 in) wide. They are lanceolate to linear in shape and have lateral veins that are sometimes difficult to discern.

Inflorescences grow from the tips of the branches or from the leaf axils. The flowers are cream or white and have four or five petals about 3 mm (0.12 in) diameter. Stamens are numerous; the ovary has two locules, or chambers, with up to 25 ovules each.

The fruit is a purple berry up to 15 mm (0.6 in) wide and long, with persistent calyx lobes at the apex. It contains a single seed.

== Distribution ==
It occurs from about Lockhart River to the Mackay region, with the bulk of occurrences between Cooktown and Townsville. It inhabits rainforest at altitudes from sea level up to 1,550 m (5,090 ft).

== Conservation ==
This species is listed as least concern in the Queensland Government's WildNet database. As of September 2026, it has not been assessed by the International Union for Conservation of Nature.

== Ecology ==
The fruits of the plum satinash are eaten by Macleay's and Lewin's honeyeaters.

== Gallery ==
New foliage

Flower buds

Flowers

Fruit
