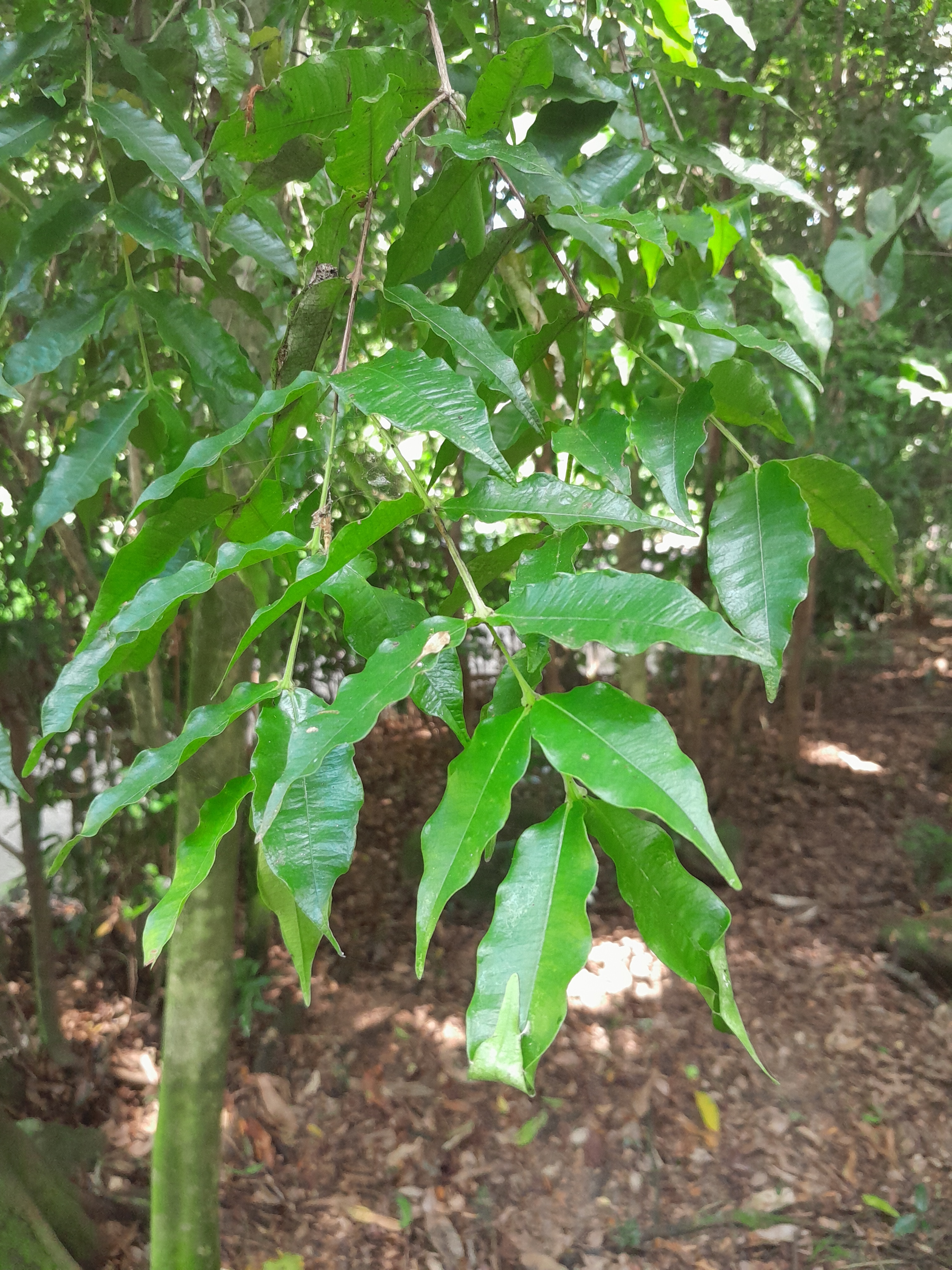
- Foliage

Conservation status
- Least Concern (NCA)

Scientific classification
- Kingdom: Plantae
- Clade: Tracheophytes
- Clade: Angiosperms
- Clade: Eudicots
- Clade: Rosids
- Order: Myrtales
- Family: Myrtaceae
- Genus: Syzygium
- Species: S. apodophyllum

Binomial name
- Syzygium apodophyllum (F.Muell.) B.Hyland

Synonyms
- Eugenia apodophylla F.Muell.

= Syzygium apodophyllum =

Species of flowering plant

Syzygium apodophyllum, commonly known as rex satinash, is a tree in the clove and eucalyptus family Myrtaceae endemic to northeast Queensland, Australia. The fruit is edible. It is a host for the exotic plant-pathogen fungus Austropuccinia psidii, which is causing a lot of damage to vegetation communities and economic plants.

== Description ==
=== Stem and foliage ===
Syzygium apodophyllum can reach up to 20 m (66 ft) in height with a trunk up to 40 cm (16 in) diameter, but 8 m (26 ft) and 10 cm (3.9 in), respectively, is more common. The wood has a relative density of 0.80. It has pale brown bark which may be flaky, and may or may not have buttresses. The branches and leaf-bearing twigs have a weeping habit, the twigs have four longitudinal wings, the pair on each side of the twig fusing together at the point where leaves are attached and forming a small pocket. The petioles (leaf stems) are very short, about 2 mm (0.08 in) long, and obscured by the pockets. The leaves occur in pairs on the twigs, are on average about 5.5 cm (2.2 in) long and 2 cm (0.79 in) wide, broad at the base and with a long tapering 'drip tip'. The mid vein is slightly sunken on the top surface of the leaf, and there are 5–13 pairs of lateral veins.

=== Flowers and fruit ===
The inflorescences occur both in the leaf axils and at the end of the twigs. They may have a single flower but usually they are in the form of a raceme. The flowers are cream, about 13 mm (0.51 in) long including the flowers stalk; they have three to six petals which are circular and about 8 mm (0.31 in) diameter. There are numerous stamens up to 9 mm (0.35 in) long; the ovary has two locules, each with up to 12 ovules. The fruit are, in botanical terms, a berry. They are red, about 13 mm (0.51 in) long and 9 mm (0.35 in) wide, with a single seed about 9 mm (0.35 in) long. Unlike most other Syzygium fruit, the calyx lobes are not distinct.

== Taxonomy ==
This species was first described in 1892 as Eugenia apodophylla by German-born Australian botanist Ferdinand von Mueller. He published the description in the journal The Victorian Naturalist. In 1983, in a major review of Australian species of Syzygium and its close relatives, Australian botanist Bernard Hyland moved this species to Syzygium under the current binomial name.

=== Phylogeny ===
This species is most closely related to Syzygium corynanthum, nestled in a slightly larger clade with Syzygium canicortex.

=== Etymology ===
The genus name Syzygium comes from the Greek word syzgos, meaning 'jointed' and is a reference to the paired leaves displayed by members of the genus. The species epithet apodophyllum is derived from the Ancient Greek word podós meaning 'foot' or 'leg', combined with the prefix a- 'without', and the suffix -phyllum 'leaf'. It may be translated as "leaf without a leg" and refers to the very short petiole.

The species is commonly known as rex satinash in Australia.

== Distribution and habitat ==
The tree is endemic to Queensland, Australia, growing in the coastal areas from near Rossville in the north to about Mission Beach in the south, with a small outlier population near Coen about 300 km (190 mi) to the northwest of Rossville. It inhabits well-developed rainforest at altitudes up to about 1,500 m (4,900 ft), but tends to be more common in the higher part of its range.

== Ecology ==
The plant is one of the hosts of the exotic plant pathogen Austropuccinia psidii. This species is relatively tolerant of the fungus, but other taxa are severely impacted.

== Uses ==
This plant is generally a small and not well-developed tree (i.e. it is not that straight in its growth, nor producing long sections). It is regarded as of no commercial value.

== Gallery ==
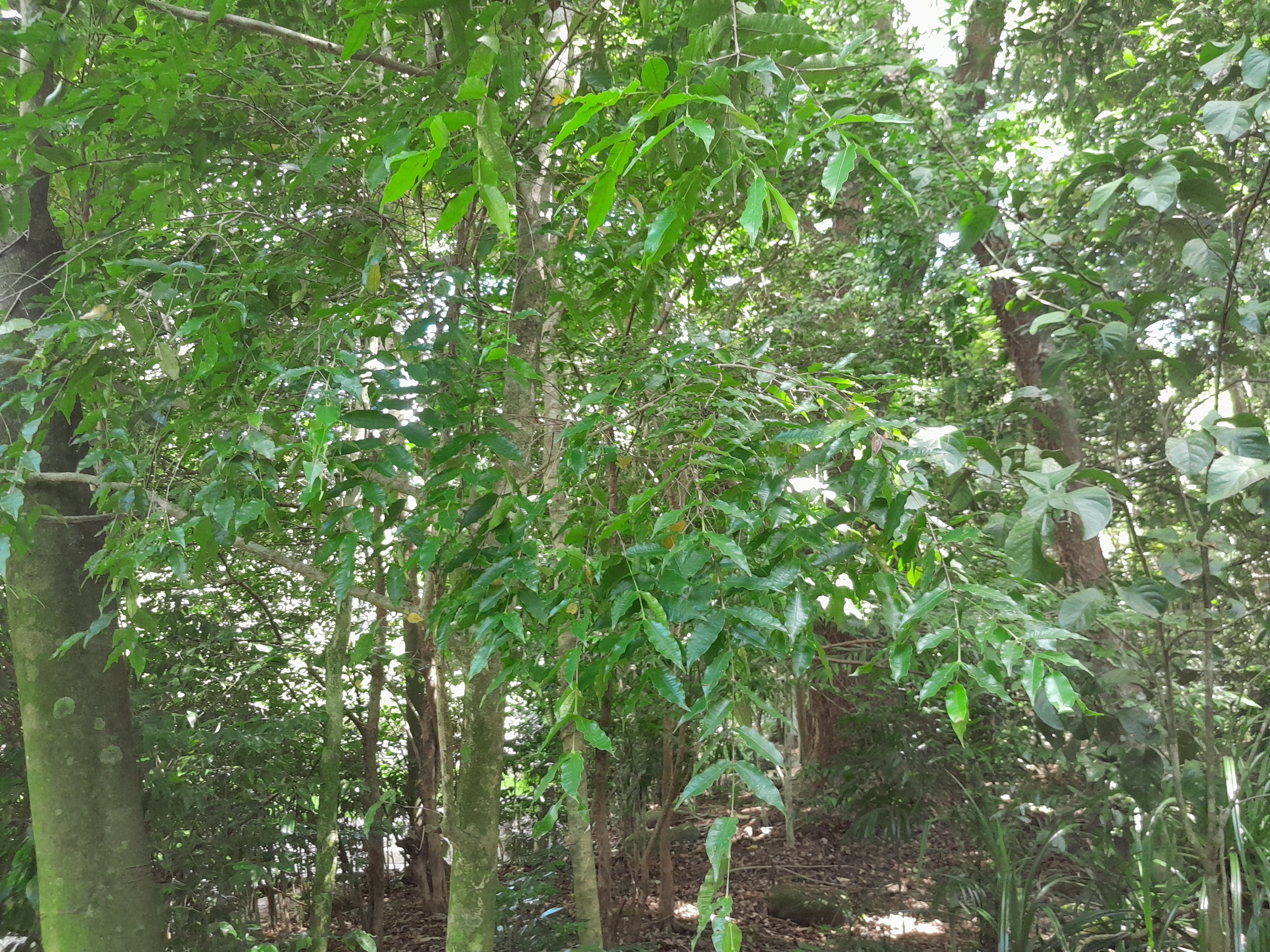
Habit

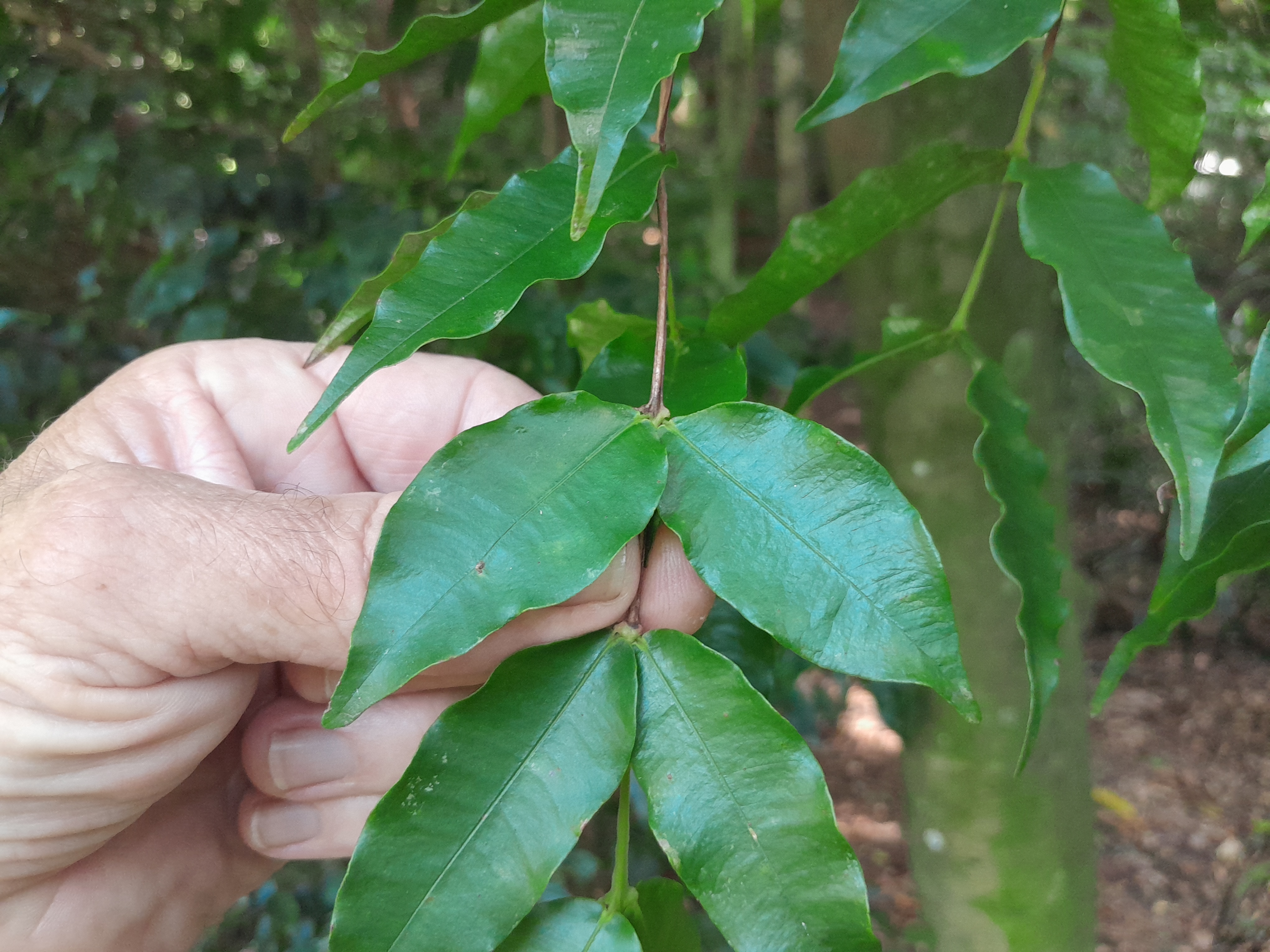
Foliage

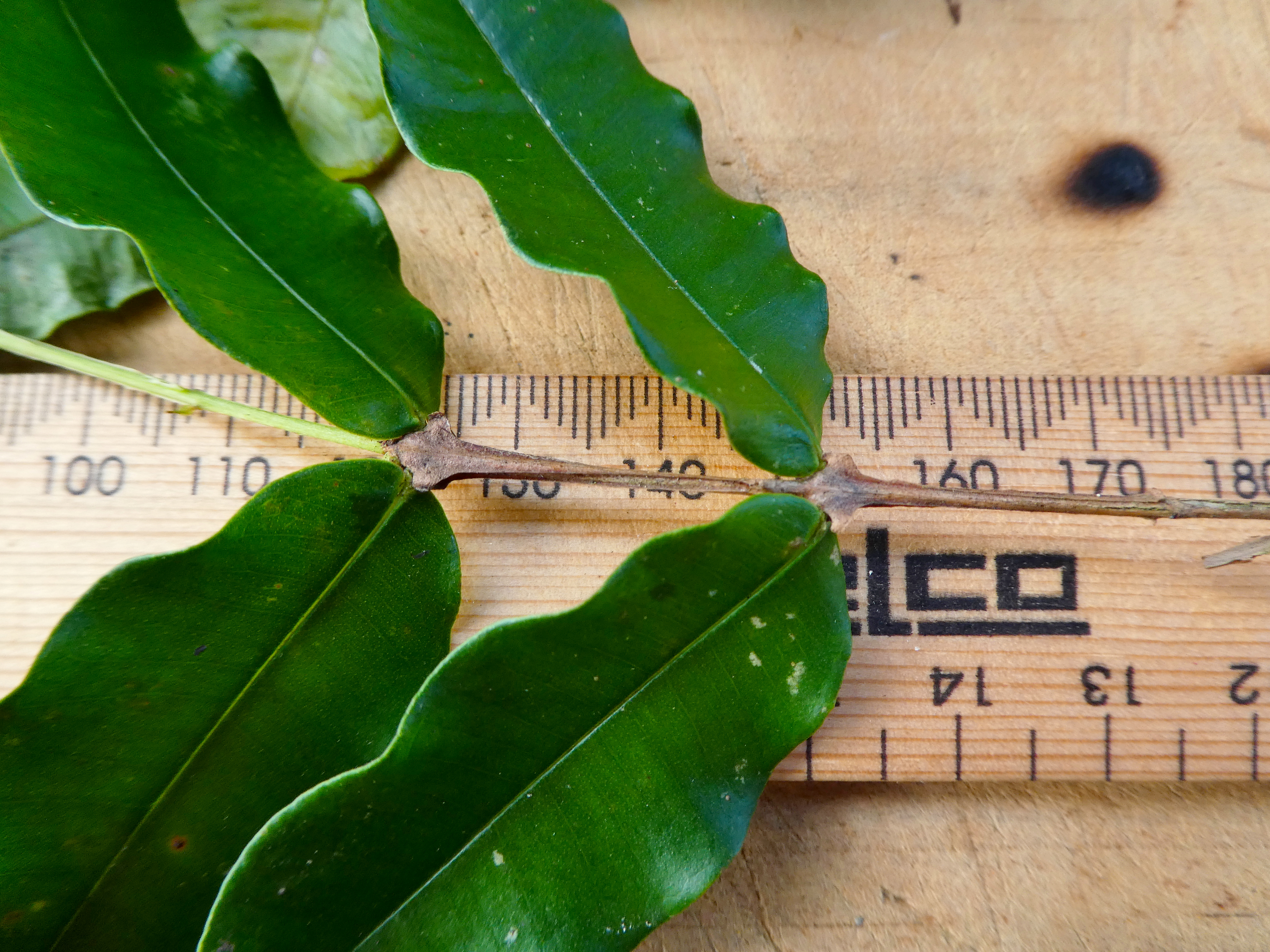
Winged twig

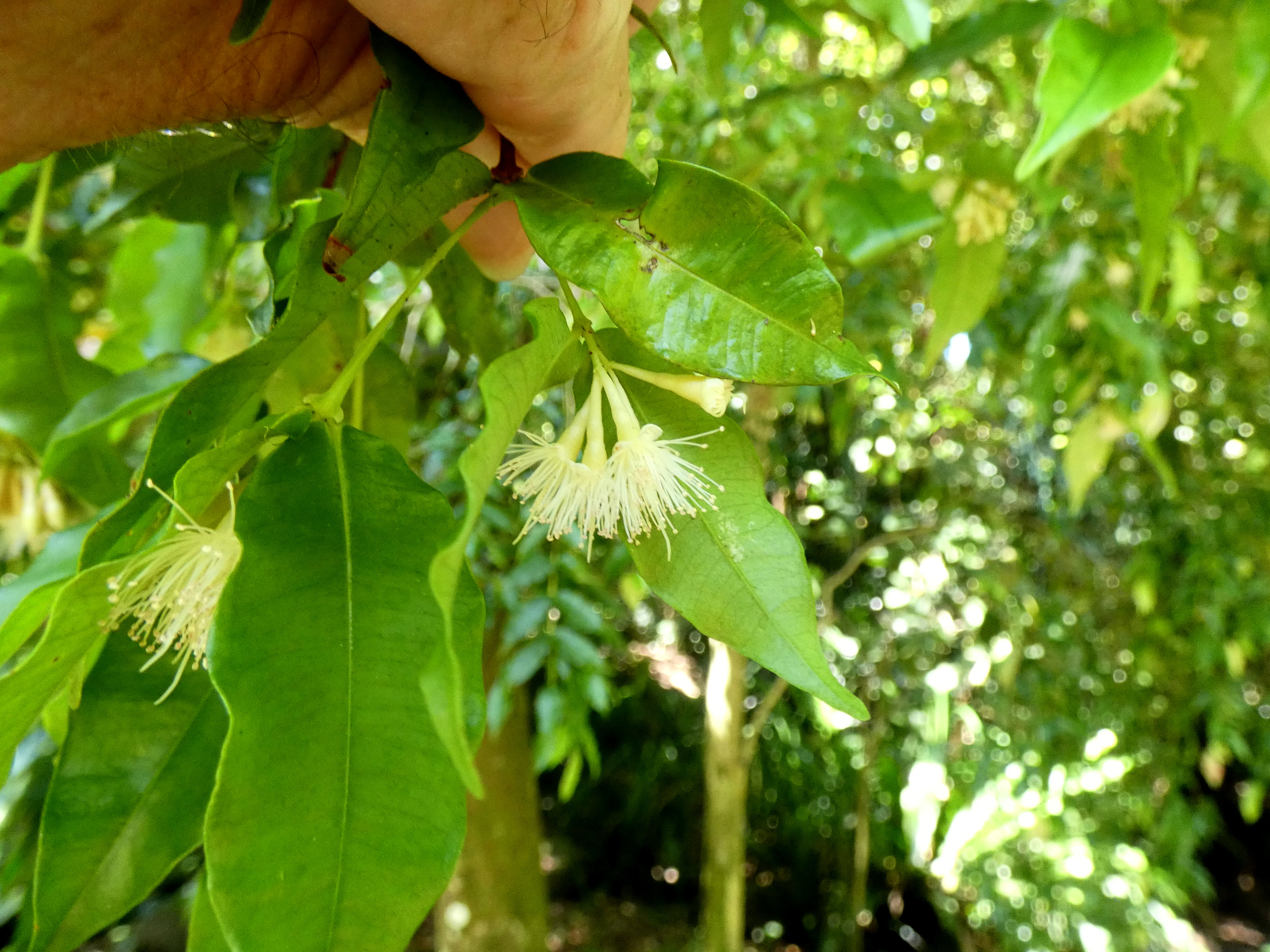
Flowers

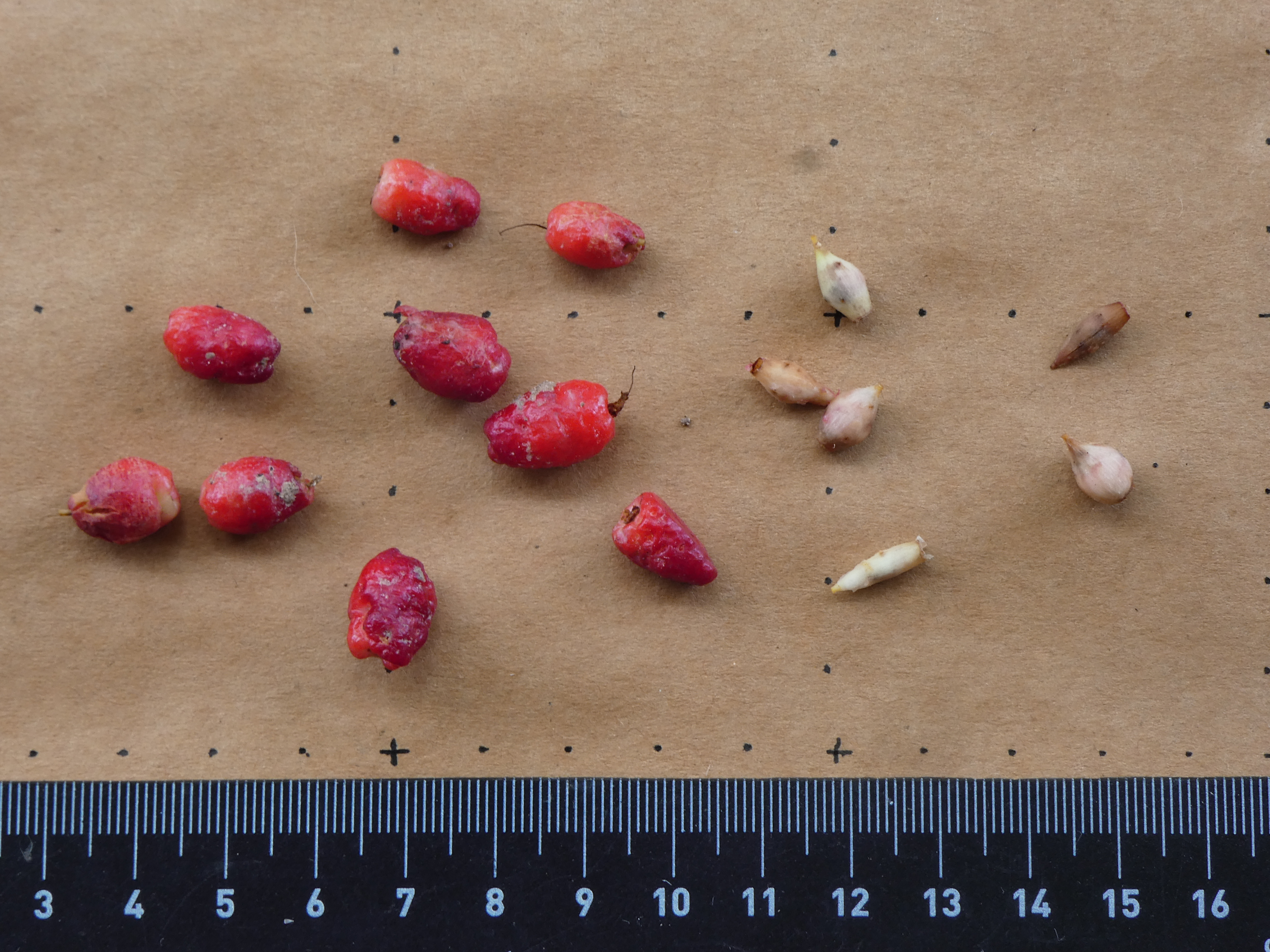
Fruit and seeds
