= Syzygium kiahii =

Conservation status
- Least Concern (IUCN 2.3)

Scientific classification
- Kingdom: Plantae
- Clade: Tracheophytes
- Clade: Angiosperms
- Clade: Eudicots
- Clade: Rosids
- Order: Myrtales
- Family: Myrtaceae
- Genus: Syzygium
- Species: S. kiahii

Binomial name
- Syzygium kiahii (M.R.Hend.) I.M.Turner

Synonyms
- Eugenia kiahii M.R.Hend.

Species of tree

Syzygium kiahii is a species of plant in the family Myrtaceae. It is a tree endemic to Peninsular Malaysia.
