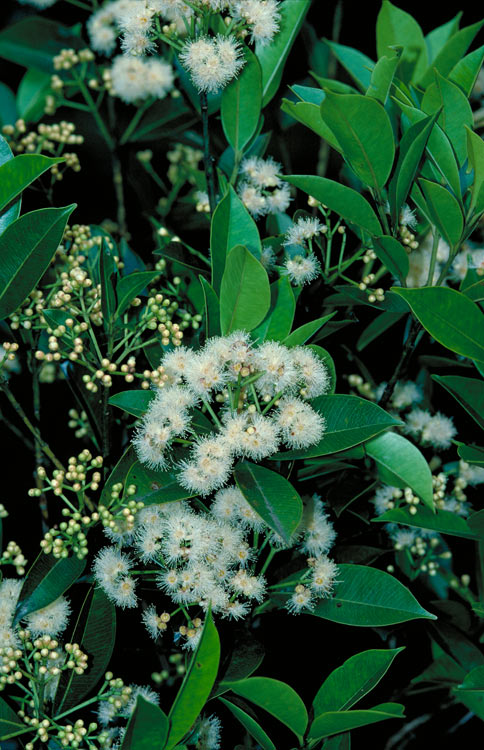
- Swamp satinash

Conservation status
- Data Deficient (IUCN 3.1)
- Least Concern (NCA)

Scientific classification
- Kingdom: Plantae
- Clade: Tracheophytes
- Clade: Angiosperms
- Clade: Eudicots
- Clade: Rosids
- Order: Myrtales
- Family: Myrtaceae
- Genus: Syzygium
- Species: S. angophoroides

Binomial name
- Syzygium angophoroides (F.Muell.) B.Hyland

Synonyms
- Eugenia angophoroides F.Muell.

= Syzygium angophoroides =

Species of tree

Syzygium angophoroides, commonly known as bark in wood, Yarrabah satinash, or swamp satinash (amongst other names), is a tree of the family Myrtaceae native to Western Australia, the Northern Territory and Queensland in Australia, which grows to a height of 6 to 35 m. It blooms between July and November producing cream flowers, followed by small fruits about 9 mm long by 13 mm wide, which turn dark purple or blackish when ripe.
