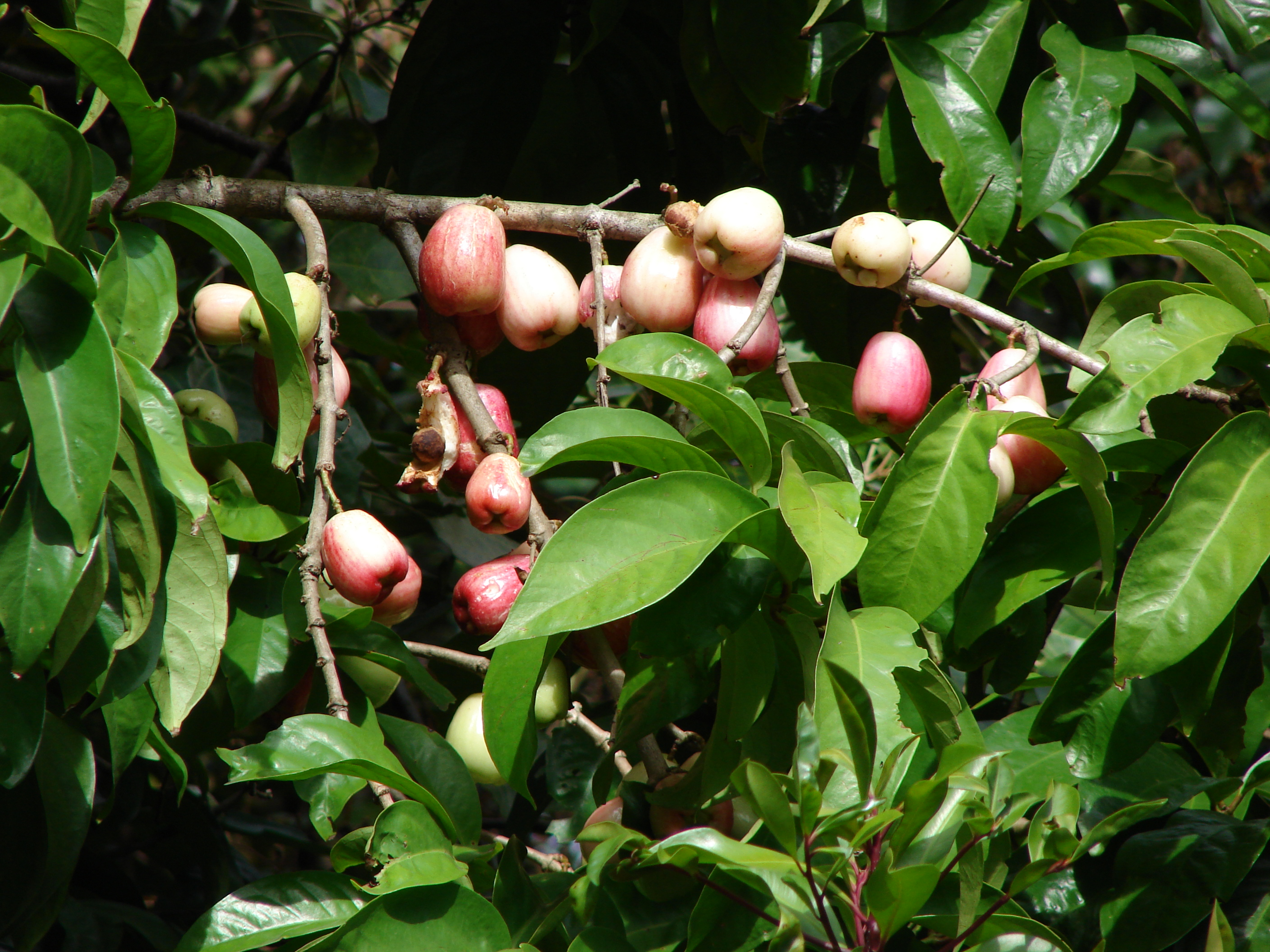
- Syzygium malaccense

Scientific classification
- Kingdom: Plantae
- Clade: Tracheophytes
- Clade: Angiosperms
- Clade: Eudicots
- Clade: Rosids
- Order: Myrtales
- Family: Myrtaceae
- Subfamily: Myrtoideae
- Tribe: Syzygieae
- Genus: Syzygium; P. Browne ex Gaertn.

Species
- About 1200; see List of Syzygium species

Synonyms
- List: Acicalyptus A. Gray; Acmena DC.; Acmenosperma Kausel; Anetholea Peter G. Wilson; Aphanomyrtus Miq.; Bostrychode (Miq.) O. Berg in C. F. P. von Martius & auct. suc. (eds.); Caryophyllus L.; Cerocarpus Colebr. ex Hassk.; Cetra Noronha; Clavimyrtus Blume; Cleistocalyx Blume; Cupheanthus Seem.; Gaslondia Vieill.; Gelpkea Blume; Jambolifera Houtt.; Jambos Adans.; Jambosa DC. nom. illeg.; Leptomyrtus (Miq.) O. Berg in C. F. P. von Martius & auct. suc. (eds.); Lomastelma Raf.; Macromyrtus Miq.; Macropsidium Blume; Malidra Raf.; Microjambosa Blume; Myrthoides Wolf; Opa Lour.; Pareugenia Turrill; Piliocalyx Brongn. & Gris; Pseudoeugenia Scort.; Strongylocalyx Blume; Syllisium Endl.; Syllysium Meyen & Schauer; Tetraeugenia Merr.; Waterhousea B.Hyland; Xenodendron K.Schum. & Lauterb.

= Syzygium =

Genus of plants

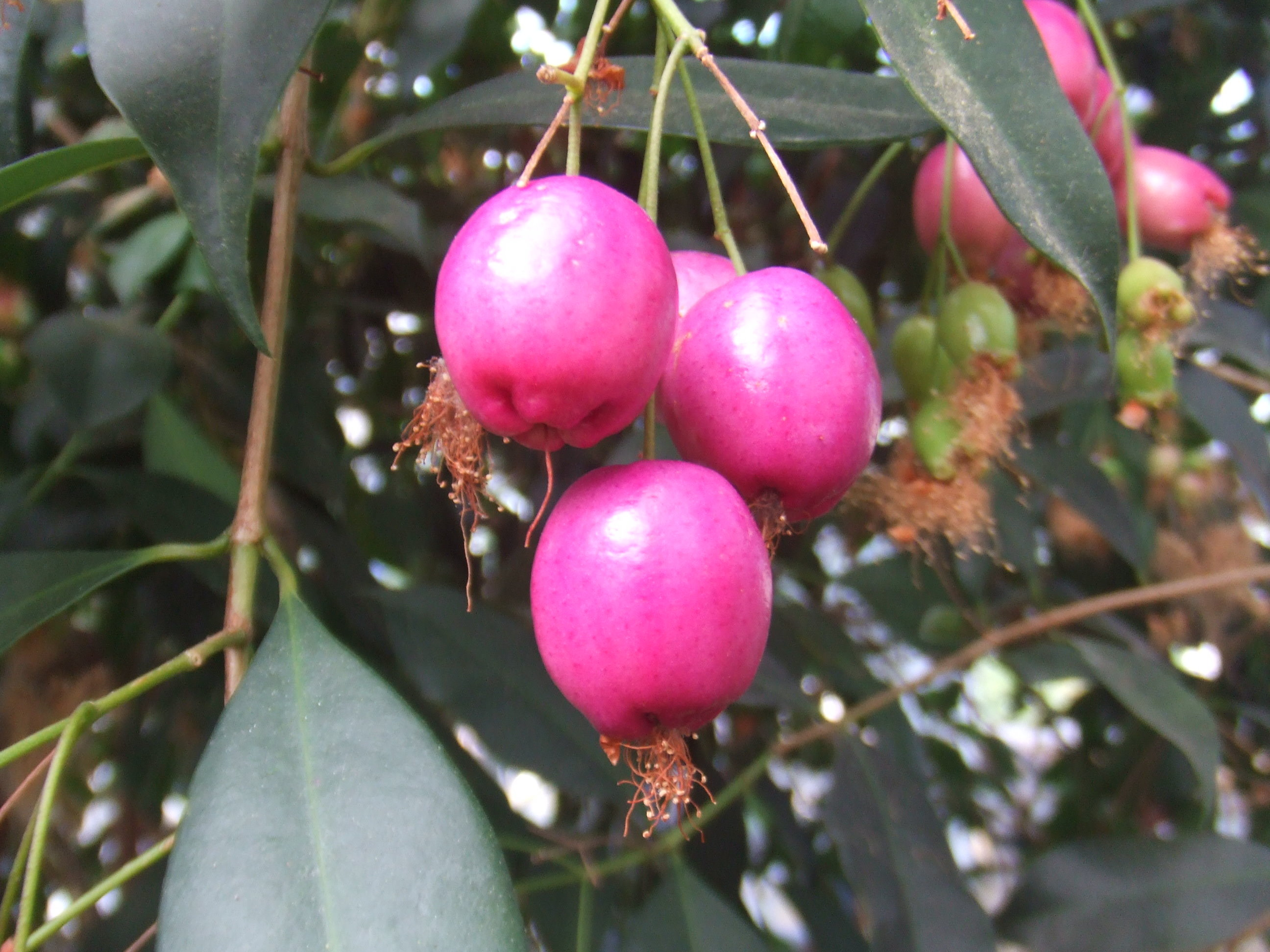
Syzygium paniculatum (magenta lilly pilly)

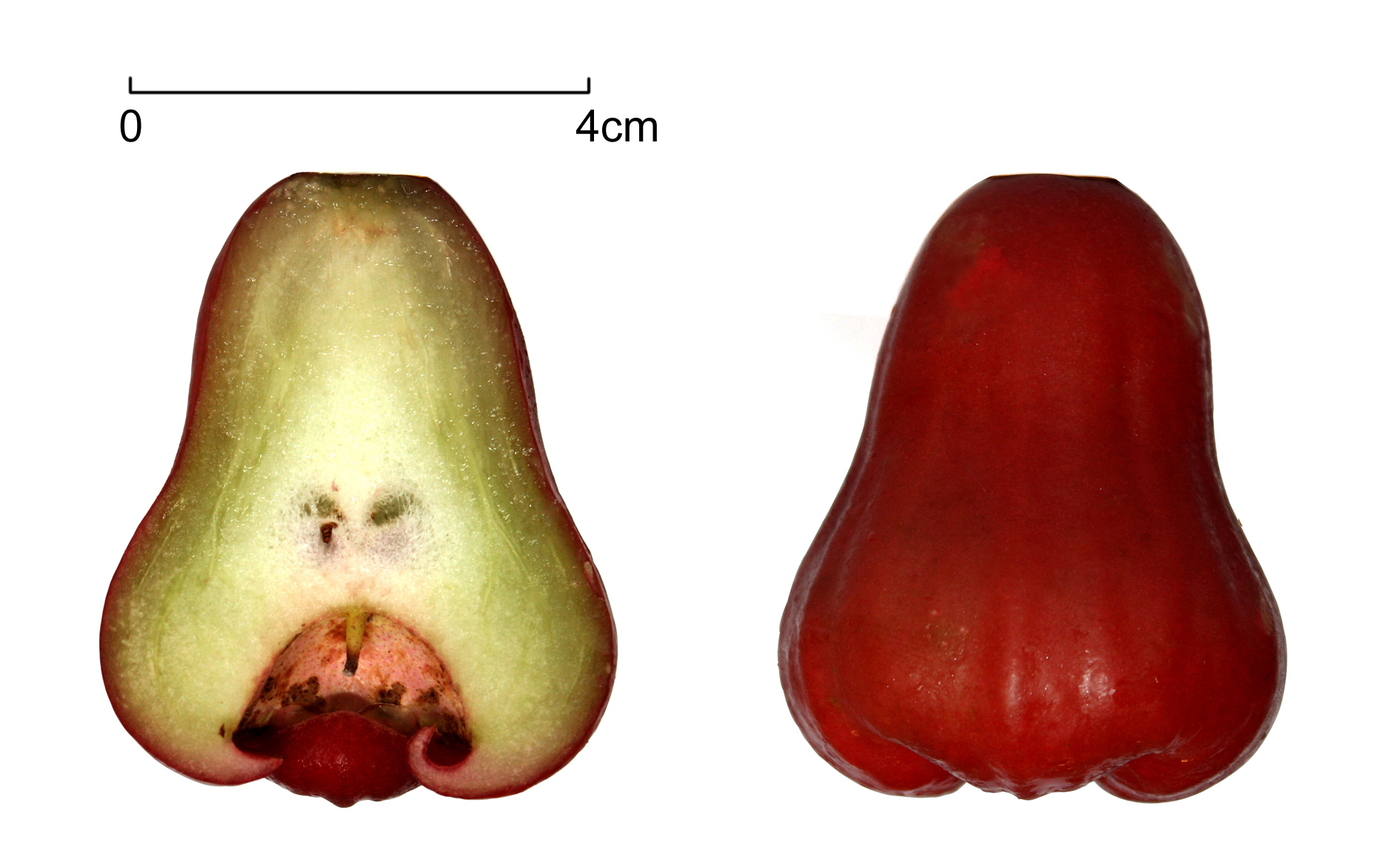
Syzygium samarangense, with a cross section of the fruit

Syzygium (/sɪˈzɪdʒiːəm/) is a genus of flowering plants that belongs to the myrtle family, Myrtaceae. The genus comprises about 1200 species, and has a native range that extends from Africa and Madagascar through southern Asia east through the Pacific. Its highest levels of diversity occur from Malaysia to northeastern Australia, where many species are very poorly known and many more have not been described taxonomically. One indication of this diversity is in leaf size, ranging from as little as a half inch (1.3 cm) to as great as 4 ft 11 inches (1.5 meters) by 16 inches (41 centimeters) in Syzygium acre of New Caledonia. Of the 1,100 species of clove worldwide, 175 exist on New Guinea alone, providing fruit and flowers integral to pollination.

Most species are evergreen trees and shrubs. Several species are grown as ornamental plants for their attractive glossy foliage, and a few produce edible fruits called rose apples that are eaten fresh or used in jams and jellies. The most economically important species, however, is the clove Syzygium aromaticum, of which the unopened flower buds are an important spice. Some of the edible species of Syzygium are planted throughout the tropics worldwide, and several have become invasive species in some island ecosystems. Fifty-two species are found in Australia and are generally known as lillipillies, brush cherries or satinash.

== Taxonomy ==
At times Syzygium was confused taxonomically with the genus Eugenia (c. 1000 species), but the latter genus has its highest specific diversity in the neotropics. Many species formerly classed as Eugenia are now included in the genus Syzygium, although the former name may persist in horticulture. The Syzygium Working Group, an international group of researchers, formed in April 2016 with the aim to produce a monograph of Syzygium.

=== Etymology ===
The genus name comes from the Greek word syzygia, meaning "joining together or conjunction".

=== Health Benefits ===
Spice plants are full of antioxidants, with cloves at the top. They are also anti-microbial, and research furthermore shows that it can likewise be anti-fungal, functioning as an effective ingredient in both preventing and treating vaginal candidiasis.

=== Species ===
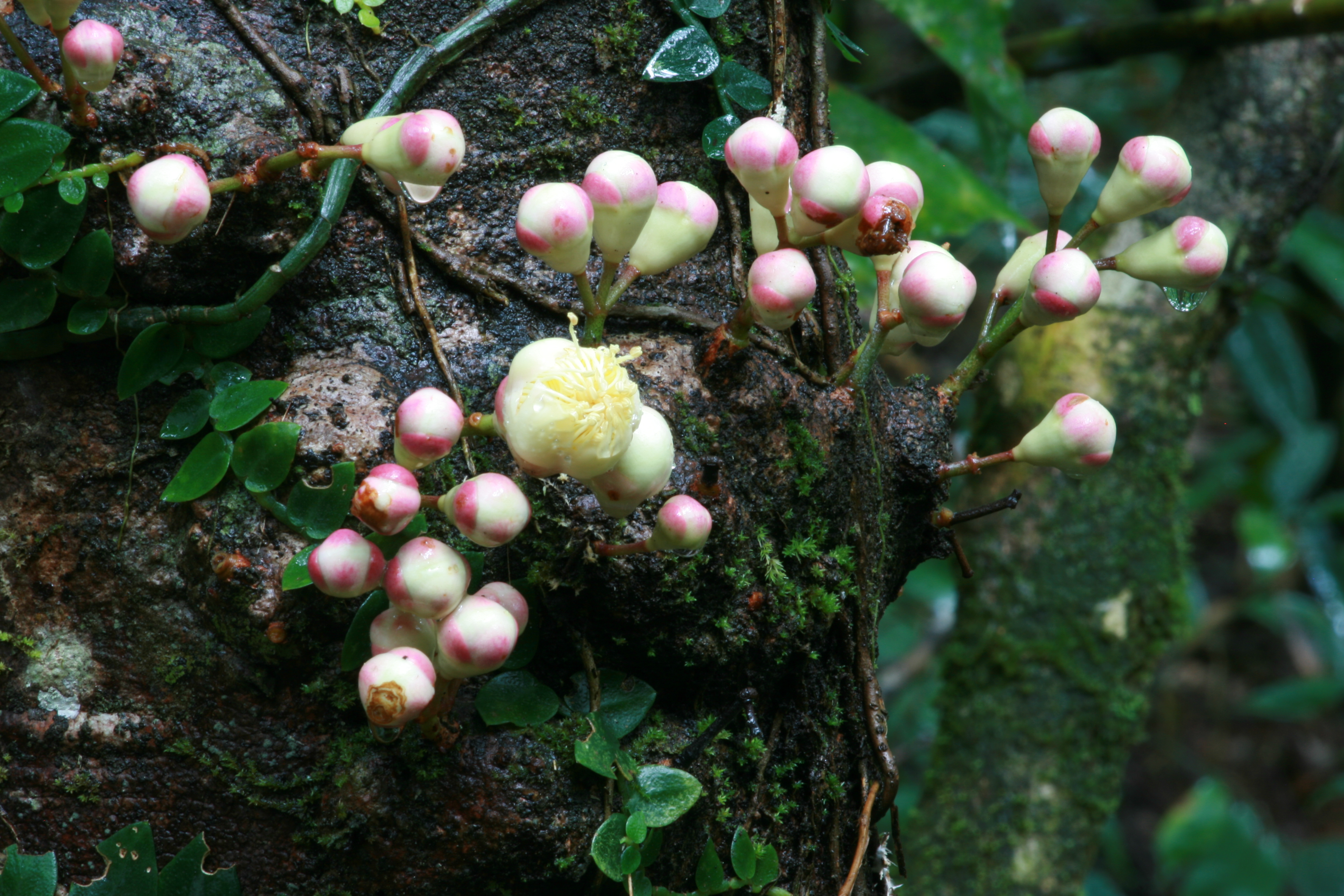
An Australian rainforest Syzygium exhibits cauliflory.

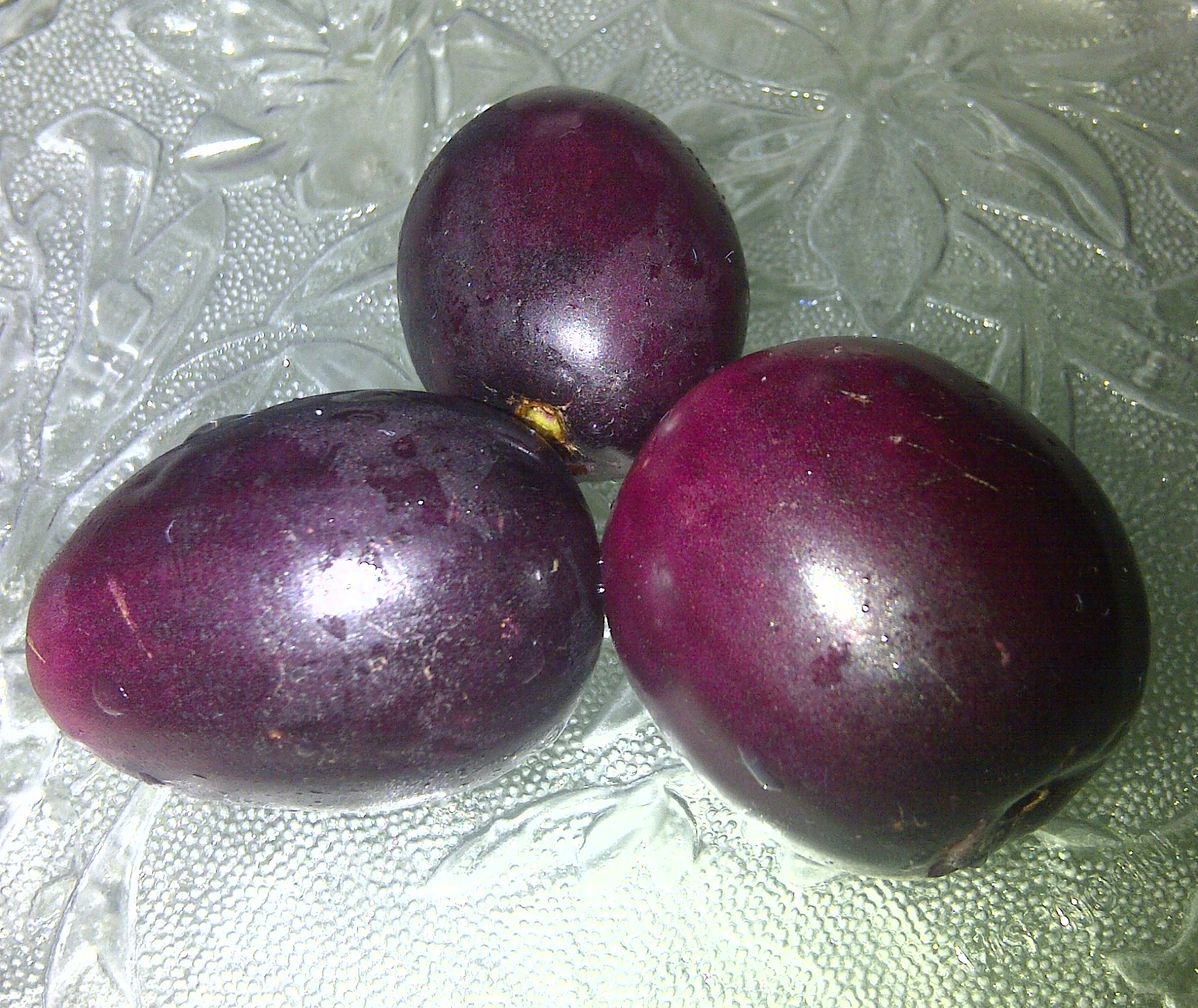
Syzygium cumini in Kohat Pakistan

Selected species include:

- Syzygium acre (Pancher ex Guillaumin) J.W.Dawson
- Syzygium alliiligneum – onionwood (Queensland)
- Syzygium alternifolium (Wight) Walp.
- Syzygium ampliflorum (Koord. & Valeton) Amshoff
- Syzygium amplifolium
- Syzygium andamanicum
- Syzygium anisatum
- Syzygium angophoroides
- Syzygium anisosepalum
- Syzygium antisepticum – shore eugenia
- Syzygium apodophyllum (F.Muell.) B.Hyland - endemic to Queensland, Australia
- Syzygium aqueum – water apple, bell fruit, water cherry, watery rose apple
- Syzygium aromaticum – clove
- Syzygium australe – brush cherry (Australia)
- Syzygium beddomei
- Syzygium bourdillonii
- Syzygium canicortex – yellow satinash (Queensland)
- Syzygium caryophyllatum (type species)
- Syzygium chavaran
- Syzygium claviflorum (Roxb.) Wall. ex Steud. – Australia, New Guinea, Southeast Asia, China, India
- Syzygium conglomeratum
- Syzygium contractum
- Syzygium cordatum – Hute, waterbessie, undoni, water berry, umSwi
- Syzygium cordifolium
- Syzygium cormiflorum – Bumpy satinash
- Syzygium corynanthum – sour cherry
- Syzygium courtallense
- Syzygium crebrinerve – purple cherry, black water gum
- Syzygium cryptophlebium – Queensland
- Syzygium cumini (L.) Skeels – Jambul, Jambolan, Black plum, Duhat plum, Jambolan plum
- Syzygium curranii - Lipote
- Syzygium densiflorum
- Syzygium diffusum
- Syzygium discophorum
- Syzygium duthieanum
- Syzygium dyerianum
- Syzygium elegans
- Syzygium erythrocalyx – Johnstone River satinash, Red Bud satinash
- Syzygium eucalyptoides
- Syzygium fibrosum – Fibrous satinash
- Syzygium fijiense
- Syzygium floribundum F.Muell.
- Syzygium flosculiferum
- Syzygium forte – White Apple
- Syzygium francisii – Giant water gum, rose satinash
- Syzygium fullagarii (Lord Howe Island)
- Syzygium glaucum
- Syzygium goodenovii (King) Masam.
- Syzygium graeme-andersoniae
- Syzygium grande – Sea apple
- Syzygium guehoi
- Syzygium guineense – Waterberry
- Syzygium hemisphericum (Wight) Alston
- Syzygium hodgkinsoniae – Red lilly pilly, smooth-barked rose apple (Australia)
- Syzygium ingens (F.Muell. ex C.Moore) Craven & Biffin
- Syzygium jambos (L.) Alston – Roseapple, Malabar plum, plum rose, rose apple, water apple
- Syzygium jasminifolium
- Syzygium kemamanense
- Syzygium kiahii
- Syzygium koordersianum
- Syzygium kuranda – Kuranda satinash
- Syzygium leucoxylon
- Syzygium luehmannii – Riberry, cherry satinash
- Syzygium maingayi
- Syzygium maire (A.Cunn.) Sykes & Garn.-Jones
- Syzygium makul Gaertn.
- Syzygium malaccense (L.) Merr. & L.M.Perry – Malay Apple, Malacca apple, Malay rose apple, mountain apple, Otaheite cashew, rose apple, water apple
- Syzygium manii (King) N.P.Balakr.
- Syzygium micranthum
- Syzygium microphyllum (Syzygium gambleanum is an illegitimate synonym)
- Syzygium minus
- Syzygium monimioides
- Syzygium moorei – Coolamon, durobby
- Syzygium myhendrae
- Syzygium myrtifolium – red lip
- Syzygium neesianum
- Syzygium nemestrinum
- Syzygium nervosum
- Syzygium occidentale
- Syzygium oleosum – Blue lilly pilly
- Syzygium oliganthum
- Syzygium oreophilum
- Syzygium palghatense
- Syzygium paniculatum – Magenta lilly pilly, magenta cherry (Australia)
- Syzygium parameswaranii
- Syzygium papyraceum – Paperbark satinash (Australia)
- Syzygium pauper
- Syzygium pendens
- Syzygium pergamentaceum
- Syzygium phaeophyllum
- Syzygium politum
- Syzygium polyanthum (Wight) Walp. – Indian bay leaf, Indonesian bay leaf, Salam leaf, daun salam, Indonesian laurel
- Syzygium polycephaloides - Lipote
- Syzygium pondoense
- Syzygium praineanum
- Syzygium pseudofastigiatum (Australia)
- Syzygium purpureum
- Syzygium quadribracteatum
- Syzygium rama-varmae
- Syzygium revolutum
- Syzygium ridleyi (King) Chantar. & J.Parn.
- Syzygium ripicola (Craib) Merr. & L.M.Perry
- Syzygium rotundifolium Arn.
- Syzygium salicifolium (Wight) J.Graham
- Syzygium samarangense (Blume) Merr. & L. M. Perry – Java apple, makopa, Java rose apple, Samarang rose apple, water apple, wax jambu, wax apple
- Syzygium samoense (Burkill) Whistler
- Syzygium sandwicensis (A.Gray) Nied. – ʻŌhiʻa ha
- Syzygium scortechinii (King) Chantar. & J.Parn.
- Syzygium seemannianum Merr. & L.M.Perry
- Syzygium smithii
- Syzygium spathulatum Thwaites
- Syzygium stapfianum (King) I.M.Turner
- Syzygium staudtii (Engl.) Mildbr.
- Syzygium stocksii (Duthie) Gamble
- Syzygium suborbiculare – lady apple
- Syzygium symingtonianum (M.R.Hend.) I.M.Turner
- Syzygium tahanense (Ridl.) I.M.Turner
- Syzygium thompsonii (Merr.) N.Snow - Atoto (Guam, Rota, Saipan)
- Syzygium turbinatum Alston
- Syzygium umbrosum Thwaites
- Syzygium utilis (Talbot) Rathakr. & N.C.Nair
- Syzygium variolosum (King) Chantar. & J.Parn.
- Syzygium wesa B.Hyland
- Syzygium wolfii (Gillespie) Merr. & L.M.Perry
- Syzygium wrayi (King) I.M.Turner
- Syzygium wrightii (Baker) A.J.Scott
- Syzygium xerampelinum B.Hyland
- Syzygium zeylanicum (L.) DC.
