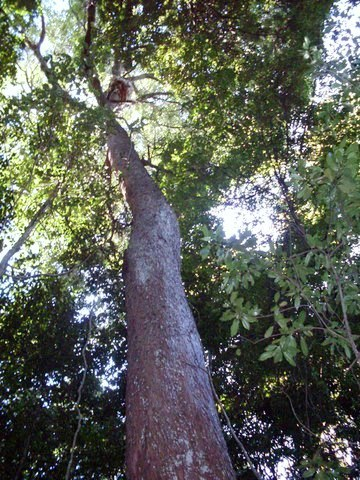
- Large specimen, trunk diameter 88 cm, estimated height 30 m, Illawarra, Australia

Conservation status
- Vulnerable (EPBC Act)

Scientific classification
- Kingdom: Plantae
- Clade: Tracheophytes
- Clade: Angiosperms
- Clade: Eudicots
- Clade: Rosids
- Order: Myrtales
- Family: Myrtaceae
- Genus: Syzygium
- Species: S. paniculatum

Binomial name
- Syzygium paniculatum Gaertn.

Synonyms
- Eugenia paniculata Gaertn. J.Britt. nom. illeg.; Eugenia rheedioides Standl. & Steyerm.

= Syzygium paniculatum =

Species of tree

Syzygium paniculatum, the magenta lilly pilly or magenta cherry, is a species of flowering plant in the myrtle family Myrtaceae, native to New South Wales, Australia. A broad dense bushy rainforest tree, in cultivation it grows to a height of 15 m (49 ft) with a trunk diameter up to 35 cm (14 in). The largest known example is at Ourimbah Creek, 35 m (115 ft) metres tall. The leaves are 3–9 cm (1.2–3.5 in) long, opposite, simple and slightly obovate, tapering at the leaf base. They are dark glossy green above, and paler below. White flowers are produced in clusters. The edible fruit is usually magenta, but can be white, pink or purple. The seeds are polyembryonic.

A population of Syzygium paniculatum occurs on the eastern side of Jervis Bay, with trees 20–30 m (66–98 ft) tall, some with a diameter at breast height of 1.5 m (4.9 ft).

== Cultivation and consumption ==
It is commonly cultivated in eastern Australia and elsewhere. Well known as an edible wild fruit with a pleasantly sour apple-like flavour, it is eaten fresh or cooked into jams.

The 1889 book 'The Useful Native Plants of Australia’ records that the synonymous Eugenia myrtifolia had common names including brush cherry and native myrtle. It also stated that "The red juice of the fruit of this tree is similar in its properties to that of red grapes. It contains free tartaric acid, cream of tartar, sugar, and red colouring matter very sensitive to the action of acids and alkalies. By fermentation it yields wine possessing a bouquet. The colouring matter, which is soluble in alcohol and ether-alcohol, but not in pure ether, is precipitated by lead-acetate, decolourised by reducing agents, and recovers its red colour on exposure to the air, just like litmus and the red colour of wine (De Luca and Ubaldini, in Watfs' Did., vi., ist Supp., 608.)."

Syzygium paniculatum is commonly confused with Syzygium australe, the brush cherry.

== Gallery ==
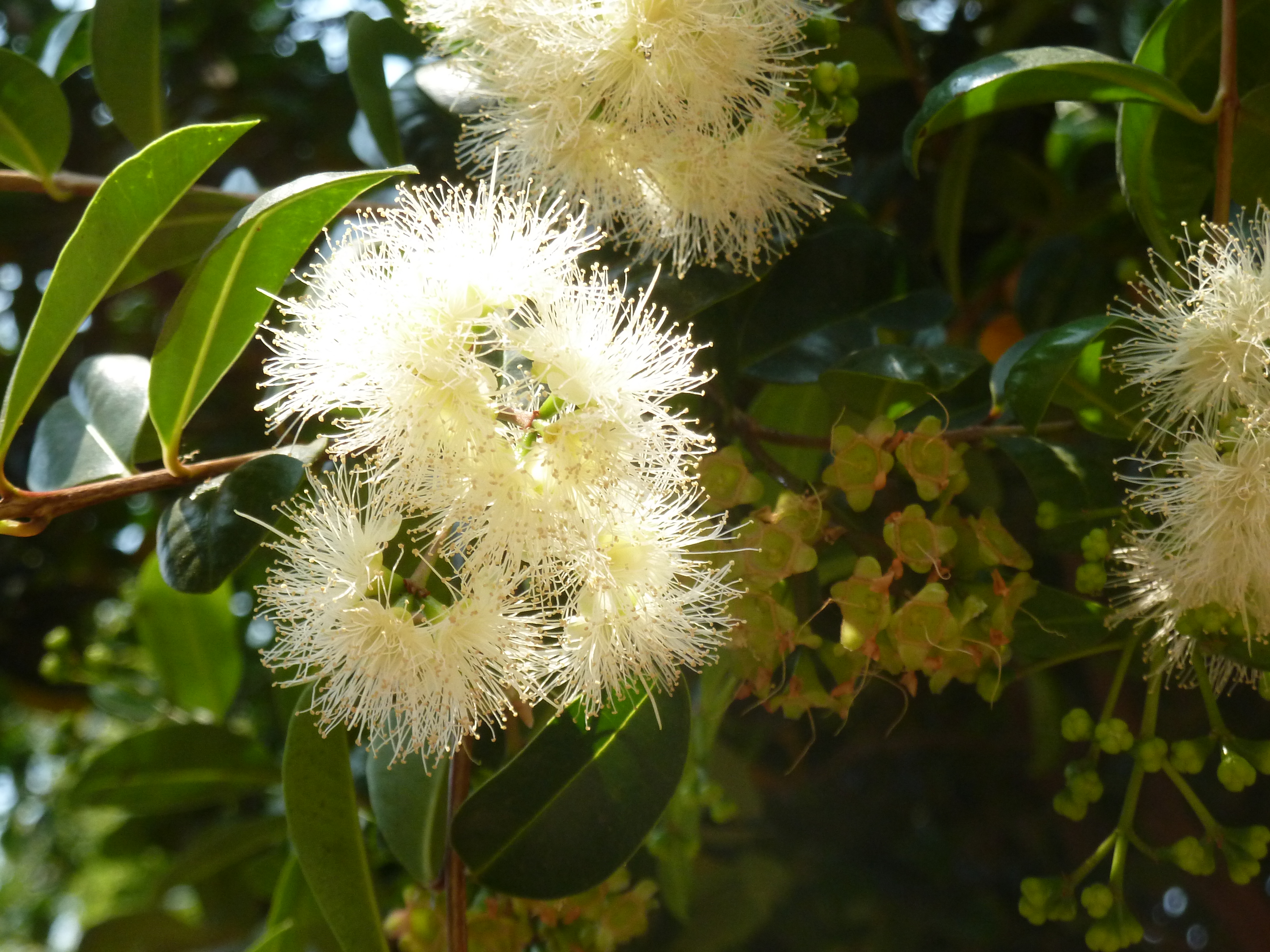
flowers

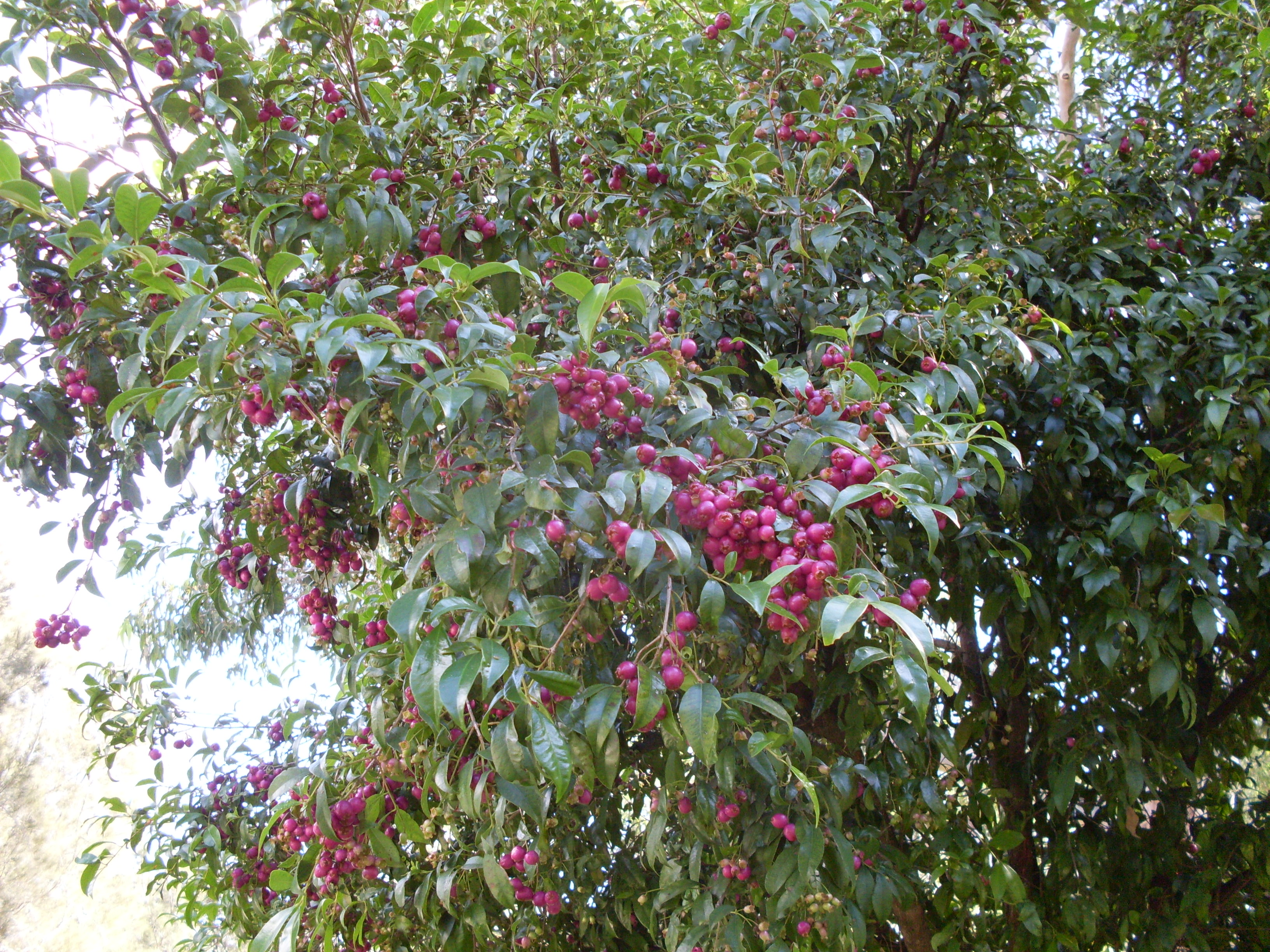
Fruit

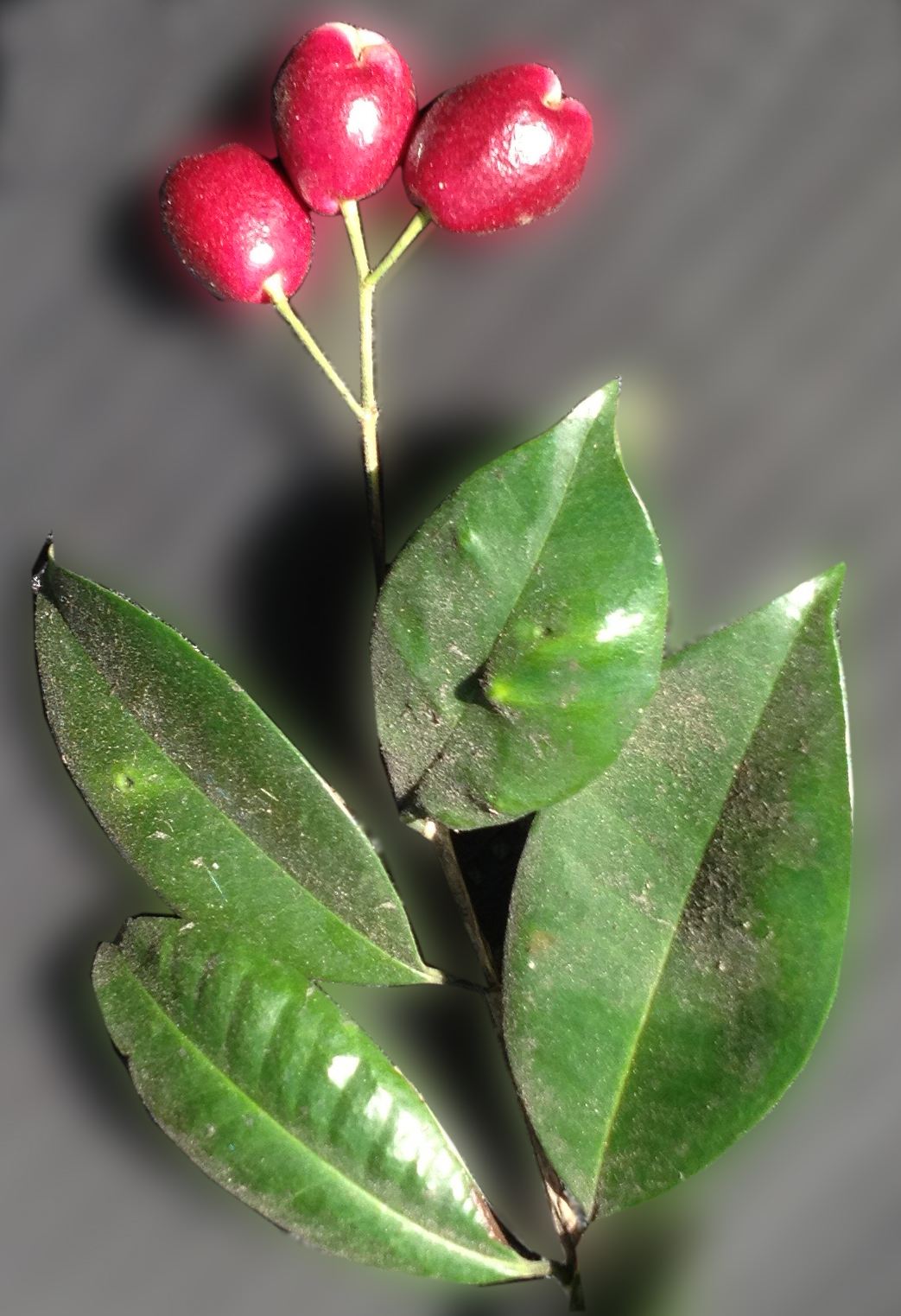
Berry and leaf detail
