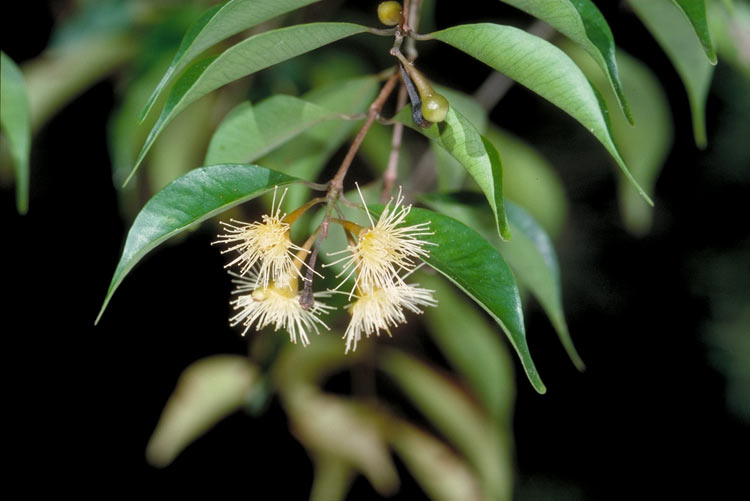
- Flowers

Conservation status
- Least Concern (NCA)

Scientific classification
- Kingdom: Plantae
- Clade: Embryophytes
- Clade: Tracheophytes
- Clade: Angiosperms
- Clade: Eudicots
- Clade: Rosids
- Order: Myrtales
- Family: Myrtaceae
- Genus: Syzygium
- Species: S. canicortex

Binomial name
- Syzygium canicortex B.Hyland

= Syzygium canicortex =

Yellow satinash

Species of tree

Syzygium canicortex, commonly known as yellow satinash, is a tree in the family Myrtaceae native to Queensland, Australia, first described in 1983.

== Description ==
Syzygium canicortex is a tree growing up to about 35 m (115 ft) tall, with a buttressed or fluted trunk up to 1 m (3 ft 3 in) diameter. Leaves are arranged in opposite pairs on small twigs about 1 mm (0.04 in) diameter. They are ovate to elliptic and usually have an unusually long drip tip. They measure on average about 3.4 cm (1.3 in) long by 1.4 cm (0.55 in) wide, and are held on a petiole up to 5 mm (0.20 in) long. New growth is deep red, transitioning to green.

Flowers are most often produced in the leaf axils and are mostly solitary, rarely in a few-flowered raceme. The developing bud is covered by a cap (known as an operculum) which is shed at maturity along with the attached petals. The hypanthium tapers slowly into the pedicel (flower stem), the stamens are numerous, yellow, and about 5 mm (0.20 in) long. The style is about 7 mm (0.28 in) long. The fruit is, in botanical terms, a berry, red, about 9 mm (0.35 in) diameter, and contains a single seed.

== Taxonomy ==
This plant was first described in 1983 by the Australian botanist Bernard Hyland, as part of a major review of the genus and some relatives. His paper, titled "A revision of Syzygium and allied genera (Myrtaceae) in Australia", was published in the Australian Journal of Botany.

=== Etymology ===
The genus name Syzygium comes from the Greek word syzgos, meaning "joined" and is a reference to the paired leaves displayed by members of the genus. The species epithet canicortex was given as a reference to the grey cortex (Canus is Latin for grey).

== Distribution and habitat ==
The yellow satinash is endemic to Queensland, and is found along the coast and coastal ranges from the area near Rossville south to the Paluma Range National Park. It grows in rainforest at altitudes from about 80 m (260 ft) to 1,400 m (4,600 ft), often on granite soils.

== Conservation ==
Syzygium canicortex is listed as least concern under the Queensland Government's Nature Conservation Act. As of August 2024, it has not been assessed by the International Union for Conservation of Nature (IUCN).

== Uses ==
This species has been used in the past as a structural timber, sold under the name 'Yellow Satinash'. The wood has a specific gravity of 0.7 to 0.73.

== Gallery ==
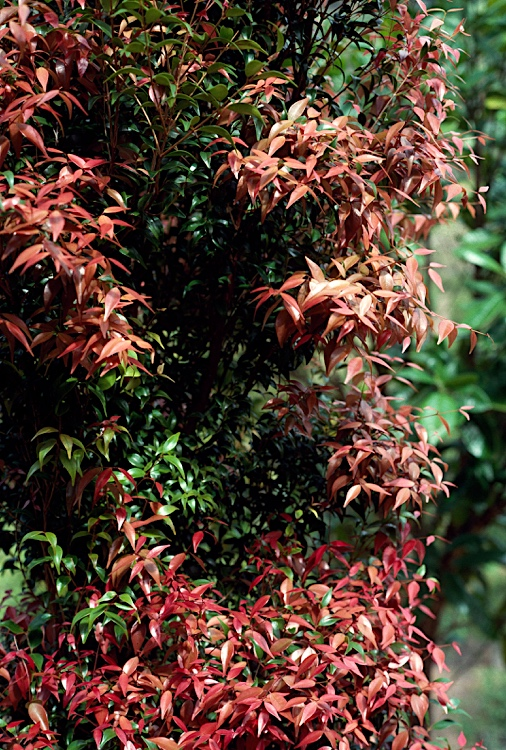
New foliage

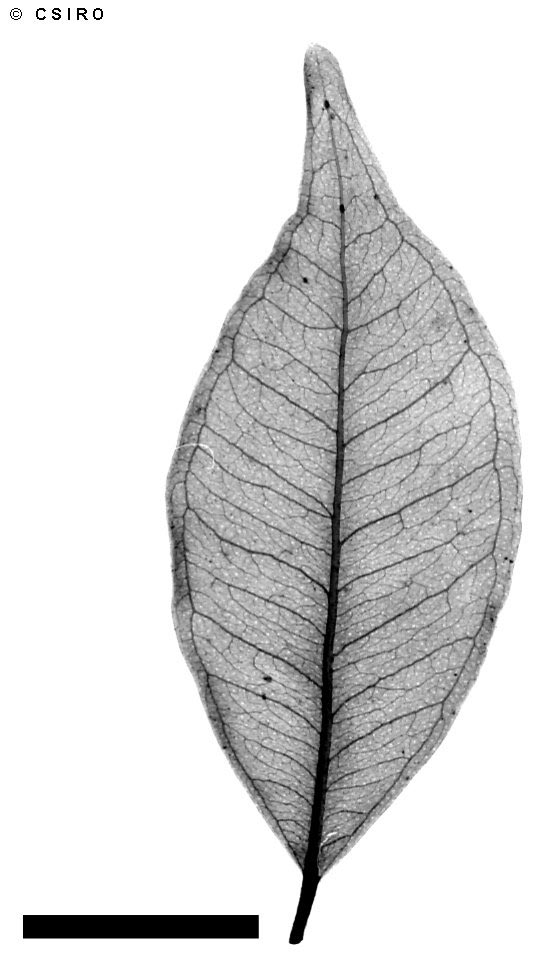
X-ray of leaf

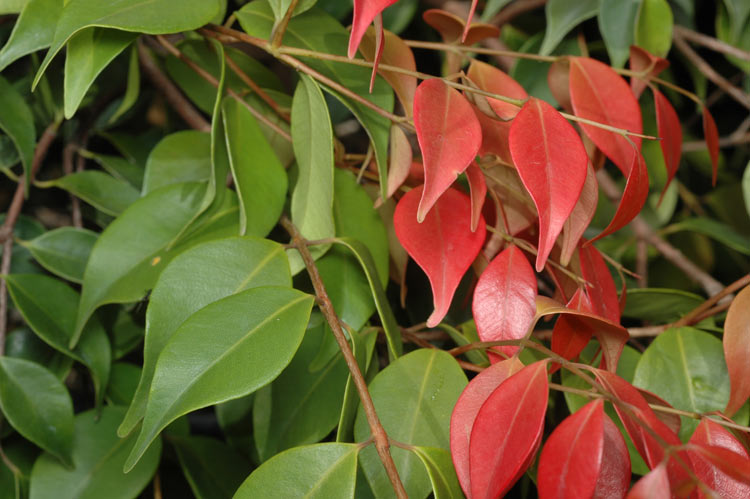
Foliage

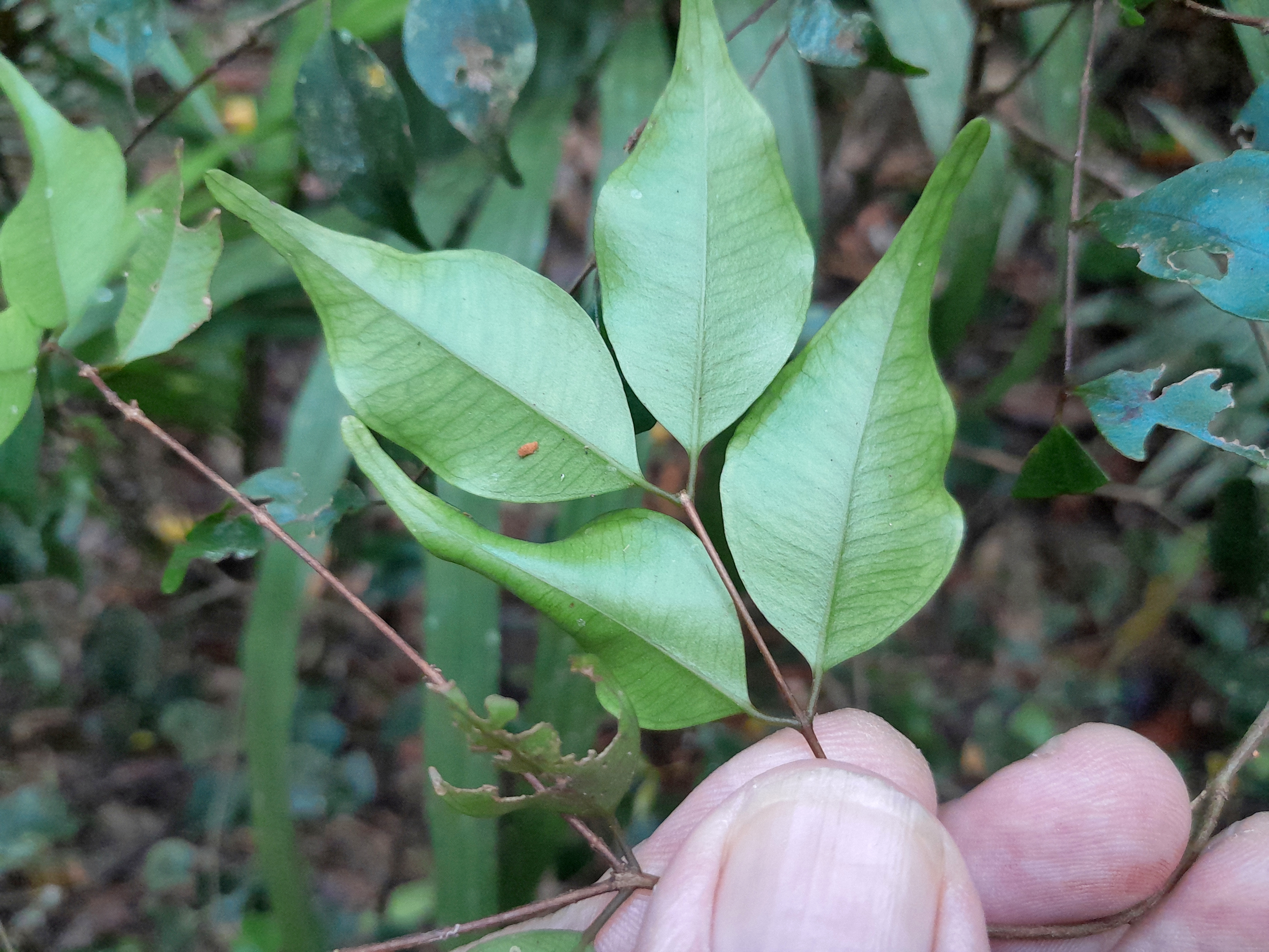
Foliage

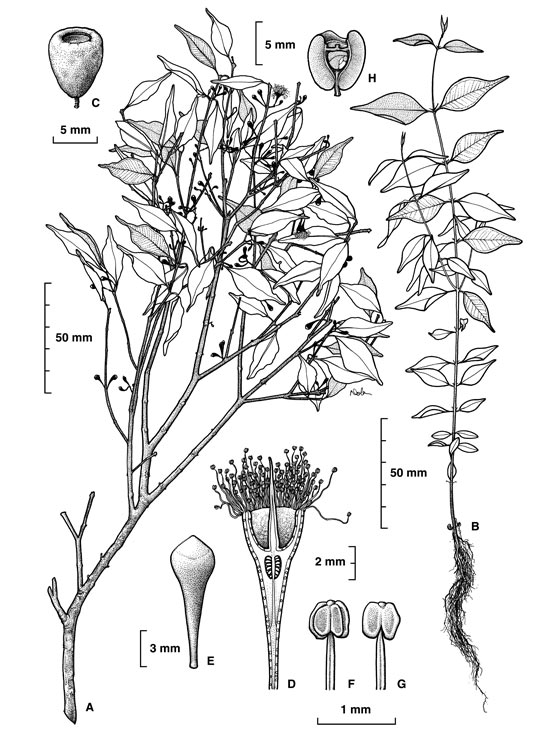
Botanical illustration
