= John Firminger Duthie =

British botanist in India (1845–1922)

John Firminger Duthie (1845–1922) was an English botanist and explorer. From 1875 to 1903 he was the Superintendent of Saharanpur Botanical Gardens. He collected plants in India, Nepal and adjacent countries and distributed several exsiccata-like specimen series among herbaria, one with the title Flora of North-Western India.

His son was the British Army officer and cricketer Arthur Duthie.
