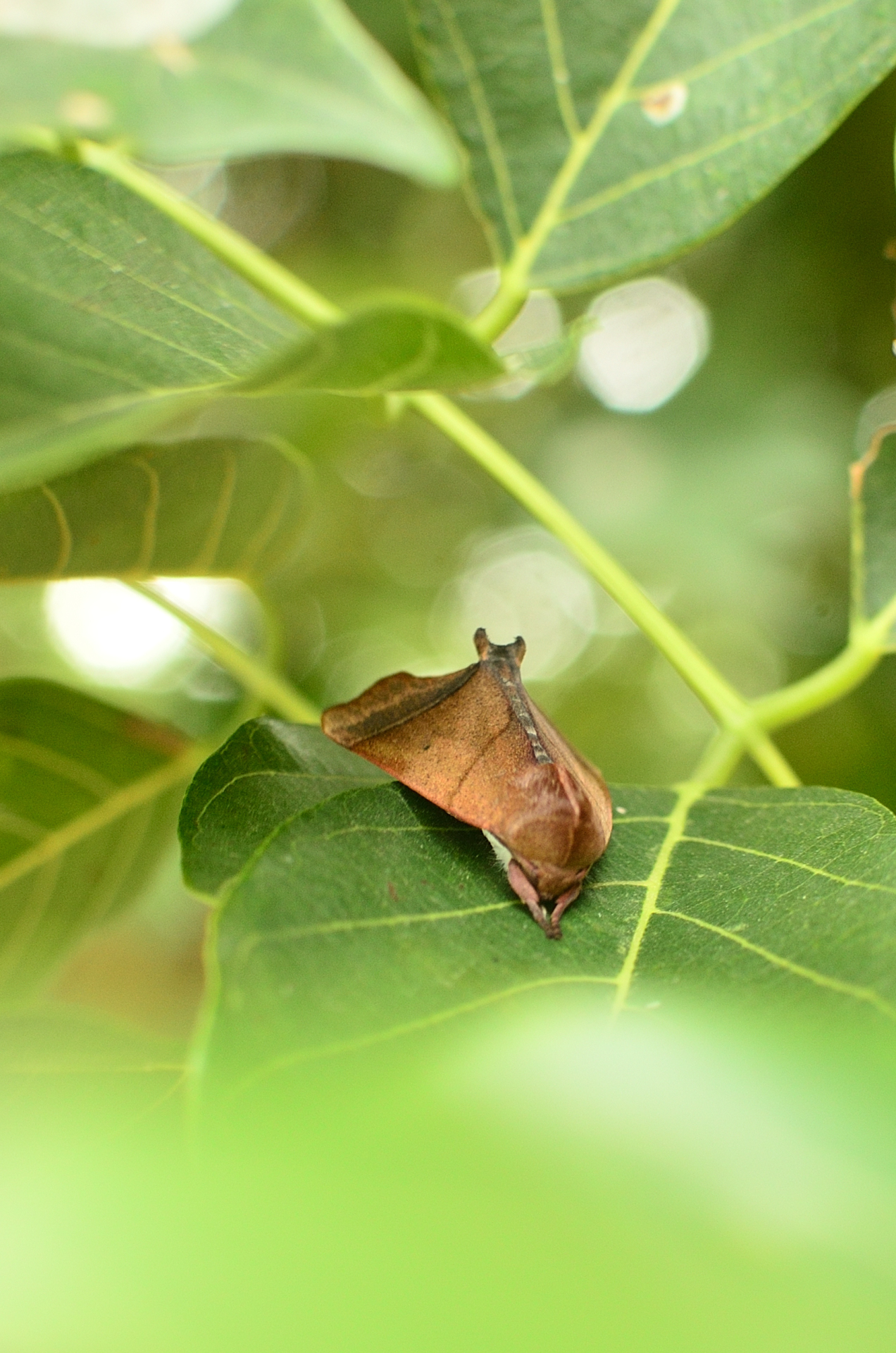
- Adult
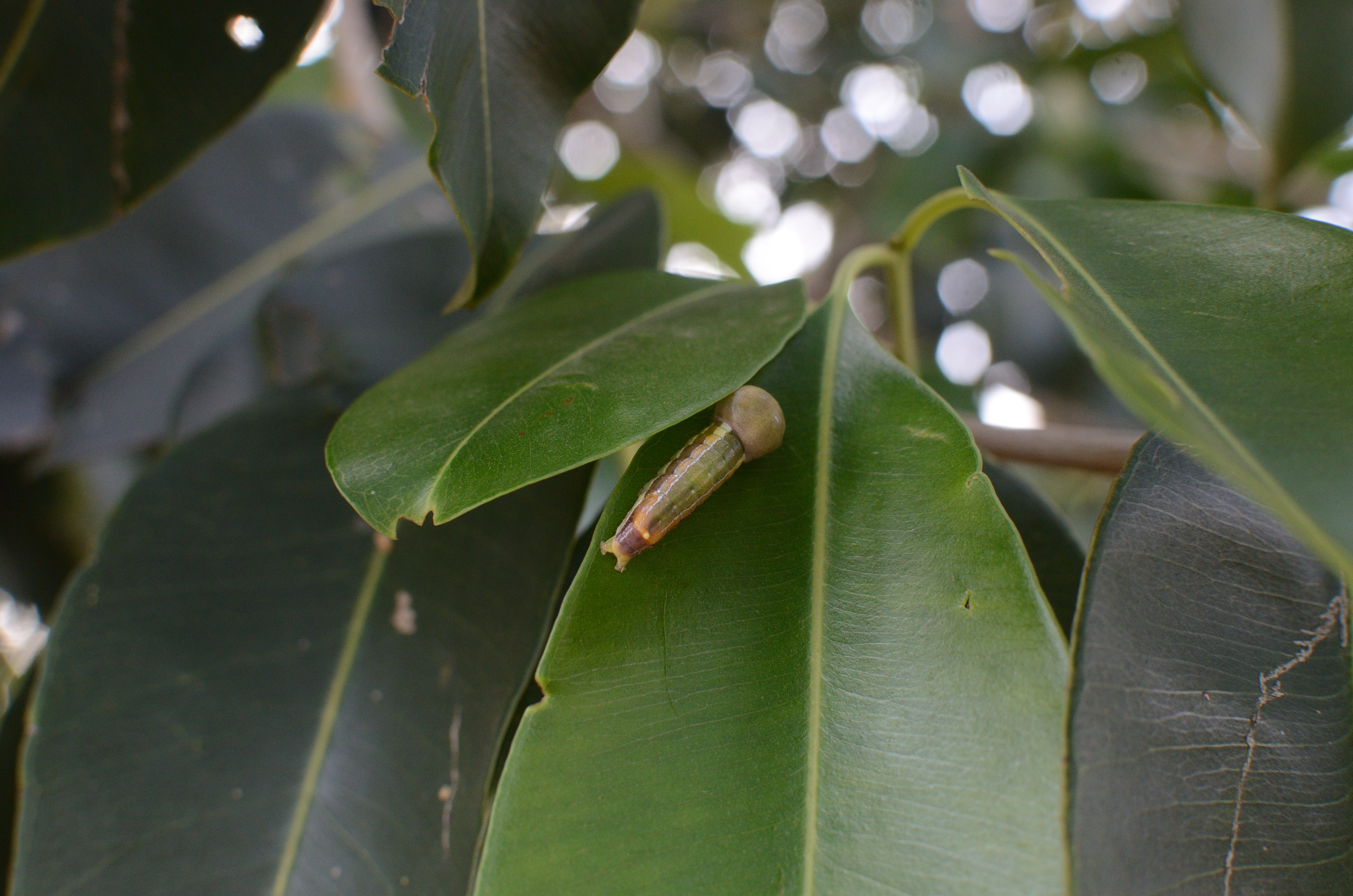
- Larva

Scientific classification
- Kingdom: Animalia
- Phylum: Arthropoda
- Class: Insecta
- Order: Lepidoptera
- Superfamily: Noctuoidea
- Family: Nolidae
- Genus: Carea
- Species: C. angulata

Binomial name
- Carea angulata (Fabricius, 1793)

Synonyms
- Bombyx angulata Fabricius, 1793; Dabarita subtilis Walker, [1857]; Carea innocens Swinhoe, 1918; Carea intermedia Swinhoe, 1918

= Carea angulata =

Species of moth

Carea angulata is a moth of the family Nolidae first described by Johan Christian Fabricius in 1793. It is found in India, Sri Lanka, China and Indonesia.

== Description ==
The wingspan of the female is 42 mm. Palpi upturned. Antennae ciliated. Head, thorax and forewings varying from pinkish red to reddish brown. Abdomen whitish with fuscous to reddish-brown suffusion. Forewing apex quadrate. There is an outwardly oblique line from the costa. A curved double submarginal line runs from the costa before the apex to the outer angle. Hindwings whitish. Some pinkish shade found on outer margin below apex in hindwings.

Larval food plants are Eugenia cumini, Eugenia jambos, Eugenia myrobalana, Eucalyptus, Ficus, Memecylon, Cleistocalyx, Bombax ceiba and Syzygium species.
