= Rose apple =

Rose apple may refer to:

- Angophora costata, a common woodland and forest tree of Eastern Australia
- Various Syzygium species, especially the following:
  - Syzygium aqueum, Watery rose apple
  - Syzygium jambos, Rose apple or jamb
  - Syzygium malaccense, Malay rose apple
  - Syzygium samarangense, Java rose apple
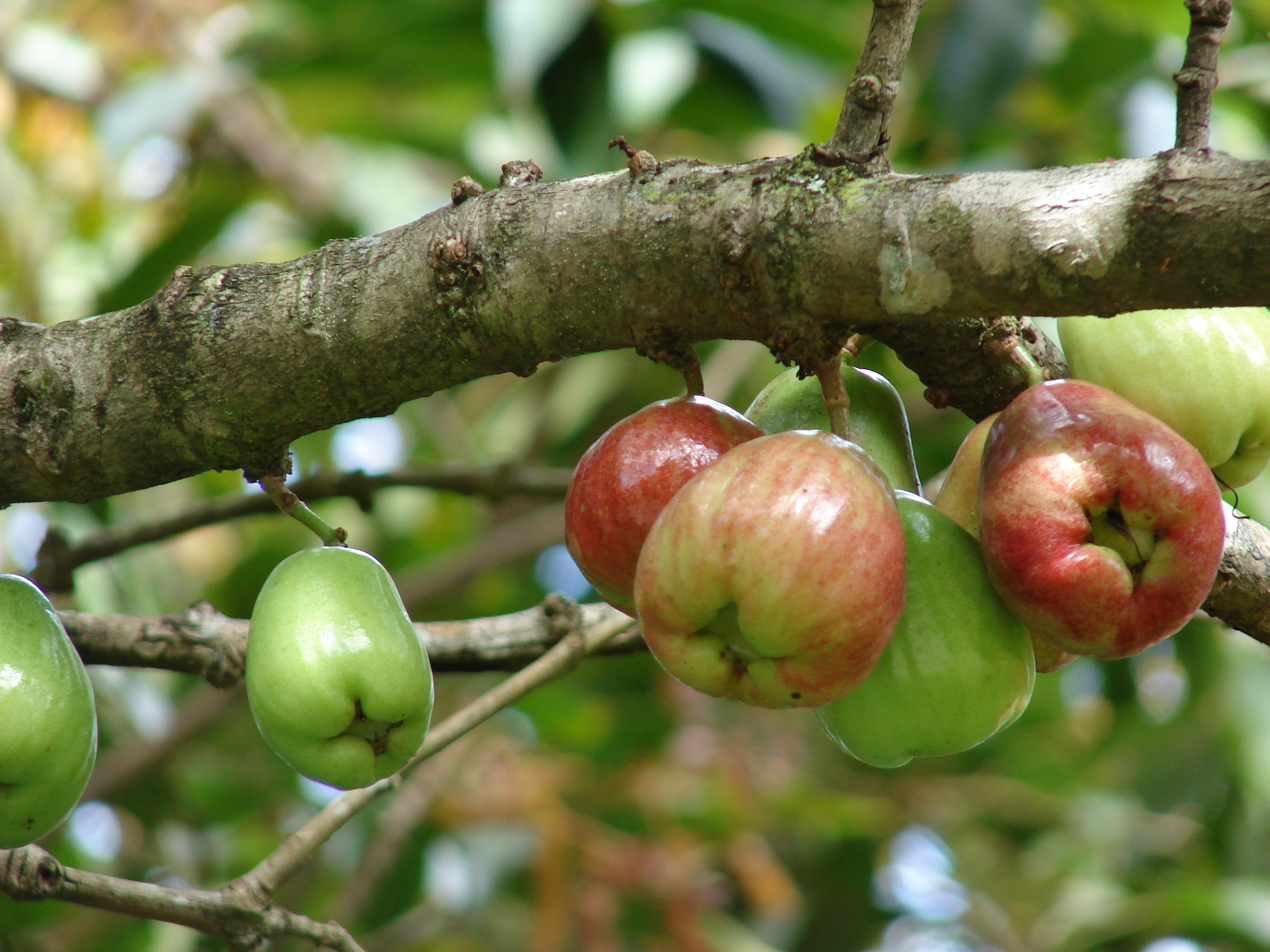
fruit of Syzygium malaccense

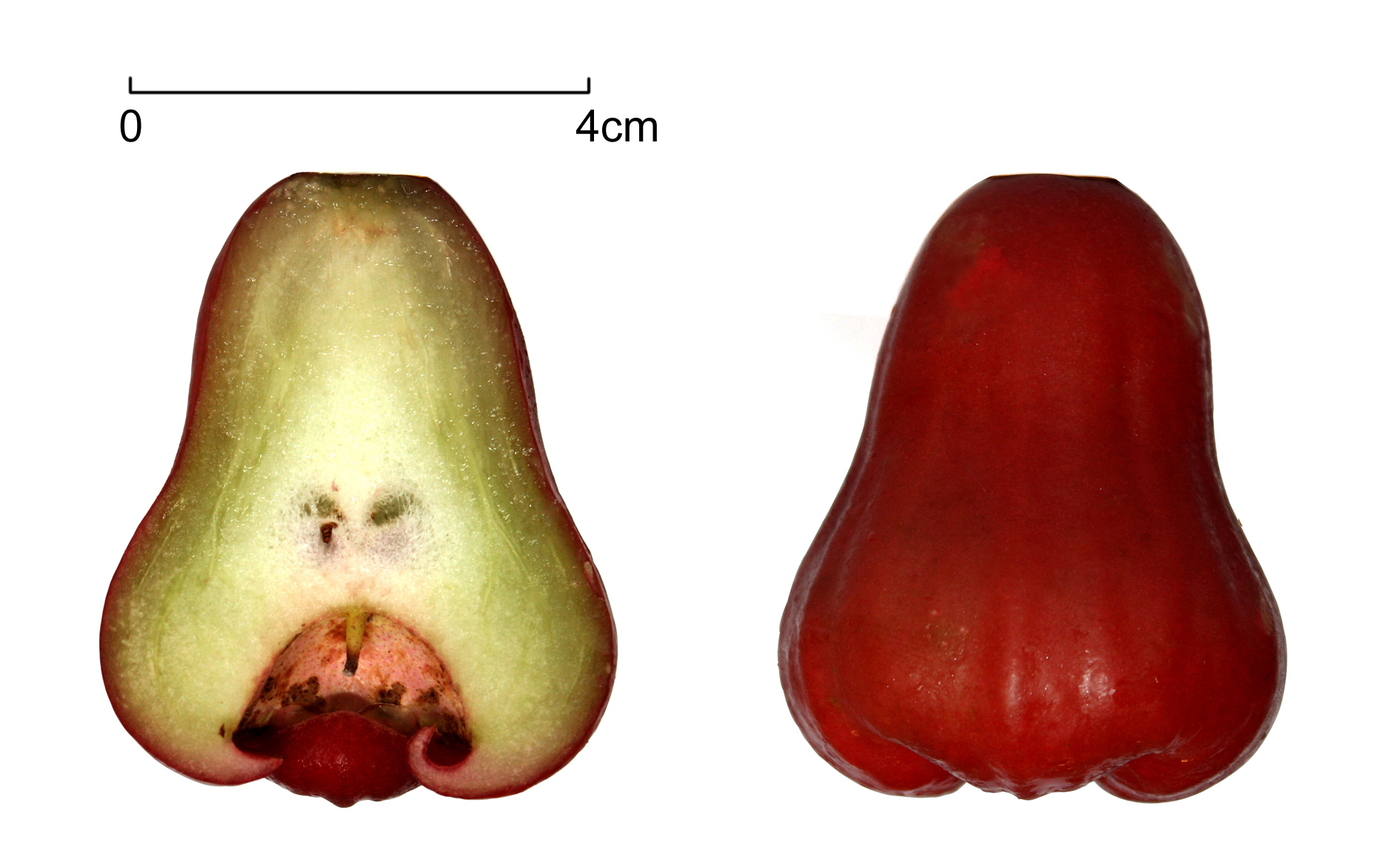
fruit of Syzygium samarangense

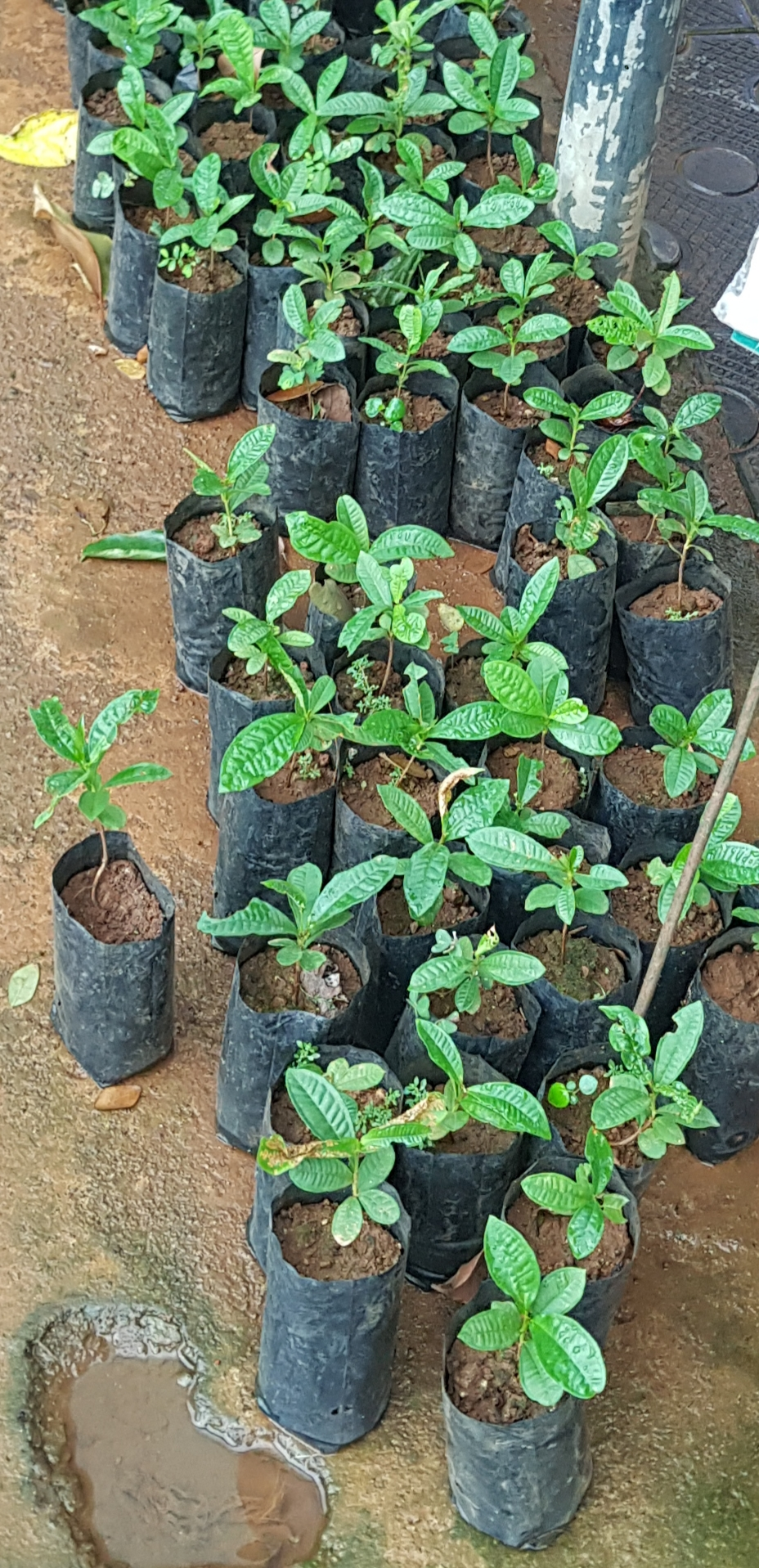
Rose apple saplings
