= Eduard Lucas =

German pomologist

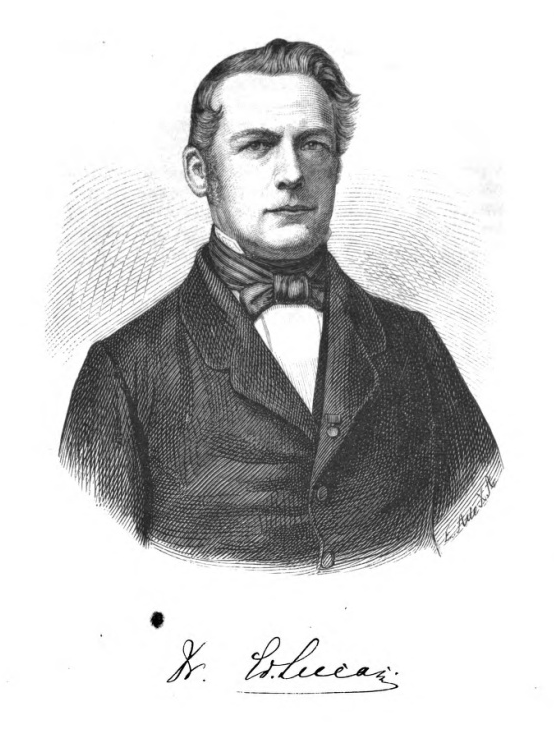
Eduard Lucas

Eduard Lucas (19 July 1816, in Erfurt – 23 June 1882, in Reutlingen) was a German pomologist.

He worked at the botanical gardens in Munich (from 1838) and Regensburg (from 1841), and from 1843 taught classes at the Agricultural and Forestry Institute in Hohenheim. Around 1860 he founded the Pomological Institute in Reutlingen.

With Johann Georg Conrad Oberdieck, he was editor of the Monatsschrift für Pomologie und praktischen Obstbau ("Monthly journal of pomology and practical fruit growing", 1855–64); later known as the Illustrirte Monatshefte für Obst- und Weinbau (1865–74) and the Pomologische Monatshefte (from 1875 onward). With Oberdieck and Friedrich Jahn, he was editor of the 8-volume Illustrirtes Handbuch der Obstkunde ("Illustrated Handbook of Pomology"; 1859–75).

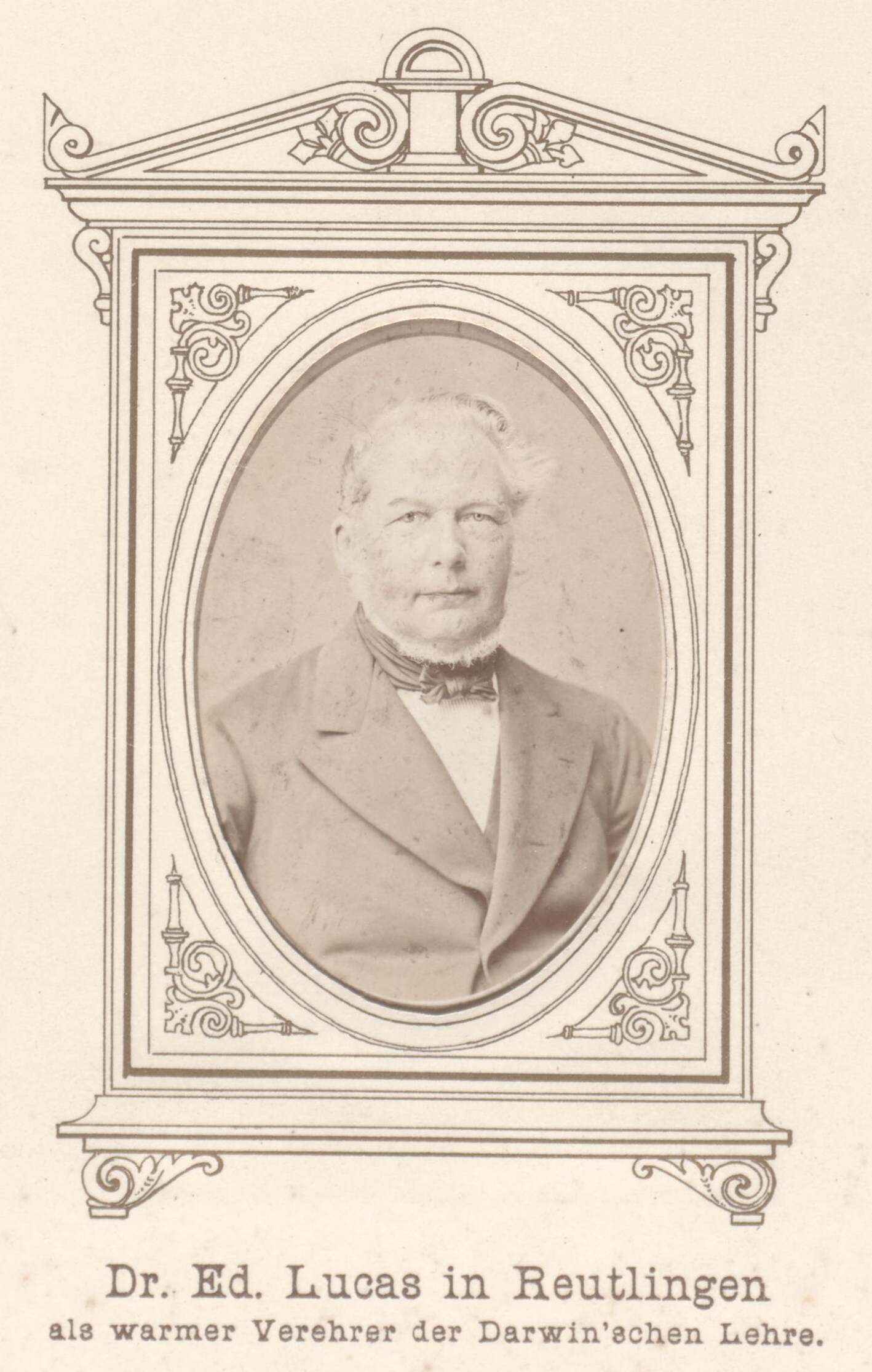
c. 1876

He is credited for improving and expanding upon the fruit classification system earlier developed by Adrian Diel. Several fruit varieties bear his name, such as the Lucas Gestreifter Rosenapfel (Lucas striped rose apple), Lucas Königspflaume (Lucas king plum) and Lucas Taubenapfel (Lucas pigeon apple). The Eduard-Lucas-Medaille is an award offered by the Verein zur Erhaltung und Förderung alter Obstsorten (Association for the Conservation and Promotion of Old Fruit Varieties).

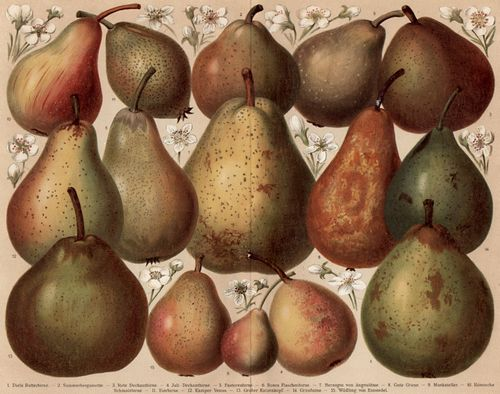
Pear varieties according to the pomological system of Lucas

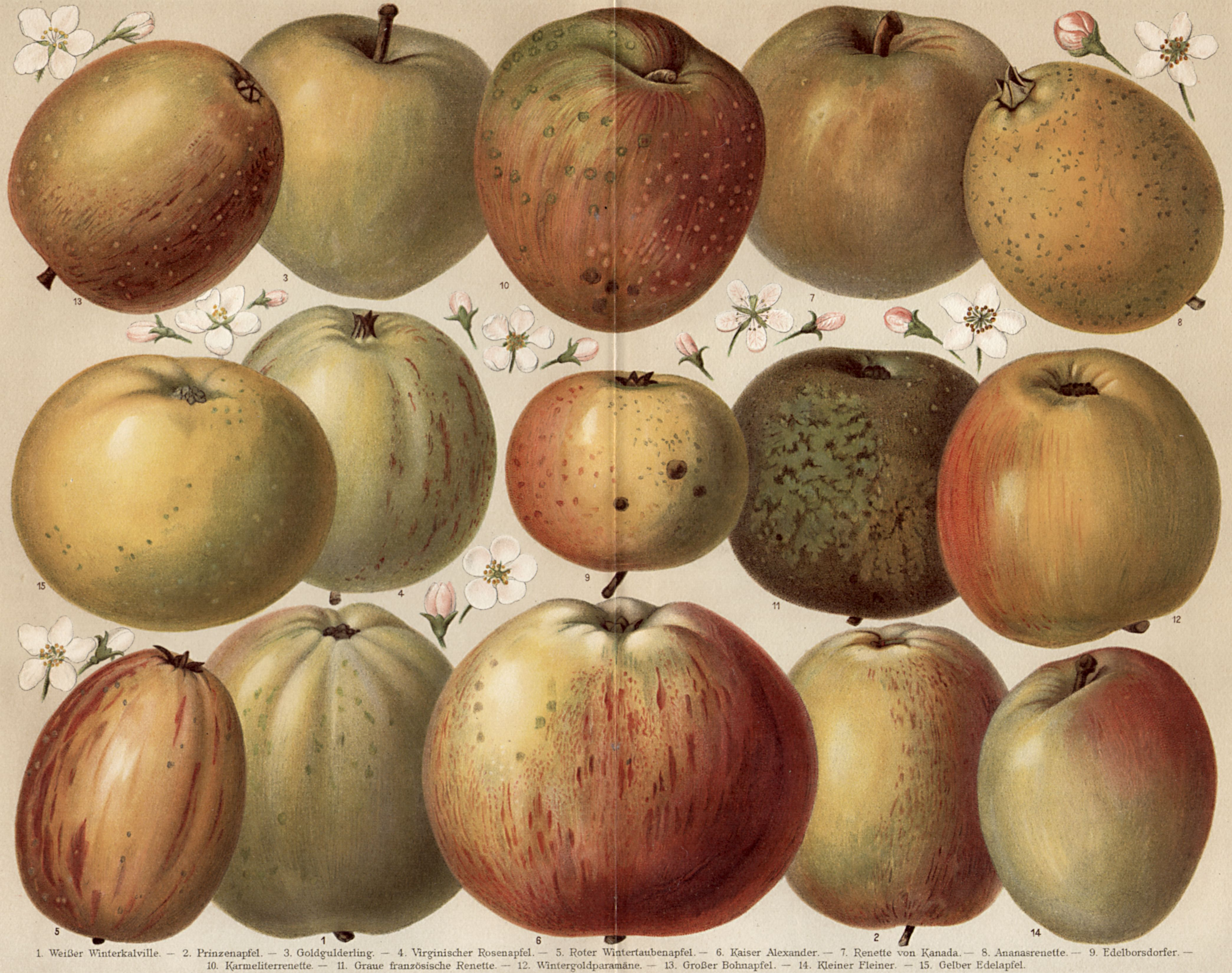
Apple varieties (Diel-Lucas system)

== Selected works ==
- Die Lehre von der Obstbaumzucht auf einfache Gesetze zurückgeführt, 1844 – Doctrine of fruit arboriculture attributed to simple laws.
- Populäre Anleitung zum ländlichen Gartenbau als Mittel zu Erhöhung des Wohlstandes und zur Landesverschönerung, 1849 – Popular instructions for rural gardening as a means to increase prosperity and for land beautification.
- Ueber die Mängel und Hindernisse des Obstbau’s und über die Mittel zu deren Abhülfe mit besonderer Berücksichtigung der rauheren Gegenden Württembergs, 1853 – On shortcomings and obstacles of arboriculture and on the means of remedy, with special consideration to the rougher areas of Württemberg.
- Beiträge zur Hebung der Obstcultur, 1857 (with Johann Georg Conrad Oberdieck) – Contributions to improve fruit cultivation.
- Die Lehre vom Baumschnitt für die deutschen Gärten bearbeitet, 1867 – Doctrine of pruning for German gardens.
- Vollständiges Handbuch der Obstcultur, 1869, new editions titled Lucas’ Anleitung zum Obstbau ("Lucas' instructions for fruit production"); 22nd edition, 2002.
