= Johann Georg Conrad Oberdieck =

German theologian

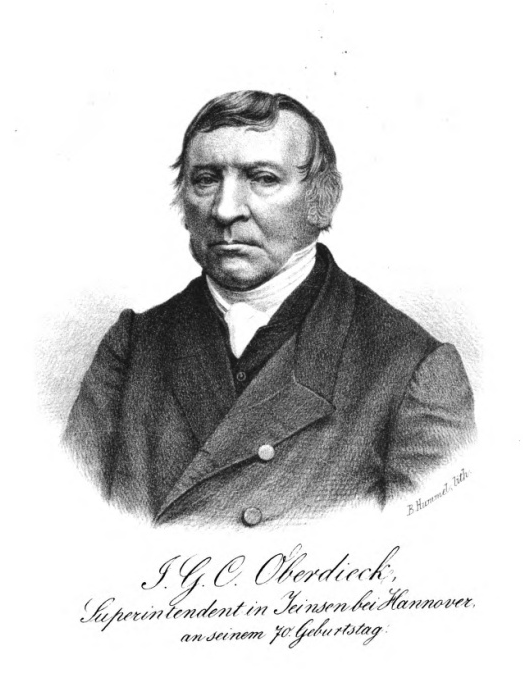
Johann Georg Conrad Oberdieck

Johann Georg Conrad Oberdieck (30 August 1794, in Wilkenburg – 24 February 1880, in Herzberg am Harz) was a German clergyman and pomologist.

From 1812 to 1815 he studied theology at the University of Göttingen, and following graduation, served as a subconrector at Michaelisschule in Lüneburg. Several years later he became a pastor in Bardowick, and afterwards worked as an ecclesiastical superintendent in Sulingen (from 1831) and Nienburg/Weser (from 1839). In 1853 he relocated to the community of Jeinsen as a superintendent.

With Eduard Lucas, he was editor of the journal Monatsschrift für Pomologie und praktischen Obstbau ("Monthly journal of pomology and practical fruit growing"), later known as the Pomologische Monatshefte. The Oberdieck-Preis is an annual award issued by the Pomologen-Verein eV and the city of Naumburg (Hesse) for achievements made towards conservation of plant genetic resources in fruit cultivation. The fruit cultivars Oberdieck's taubenapfel (a pigeon-apple) and Oberdieck's reinette (a rennet) commemorate his name.

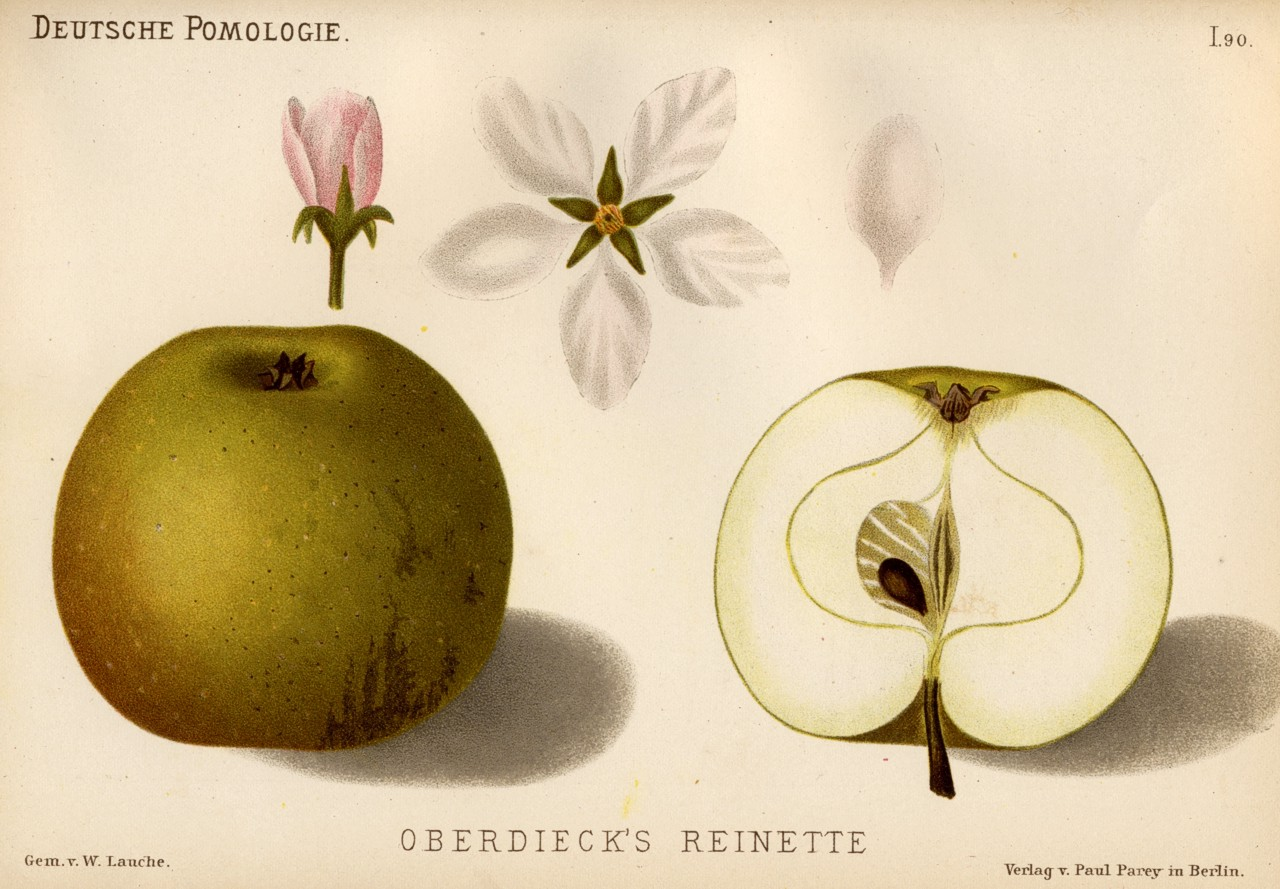
Oberdieck's reinette (1882–83)

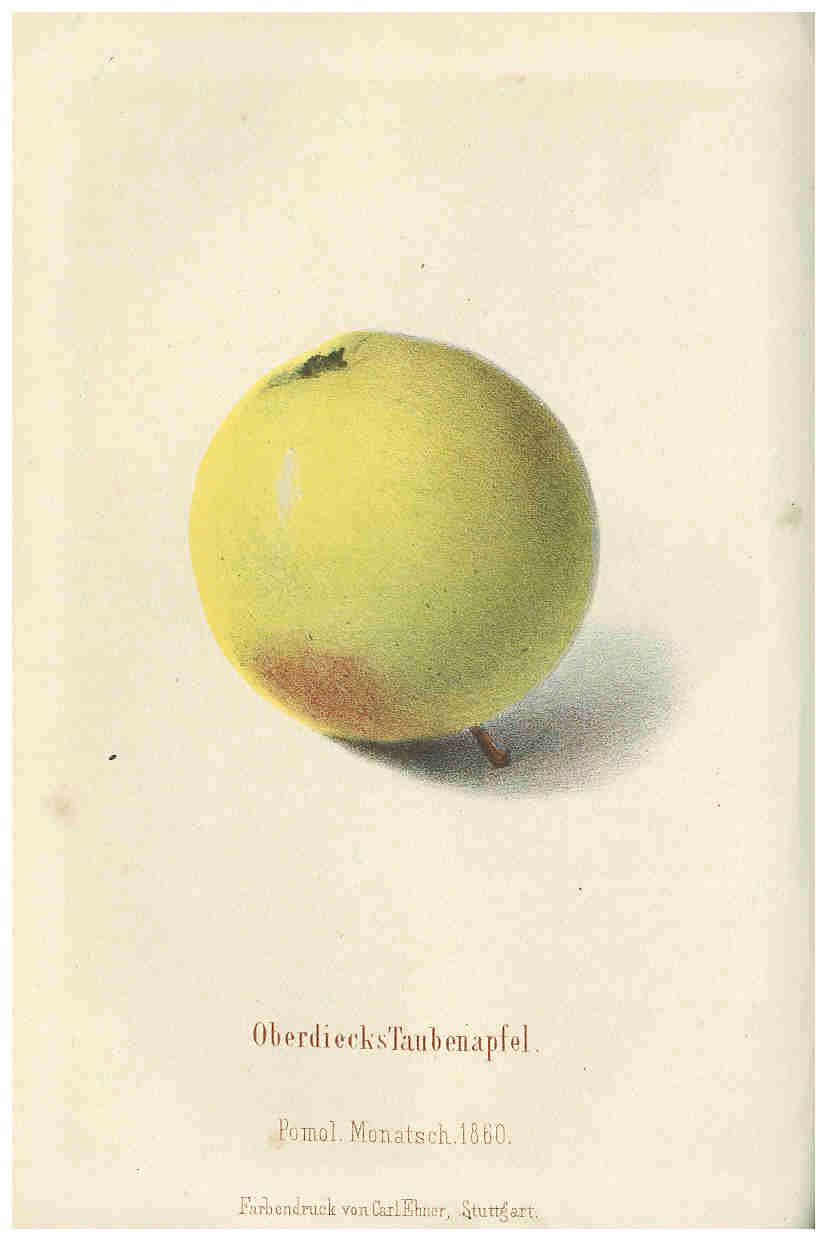
Oberdieck's taubenapfel (1860)

== Selected works ==
- Anleitung zur Kenntniß und Anpflanzung des besten Obstes für das nördliche Deutschland, 1852 – Instructions on planting the best fruit for northern Germany.
- Beiträge zur Hebung der Obstcultur (with Eduard Lucas, 1857) – Contributions to fruit cultivation.
- Zusätze und Berichtigungen zu Band I. und IV. des Illustr. Handbuchs der Obstkunde, enthaltend Beschreibungen von Aepfeln, 1868 – Additions and corrections to Volume I and IV of the Illustrated Manual of Pomology, containing descriptions of apples.
- Pomologische Notizen. Nach langjährigen eigenen Erfahrungen zusammengestellt, 1869 – Pomological notes. Compiled via longtime personal experiences.
- Beobachtungen über das Erfrieren vieler Gewächse in kalten Wintern; nebst Erörterung der Mittel, durch welche Frostschaden möglichst verhütet werden kann, 1872 – Observations on the freezing of many plants in cold winters, etc.
- Illustrirtes Handbuch der Obstkunde (with Eduard Lucas and Friedrich Jahn; 8 volumes 1859–75) – Illustrated handbook of pomology.
- Deutschlands beste Obstsorten; Anleitung zur Kenntnis und Anpflanzung einer, nach strenger Auswahl zusammengestellten Anzahl von Obstsorten, 1881 – Germany's best fruit; instructive notes and cultivation, etc.
