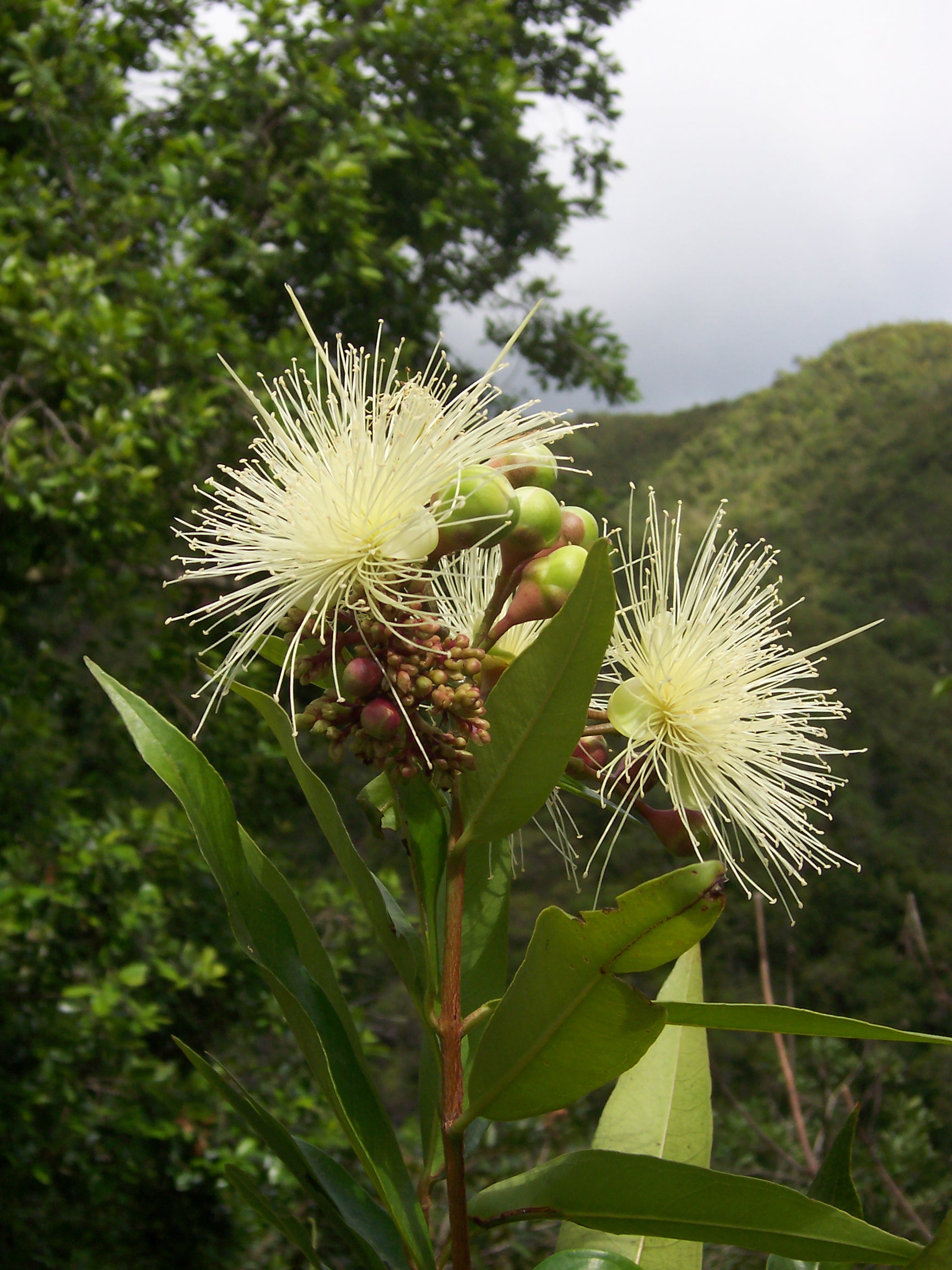

Conservation status
- Least Concern (IUCN 3.1)

Scientific classification
- Kingdom: Plantae
- Clade: Tracheophytes
- Clade: Angiosperms
- Clade: Eudicots
- Clade: Rosids
- Order: Myrtales
- Family: Myrtaceae
- Genus: Syzygium
- Species: S. jambos

Binomial name
- Syzygium jambos (L.) Alston

Synonyms
- Synonymy: Eugenia decora Salisb.; Eugenia jamboides Wender.; Eugenia jambos L.; Eugenia jambosa Crantz; Eugenia malaccensis Blanco, nom. illeg. homonym. post.; Eugenia malaccensis Lour., nom. illeg. homonym. post.; Eugenia malaccensis f. cericarpa (O.Deg.) H.St.John; Eugenia monantha Merr.; Eugenia vulgaris Baill.; Jambosa jambos (L.) Millsp.; Jambosa leptostachya Blume; Jambosa malaccensis f. cericarpa O.Deg.; Jambosa palembanica Blume; Jambosa vulgaris DC., nom. illeg.; Myrtus jambos (L.) Kunth; Plinia jambos (L.) M.Gómez; Syzygium jambos var. linearilimbum H.T.Chang & R.H.Miao; Syzygium leptostachyum (Blume) Merr. & L.M.Perry; Syzygium merrillii Masam., nom. illeg. superfl.; Syzygium monanthum (Merr.) Merr. & L.M.Perry

= Syzygium jambos =

Species of fruit and plant

Rose-apples, raw
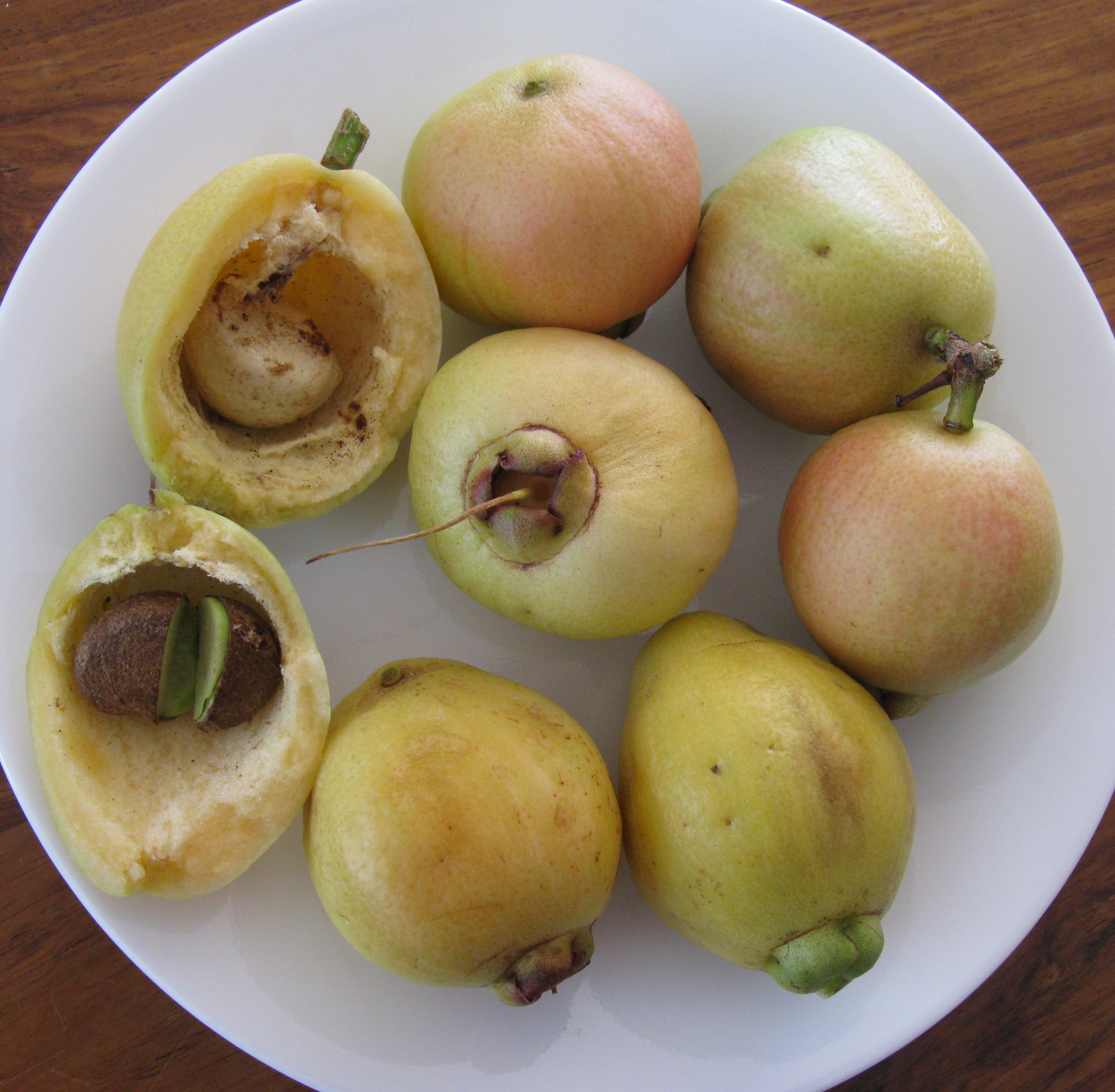
- Fruit and seeds. One fruit is split to show seeds.

Nutritional value per 100 g (3.5 oz)
- Energy: 105 kJ (25 kcal)
- Carbohydrates: 5.7 g
- Fat: 0.3 g
- Protein: 0.6 g
Vitamins and minerals
| Vitamins | Quantity %DV^{†} |
| Vitamin A equiv. | 2% 17 μg |
| Thiamine (B1) | 2% 0.02 mg |
| Riboflavin (B2) | 2% 0.03 mg |
| Niacin (B3) | 5% 0.8 mg |
| Vitamin C | 25% 22.3 mg |
| Minerals | Quantity %DV^{†} |
| Calcium | 2% 29 mg |
| Iron | 0% 0.07 mg |
| Magnesium | 1% 5 mg |
| Manganese | 1% 0.029 mg |
| Phosphorus | 1% 8 mg |
| Potassium | 4% 123 mg |
| Sodium | 0% 0 mg |
| Zinc | 1% 0.06 mg |
- Link to USDA Database entry
- ^{†}Percentages estimated using US recommendations for adults, except for potassium, which is estimated based on expert recommendation from the National Academies.

Syzygium jambos is a species of rose apple originating in Southeast Asia and occurring widely elsewhere, having been introduced as an ornamental and fruit tree.

== Description ==
Syzygium jambos is a large evergreen shrub or small-to-medium-sized tree, typically 3 to 15 metres (10 to 49 feet) high, with a tendency to low branching. Its leaves and twigs are glabrous and the bark, though dark brown, is fairly smooth too, with little relief or texture. The leaves are lanceolate, 2 to 4 centimetres (3/4 to 1 5/8 inches) broad, 10 to 20 cm (4 to 8 in) long, pointed, base cuneate with hardly any petiole, lively red when growing, but dark, glossy green on attaining full size. The flowers are in small terminal clusters, white or greenish white, the long, numerous stamens giving them a diameter of 5–8 cm (2–3 1/4 in). In temperate regions the tree is summer-flowering.

The fruit is shaped like some kinds of guava; in fact, the fruit is so like the guava in appearance that people unfamiliar with it may mistake it for a guava on sight. However, the fragrance, flavour and texture are different, and instead of containing dozens of small, hard seeds set in a jelly-like tissue, as a guava does, the fruit of S. jambos usually contains one or two large, unarmoured seeds about 1 cm in diameter, lying loose in a slightly fluffy cavity when ripe. Shaking a fruit to feel whether the seeds rattle, gives some indication whether it is ripe. The skin is thin and waxy. The flowers are described by some as fragrant, though this appears to be a variable attribute. The ripe fruit, however, has a strong, pleasant floral bouquet, hence such common names as "Rose apple" and "pomarrosa".

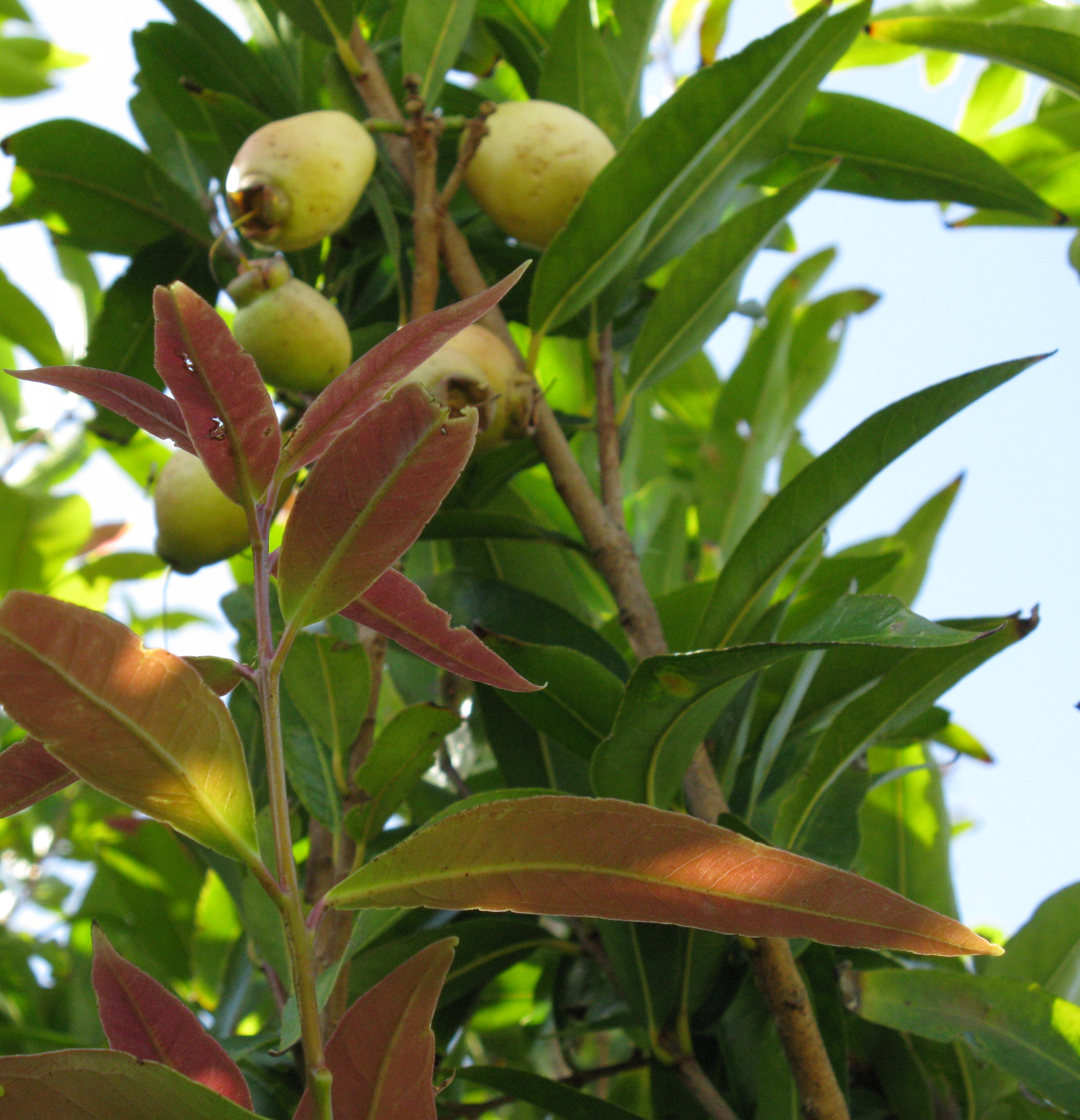
Branches, foliage and fruit

Leaves and fruit

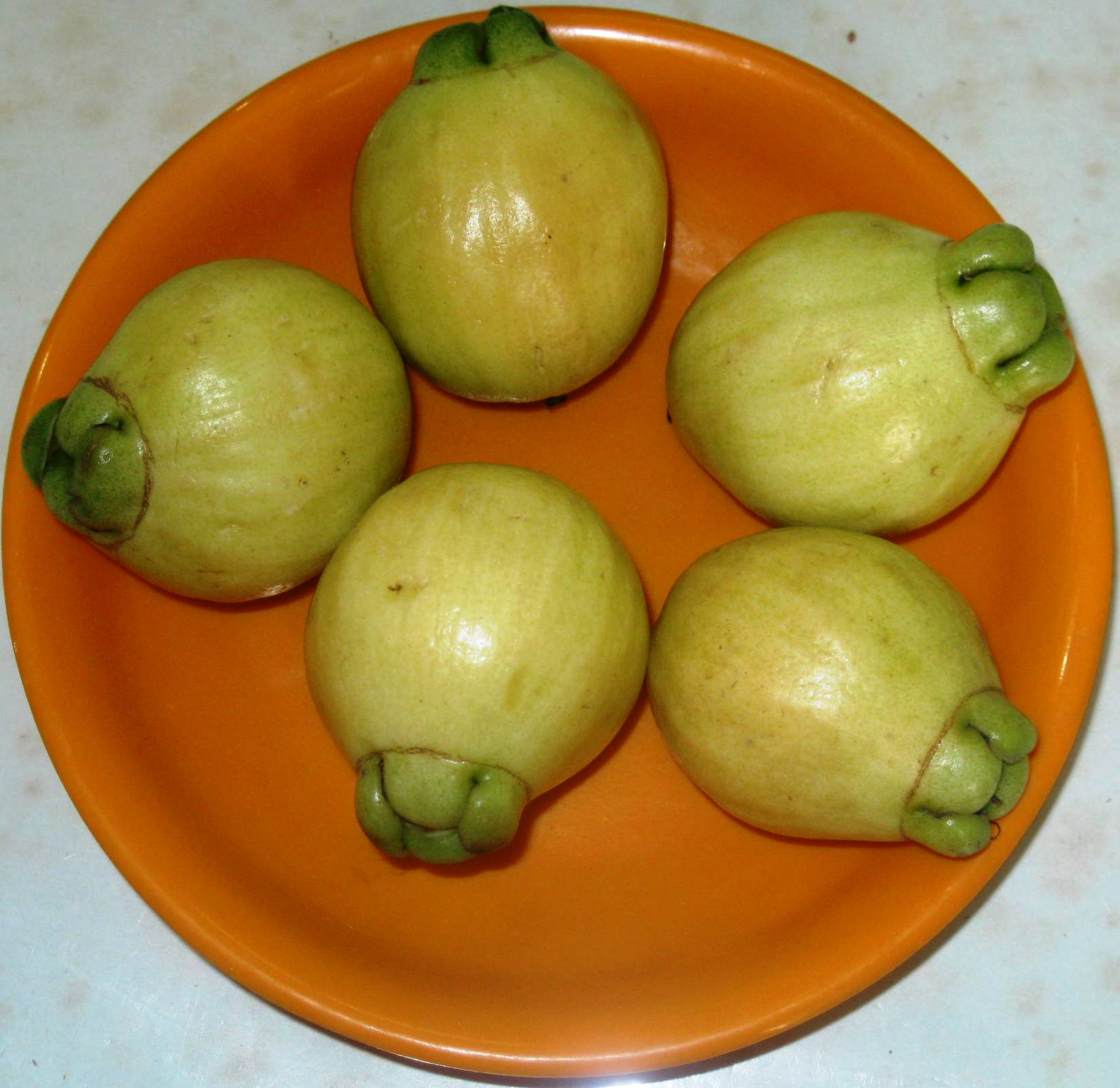
Rose-apples, ripe

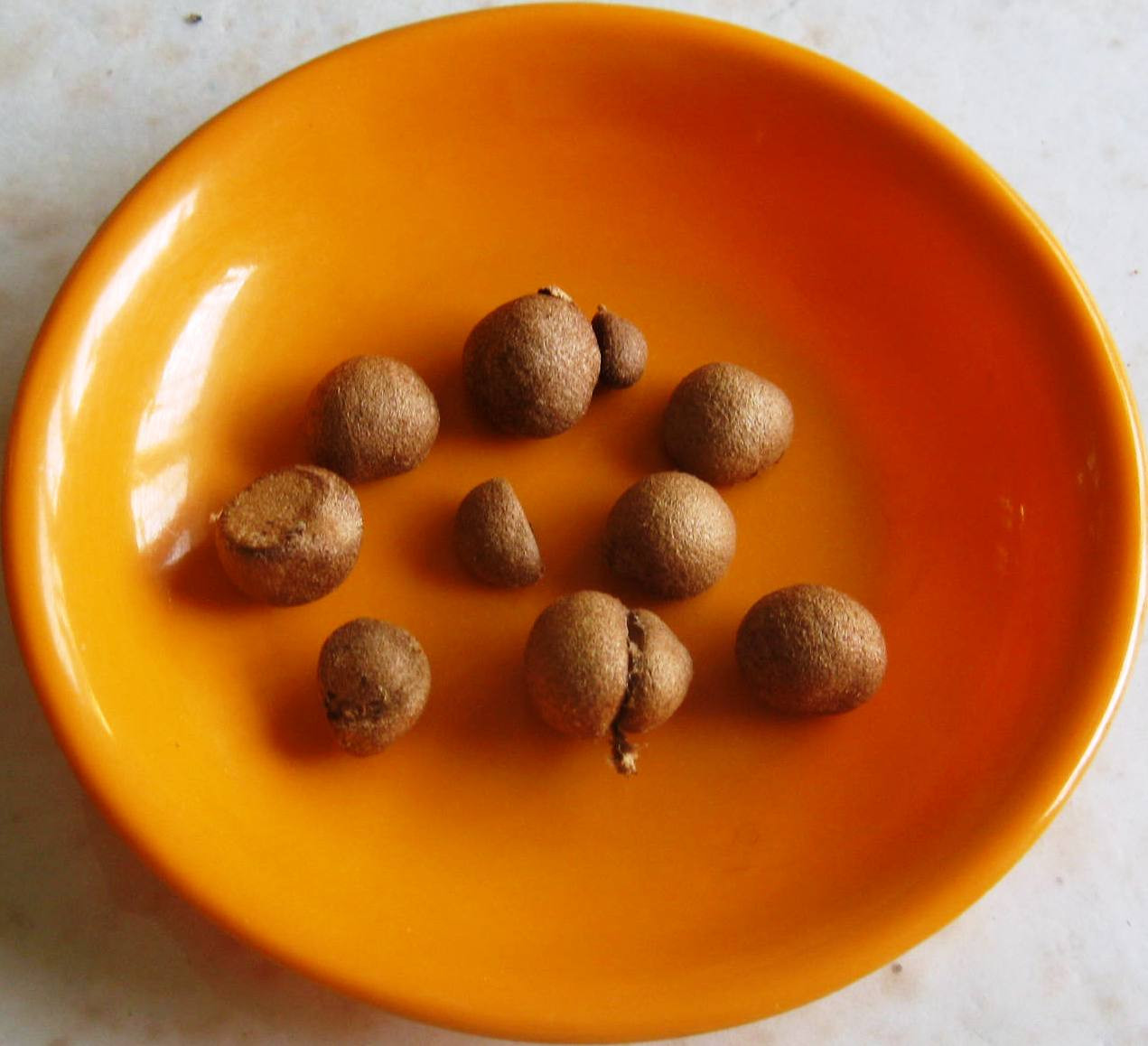
Rose-apple seeds

== Taxonomy ==
=== Botanical names ===
Syzygium jambos

- Family: Myrtaceae
- Genus: Syzygium
- Species: jambos
- Synonym: Eugenia jambos
- Synonym: Jambosa jambos
- Synonym: Jambosa vulgaris
- Synonym: Myrtus jambos

The tree has variously been allocated to the genus Jambosa, Eugenia and Syzygium, where it now seems to have been permanently accepted. There have been a few species ascribed to it, but currently several varieties with various fruit colours all are recognised as Syzygium jambos.

=== Common names ===
Syzygium jambos has several common names, reflecting the large number of regions in which it occurs as a garden or fruit tree or as an invader. The names include ಪನ್ನೇರಳೆ , Guljamun , madhura nelli, Malabar Plum, Panineer Champakka, Mountain Apple (champoo), chom pu or chom-phu. Terms like "plum rose", "water apple", "pera de agua", "Cloud apple", "Wax apple", "Malay apple", "jambrosade", "PauTêe"(Penang Hokkien spelled with Taiwanese Romanisation System), "pomarrosa", or the English equivalent, "rose apple". Several of these names are applied to other species of Syzygium, while "jambu" can also mean a guava. The name Jambu for this fruit is in all likelihood limited to one or two of the twenty-odd major Indian languages, while most other languages use similar words (Jaamun, Jaambhool, etc.) for another fruit, smaller than the rose apple, and dark purple in colour like the fruit of the eggplant. In Bangla, the fruit is called "golap-jaam" (Bengali: গোলাপজাম) and in Odia, it is called "golapajamu" (Odia: ଗୋଲାପଜାମୁ), which literally translate to "rose jaamun", in reference to its distinct aroma. In Karnataka, the English common name is "rose apple", and the vernacular name is Pannerale (Kannada: ಪನ್ನೇರಳೆ; Panneer hannu), while the name for the other one is Nerale. Such a confusion of common names in horticulture is nothing unusual.

In Myanmar, it is called Lily fruit (နှင်းသီး).

In the Philippines, it is locally called as yambo, dambo or tampoy. Always confused with macopa, a closely related fruit (Syzygium samarangense), Syzygium jambos is not widely cultivated and can only be encountered in rural areas. It is the namesake of Lake Yambo, one of the Seven Lakes of San Pablo City, Laguna

In Maldives, it is called Jambu in Dhivehi, and its cousin fruit is called Jamburol, the water apple or wax apple.

It is also known as বগী জামুক Bogi Jamuk /গোলাপী জামু Gulapi jamu in Assamese.

In Brazil, the fruit is called jambo.

=== Varieties ===
There are many varieties of S. jambos worldwide, including undistinguished feral trees. In Thailand, the most common cultivated variety bears a pale green fruit. Malaysian varieties generally have red skins. In many regions, the fruit is a shade of pale yellow, often with a slight blush. The skin is thin and waxy, and the hollow core contains a small amount of insignificant fluff. The flesh is crisp and watery, and the taste is characteristic, which leads to some fanciful descriptions, such as: "like a cross between nashi and bell pepper, with a very mild rose scent and a slightly bitter aftertaste."

== Distribution and habitat ==
Syzygium jambos is native to Indochina (Cambodia, Laos, Myanmar, Thailand, and Vietnam), western Malesia (Peninsular Malaysia, Borneo, Sumatra, and the Lesser Sunda Islands), and southern Yunnan in south-central China.

It has also been introduced widely on every continent except Antarctica, and it has become established and invasive in several regions. Concern has been expressed because of the threat to various ecosystems, including those on several Hawaiian islands, Réunion, Pitcairn, the Galápagos Islands, parts of Australia and the warmer regions of the Americas. However, in Hawaii, it has been almost wiped out by the introduced rust Puccinia psidii.

== Uses ==
Rich in vitamin C, the fruit can be eaten raw or cooked in various regional recipes. In South-East Asian countries, rose apple fruit is frequently served with spiced sugar.

The wood is dense and accordingly is used as a source of charcoal.

The tree is variously rich in tannins that are of some antimicrobial interest. Some parts of the tree are used in regional traditional medicine.
