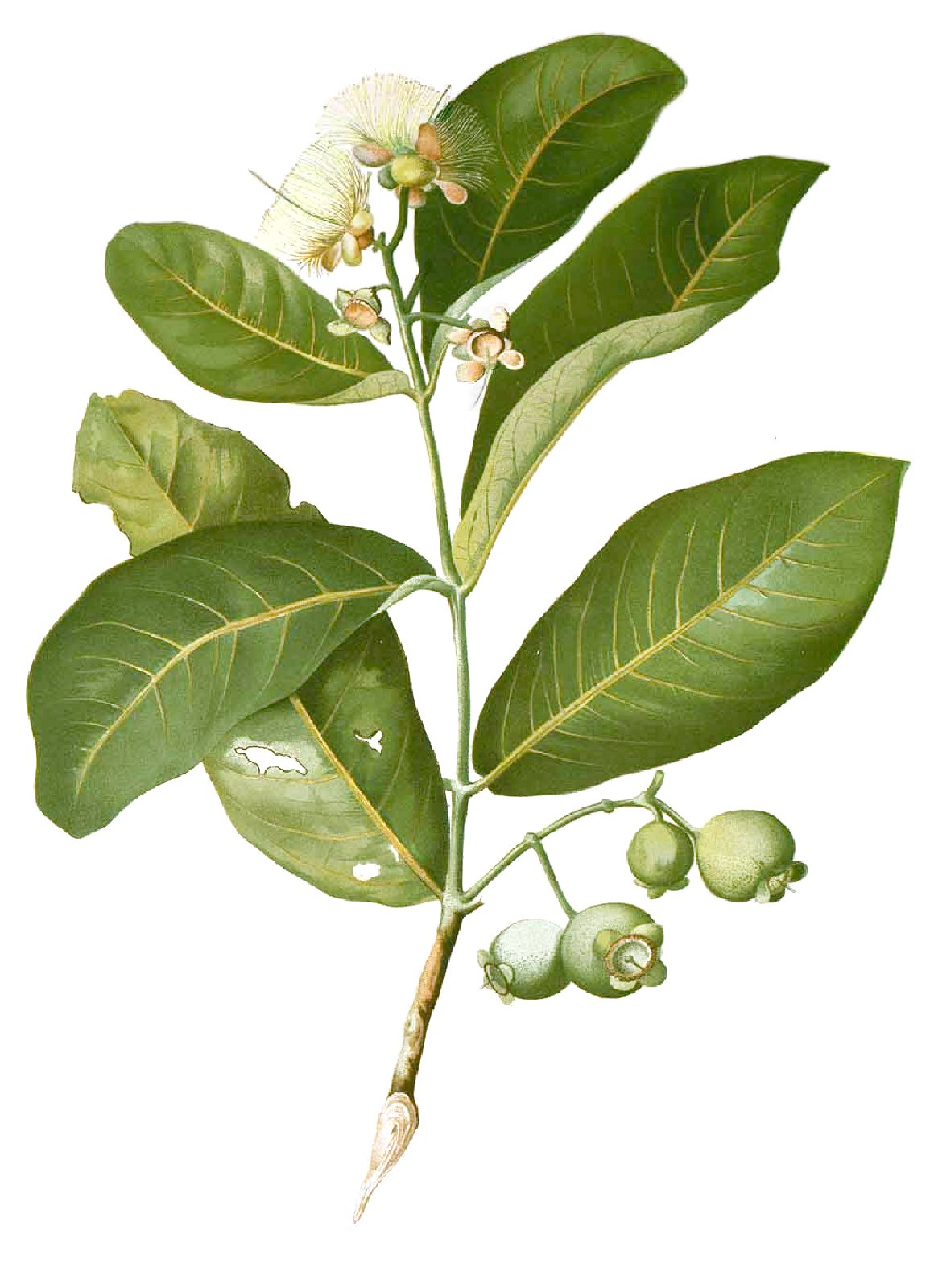

Conservation status
- Least Concern (IUCN 3.1)
- Rare (NCA)

Scientific classification
- Kingdom: Plantae
- Clade: Tracheophytes
- Clade: Angiosperms
- Clade: Eudicots
- Clade: Rosids
- Order: Myrtales
- Family: Myrtaceae
- Genus: Syzygium
- Species: S. aqueum

Binomial name
- Syzygium aqueum (Burm.f.) Alston

Synonyms
- Eugenia aquea Burm.f.; Jambosa aquea (Burm.f.) DC.; Malidra aquea (Burm.f.) Raf.; Cerocarpus aqueus (Burm.f.) Hassk.; Eugenia nodiflora Aubl.; Eugenia javanica Lam.; Myrtus javanica (Lam.) Blume; Eugenia obversa Miq.; Jambosa madagascariensis Blume; Jambosa calophylla Miq.; Eugenia callophylla (Miq.) Reinw. ex de Vriese; Jambosa subsessilis Miq.; Jambosa javanica (Lam.) K.Schum. & Lauterb.; Syzygium obversum (Miq.) Masam.

= Syzygium aqueum =

Species of tree

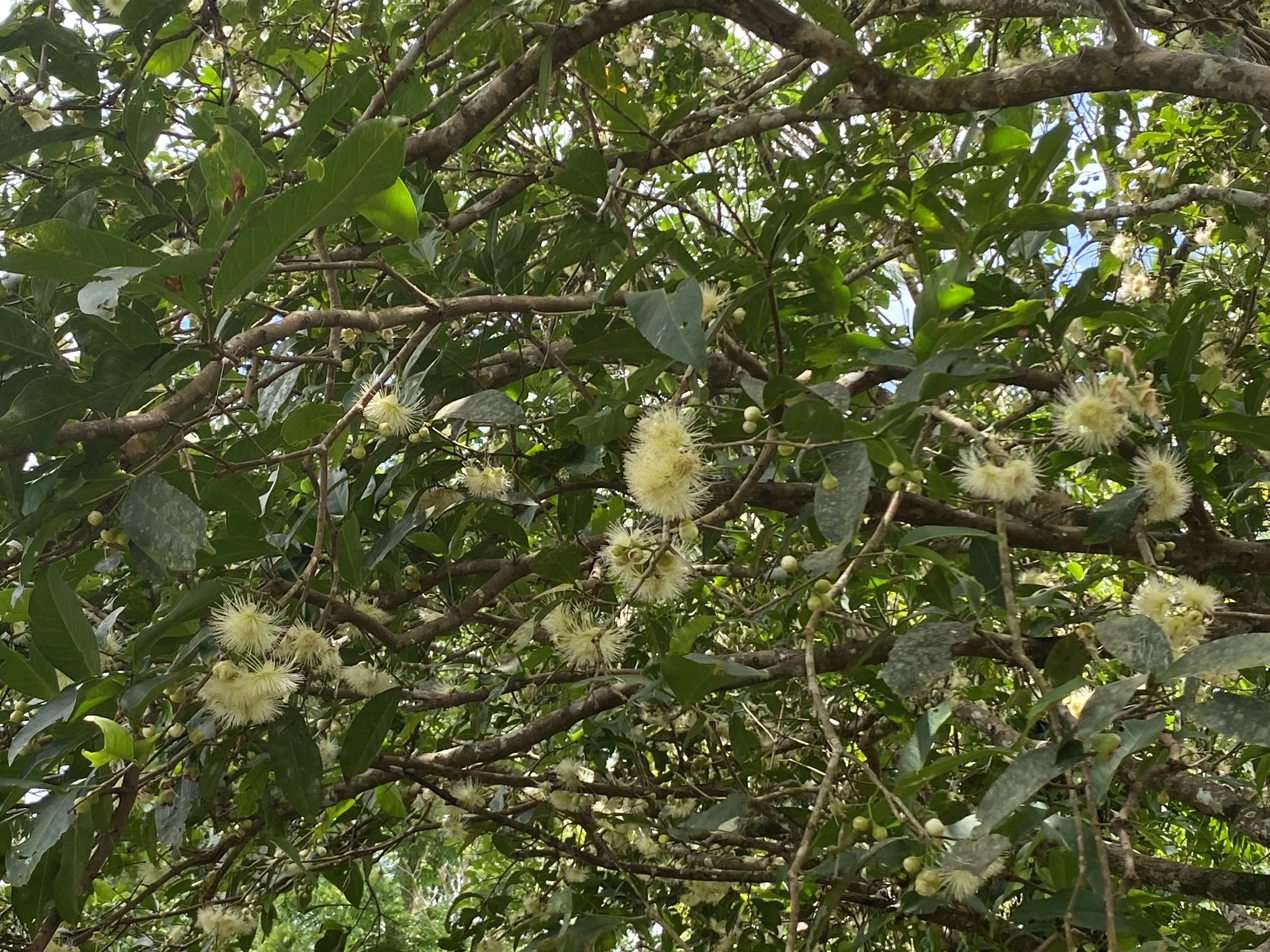
Branch with flowers

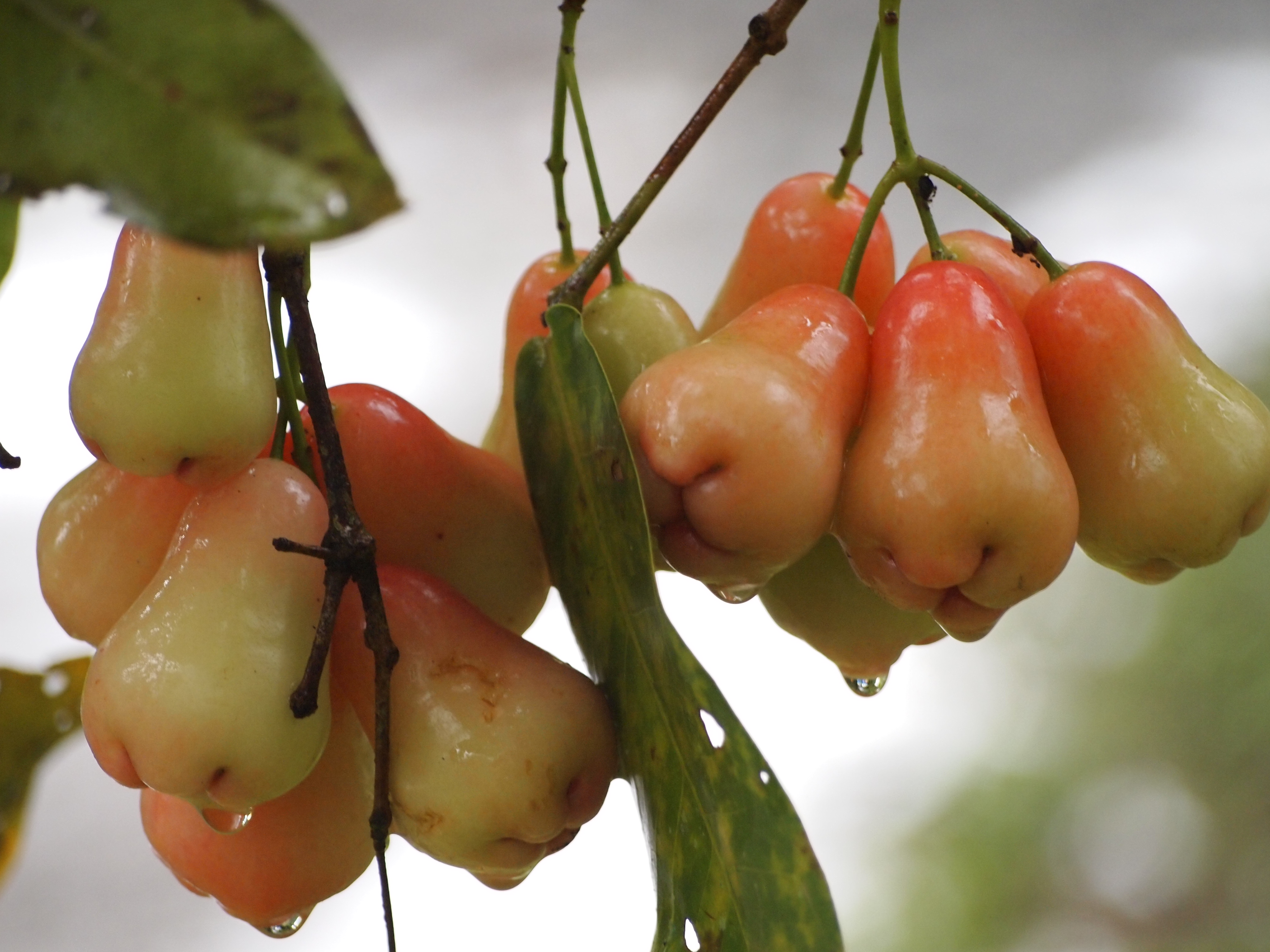
Fruit

Syzygium aqueum is a species of brush cherry tree. Its common names include watery rose apple, water apple and bell fruit, and jambu in Malay and several Indian languages.

The tree is cultivated for its wood and edible fruit. The fruit is a fleshy, whitish-pinkish to yellowish-pinkish or red berry which is bell-shaped, waxy and crisp.

Syzygium aqueum is native to tropical Asia and Queensland. The tree requires heavy rainfalls and can survive in tropical habitats, up to 1600m above sea level. In the Philippines, it is locally known as tambis and is often confused with macopa (Syzygium samarangense).

The wood is durable and suitable for making tools. The bark of the tree is sometimes used in herbal medicines. It is grown in orchards and gardens, and parks as an ornamental plant. The leaves are edible and are sometimes used to wrap food.

The fruit has a delicate, slightly sweet flavor reminiscent of apples, with a crisp, watery texture similar to the inside of a watermelon. It is a staple of Southeast Asian fruit stands, where it is inexpensive while in season. It does not bruise easily and may be preserved for months in a household refrigerator.
