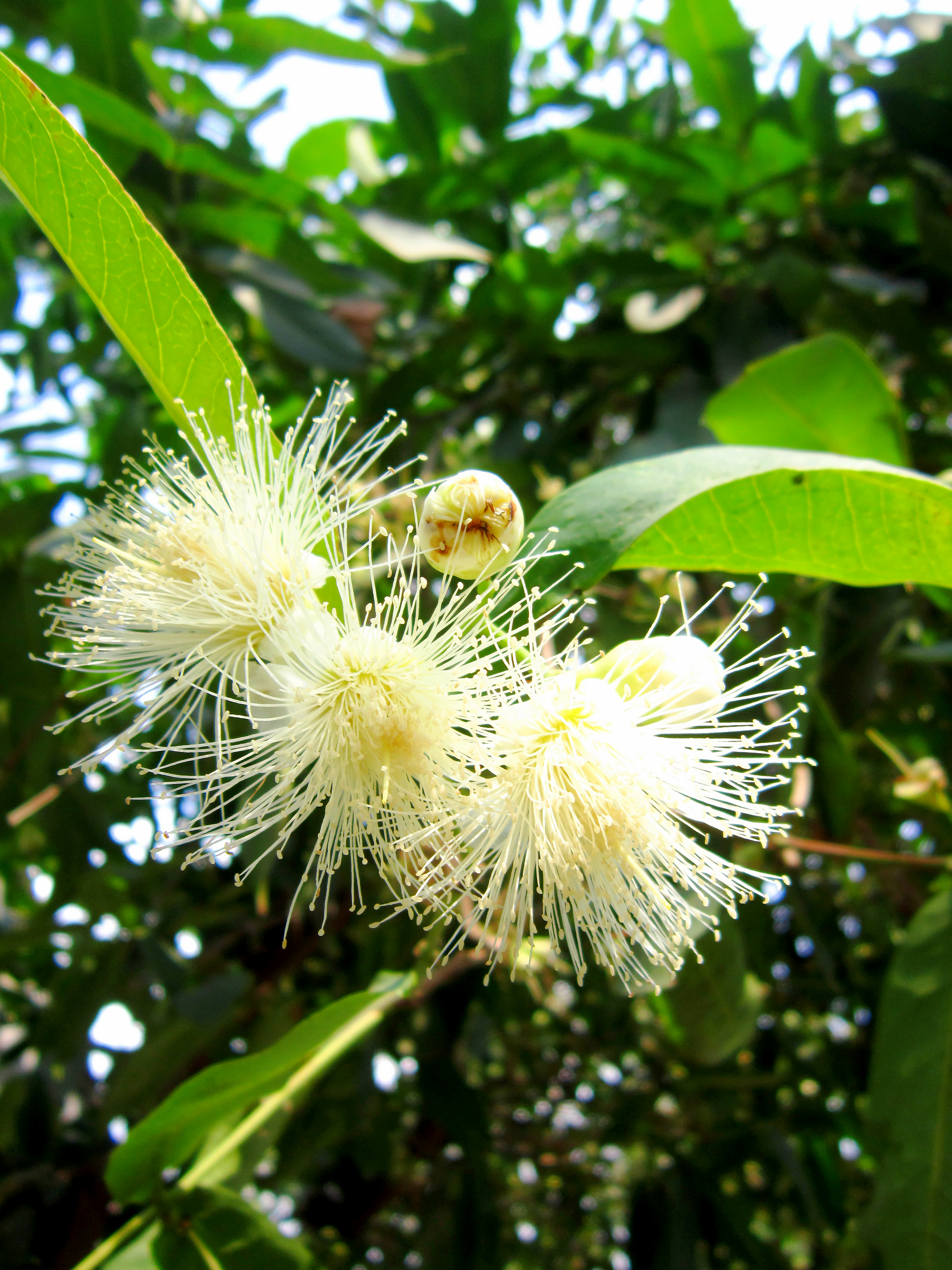

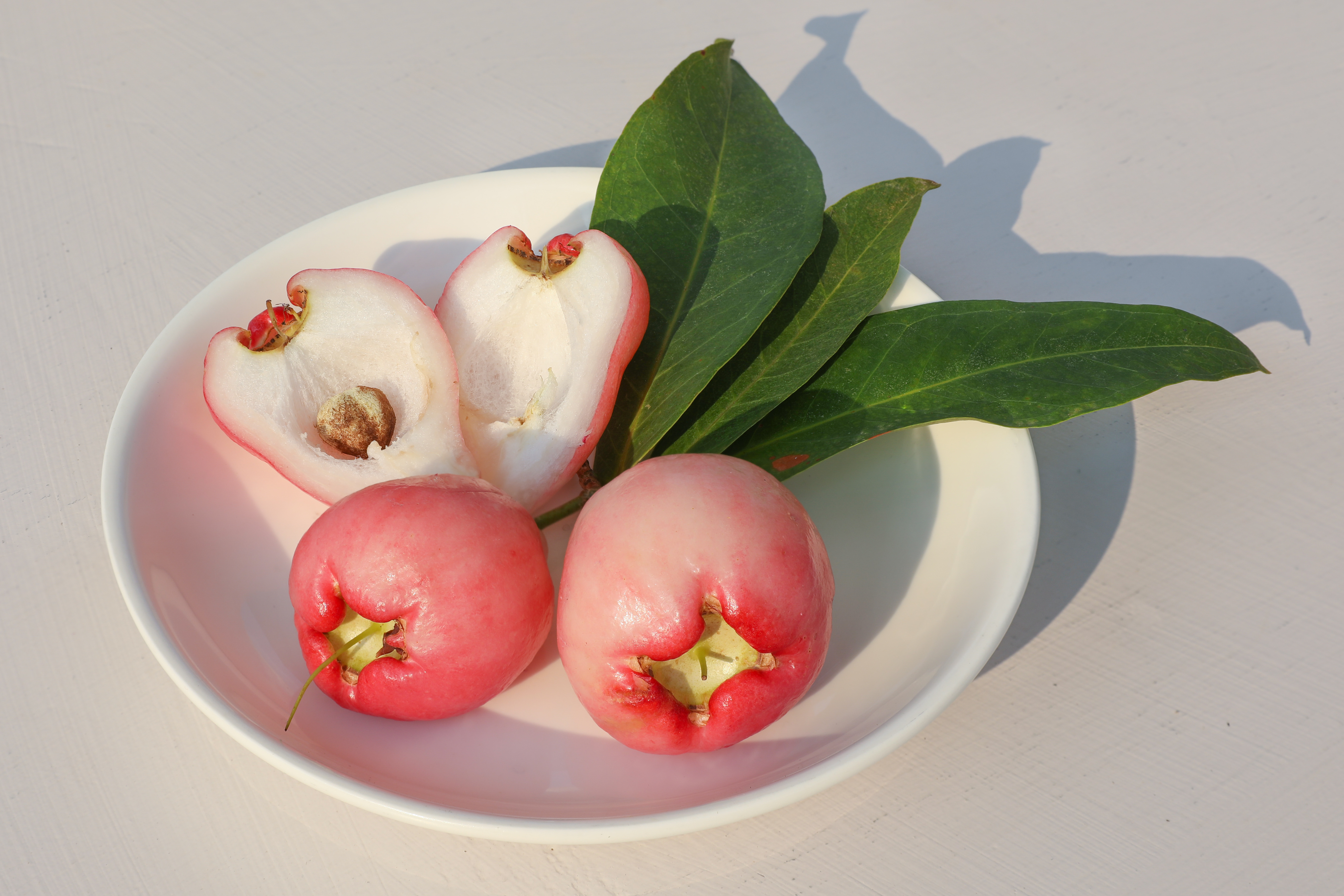

Conservation status
- Least Concern (IUCN 3.1)

Scientific classification
- Kingdom: Plantae
- Clade: Tracheophytes
- Clade: Angiosperms
- Clade: Eudicots
- Clade: Rosids
- Order: Myrtales
- Family: Myrtaceae
- Genus: Syzygium
- Species: S. samarangense

Binomial name
- Syzygium samarangense (Blume) Merr. & L.M.Perry

Synonyms
- List: Myrtus samarangensis Blume; Jambosa samarangensis (Blume) DC.; Eugenia samarangensis (Blume) O.Berg; Myrtus obtusissima Blume; Jambosa obtusissima (Blume) DC.; Eugenia alba Roxb.; Jambosa alba (Roxb.) G.Don; Jambosa ambigua Blume; Jambosa timorensis Blume; Eugenia mindanaensis C.B.Rob.

= Syzygium samarangense =

Species of Asian fruit tree in the myrtle family

Syzygium samarangense is a species of flowering plant in the family Myrtaceae, native to an area that includes the Greater Sunda Islands, Malay Peninsula, and the Andaman and Nicobar Islands, but introduced in prehistoric times to a wider area and now widely cultivated in the tropics. Common names in English include wax apple, Java apple, Semarang rose-apple, and wax jambu.

== Description ==
Syzygium samarangense is a tropical tree growing to 12 metres (39 feet) tall, with evergreen leaves 10–25 cm (4–10 in) long and 5–10 cm (2–4 in) broad. The leaves are elliptical, but rounded at the base; they are aromatic when crushed. The trunk is relatively short, with a wide – yet open – crown starting low on the tree. The bark is pinkish-gray in color, and flakes readily.

The flowers are white to yellowish-white, 2.5 cm (1 in) diameter, with four petals and numerous stamens. They form in panicles of between three and 30 near branch tips. The resulting fruit is a bell-shaped, edible berry, with colors ranging from white, pale green, or green to red, purple, or crimson, to deep purple or even black. The fruit grows 4–6 cm (1.6–2.4 in) long in wild plants, and has four fleshy calyx lobes at the tip. The skin is thin, and the flesh is white and spongy. Each berry holds one or two rounded seeds not larger than .8 cm (0.3 in). The flowers and resulting fruit are not limited to the axils of the leaves, and can appear on nearly any point on the surface of the trunk and branches. When mature, the tree is considered a heavy bearer, yielding up to 700 fruits in a crop.

When ripe, the fruit puff outwards, with a slight concavity in the middle of the underside of the "bell". Healthy wax apples have a light sheen to them. Despite its name, a ripe wax apple only resembles an apple on the outside in color. It does not taste like an apple, and it has neither the fragrance nor the density of an apple. Its flavor is similar to a snow pear, and the liquid-to-flesh ratio of the wax apple is comparable to a watermelon. Unlike either apple or watermelon, the wax apple's flesh has a very loose weave. The very middle holds a seed situated in a sort of cotton candy-like mesh. This mesh is edible, but flavorless. The color of its juice depends on the cultivar; it may be purple to entirely colorless.

== Uses ==
=== Culinary ===
Rose-apples, raw
Nutritional value per 100 g (3.5 oz)
- Energy: 105 kJ (25 kcal)
- Carbohydrates: 5.70 g
- Fat: 0.30 g
- Protein: 0.60 g
Vitamins and minerals
Vitamins	Quantity %DV^{†}
Thiamine (B1)	2% 0.020 mg
Riboflavin (B2)	2% 0.030 mg
Niacin (B3)	5% 0.800 mg
Vitamin C	25% 22.3 mg
Minerals	Quantity %DV^{†}
Calcium	2% 29 mg
Iron	0% 0.07 mg
Magnesium	1% 5 mg
Phosphorus	1% 8 mg
Potassium	4% 123 mg
Sodium	0% 0 mg
Zinc	1% 0.06 mg
- Other constituents: Quantity
- Cholesterol: 0 mg
- Link to Full Nutrient Report of USDA Database entry
- ^{†}Percentages estimated using US recommendations for adults, except for potassium, which is estimated based on expert recommendation from the National Academies.

Several cultivars with larger fruit have been selected. In general, the paler or darker the color, the sweeter it is.

In Southeast Asia, the black ones are nicknamed "Black Pearl" or "Black Diamond", while the very pale greenish-white ones, called "Pearl", are among the highest-priced ones in fruit markets. The fruit is often served uncut, but with the core removed, to preserve the unique bell-shaped presentation.

In the Indian Ocean islands cuisine, the fruit is frequently used in salads, as well as in lightly sautéed dishes. It is mainly eaten as a fruit and also used to make pickles called chambakka achar.

In the Philippines, its local name is macopa or makopa. Its precolonial name is dambo. Because of their similarity in appearance, it is often confused with tambis (Syzygium aqueum), although the latter is more commonly cultivated.

== Gallery ==
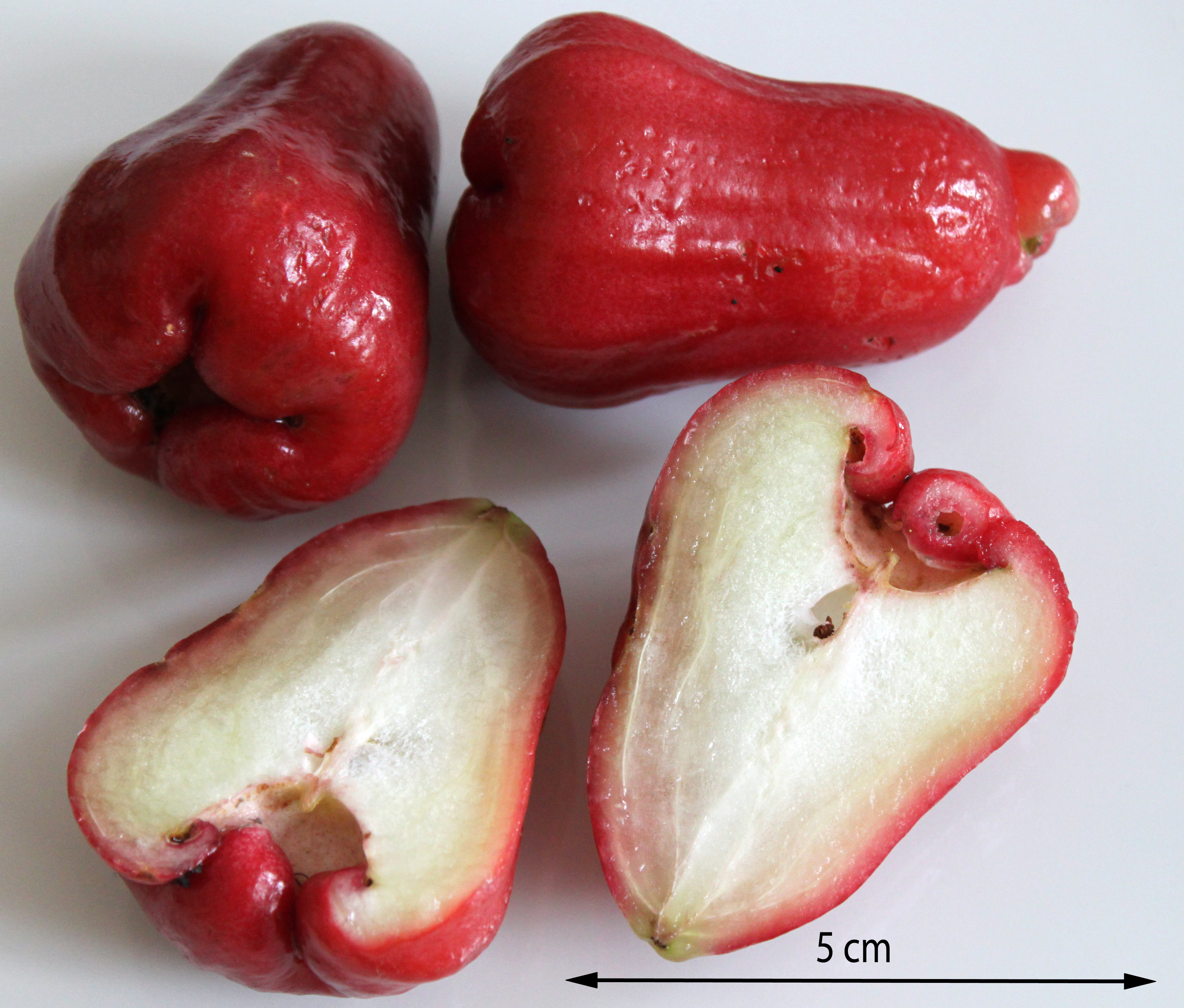
Fruit, whole and in longitudinal section

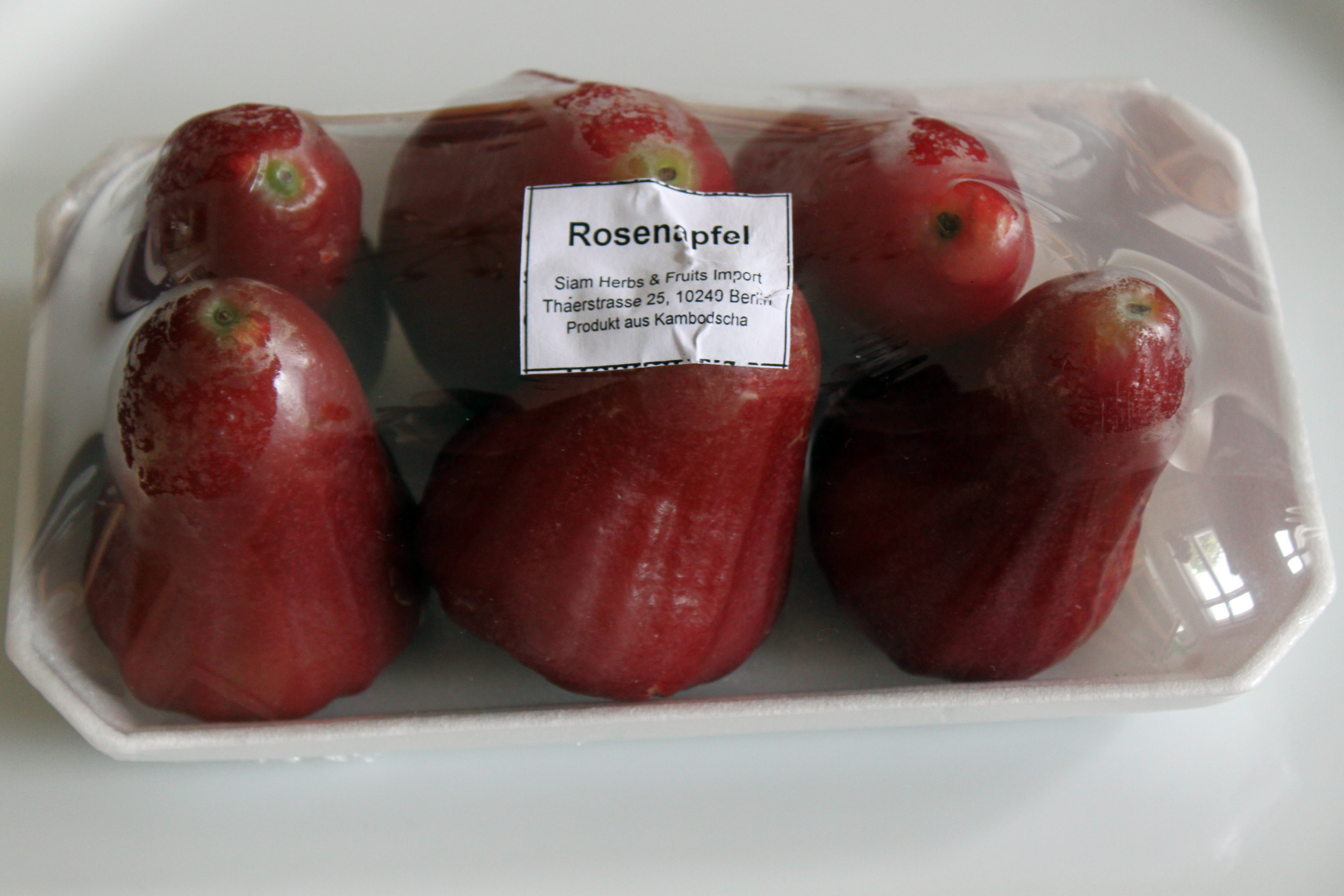
Fruit packed for sale

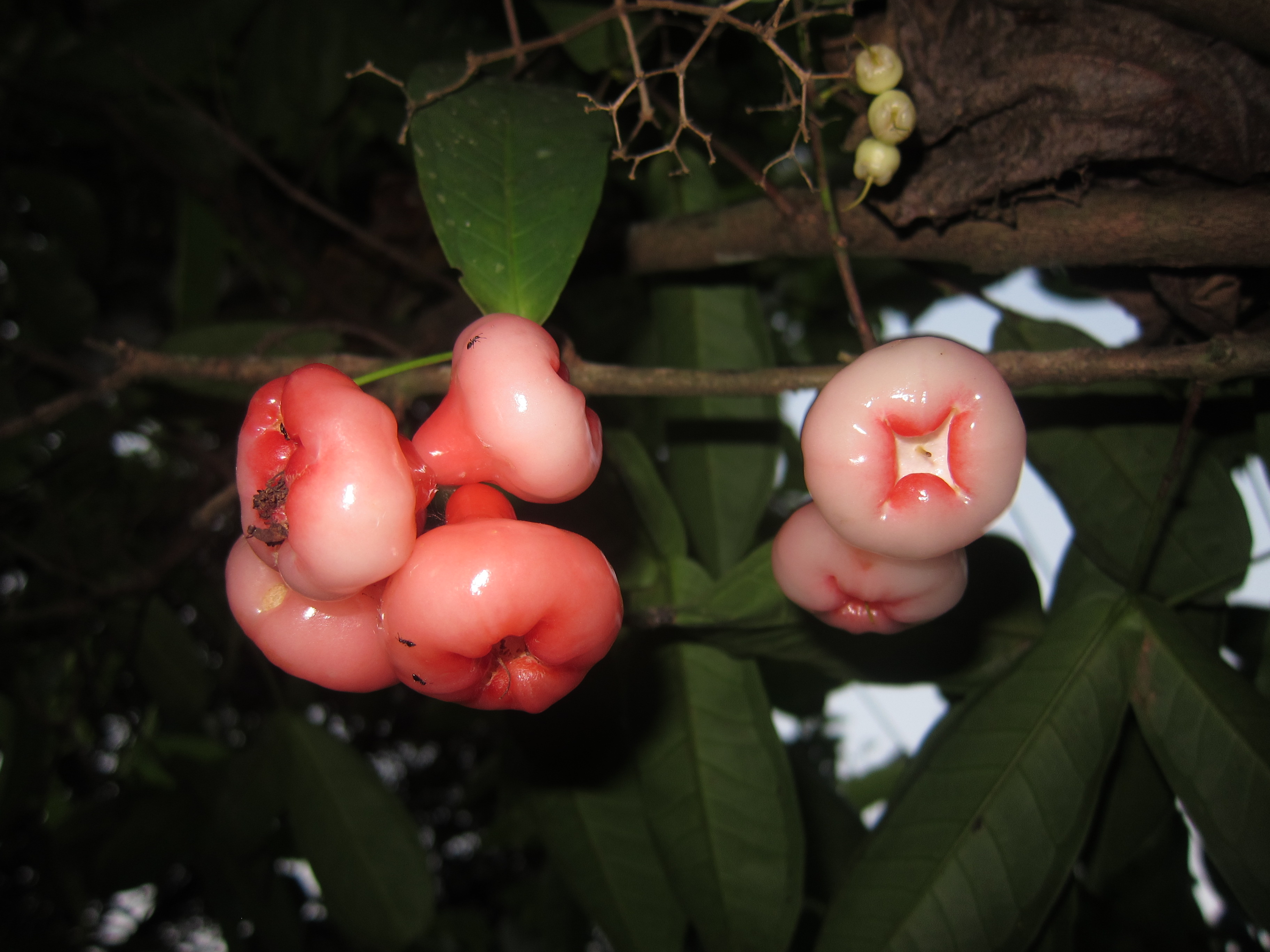
Fruit in the tree

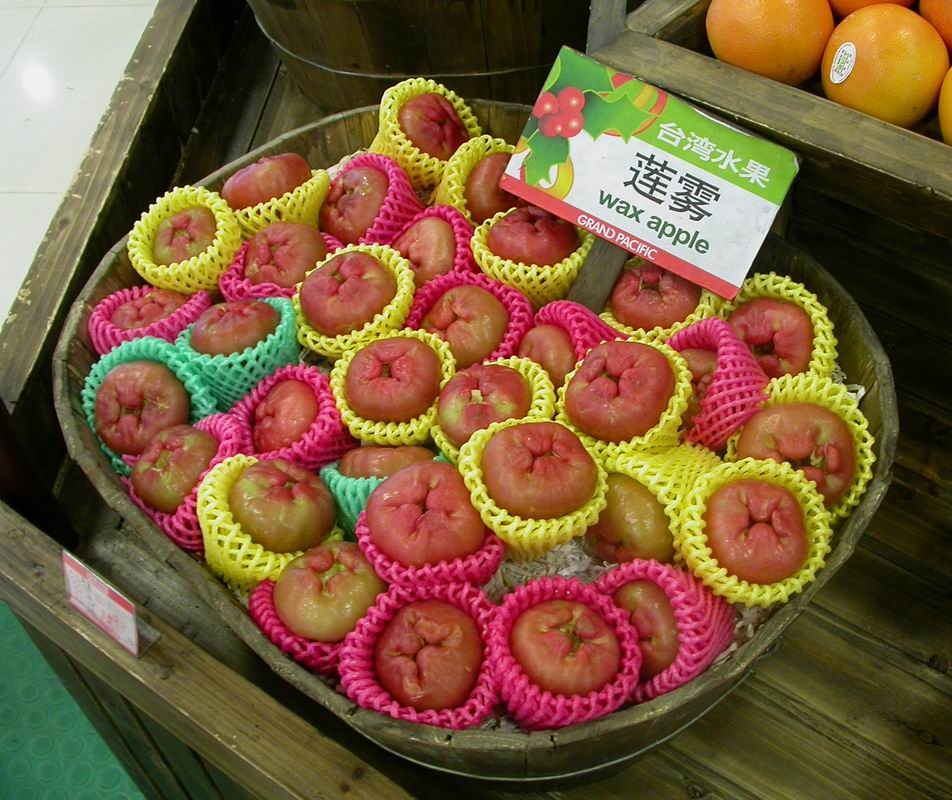
Fruit for sale

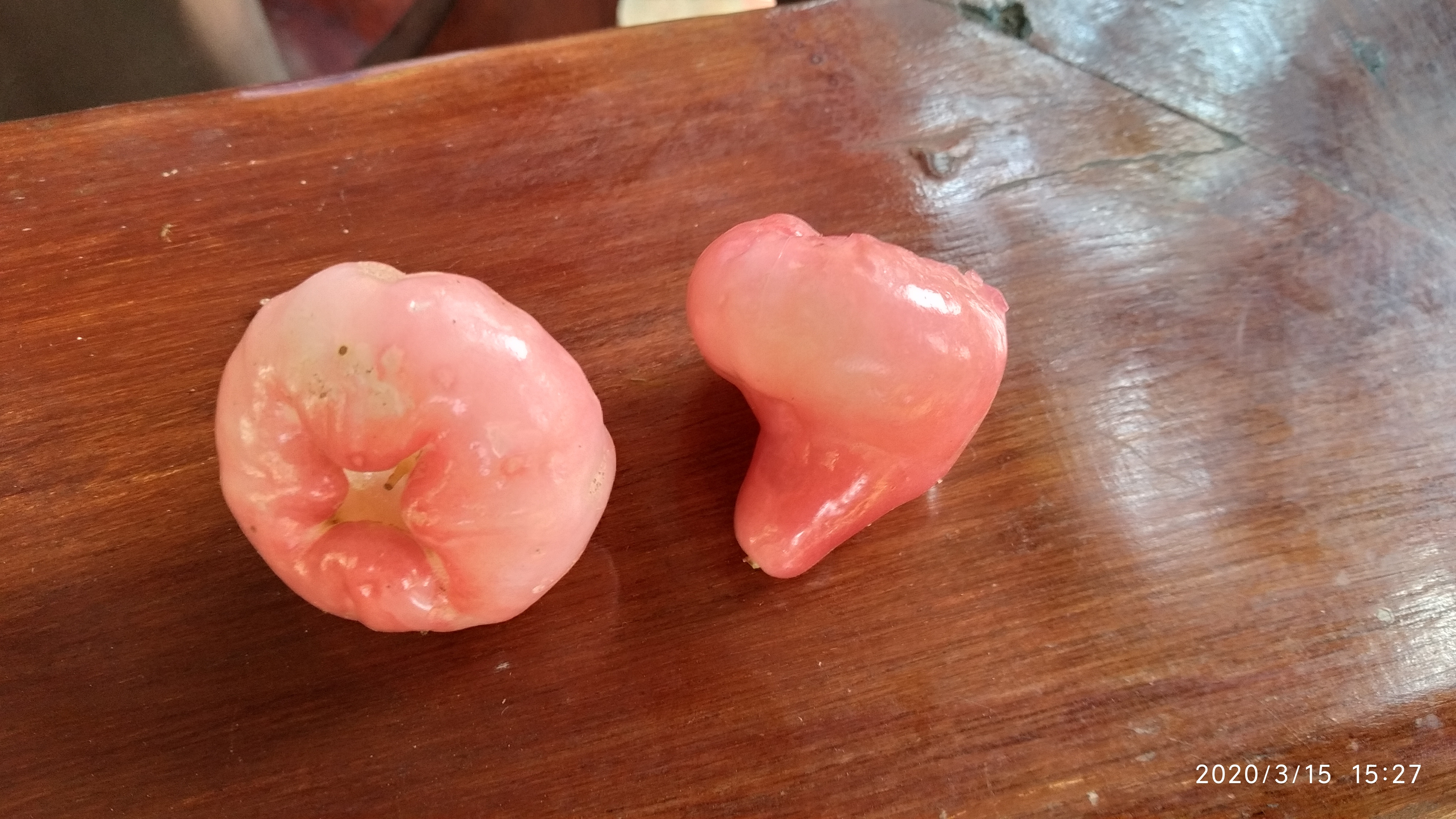
Fruit in Puducherry

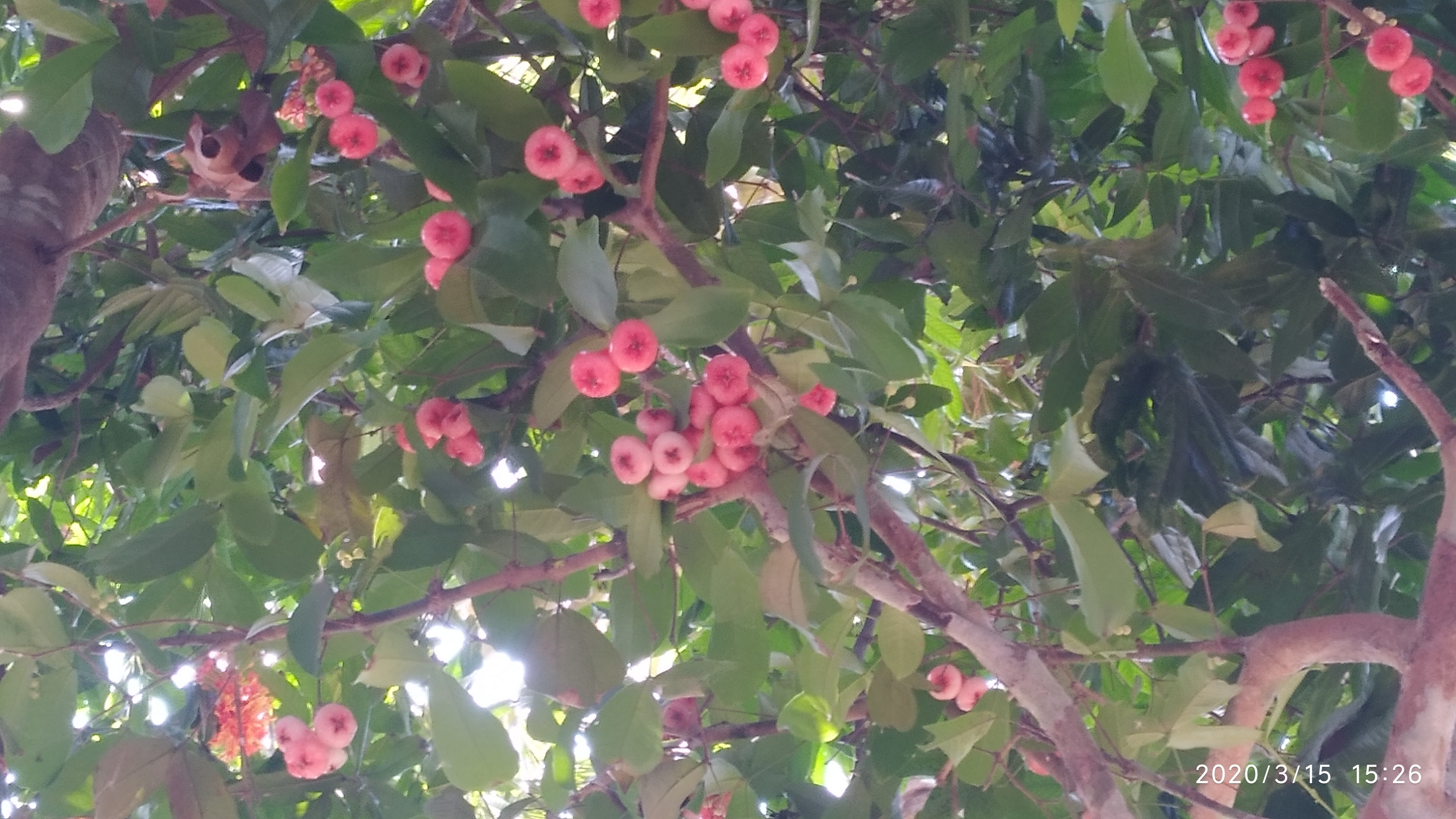
Tree in Puducherry

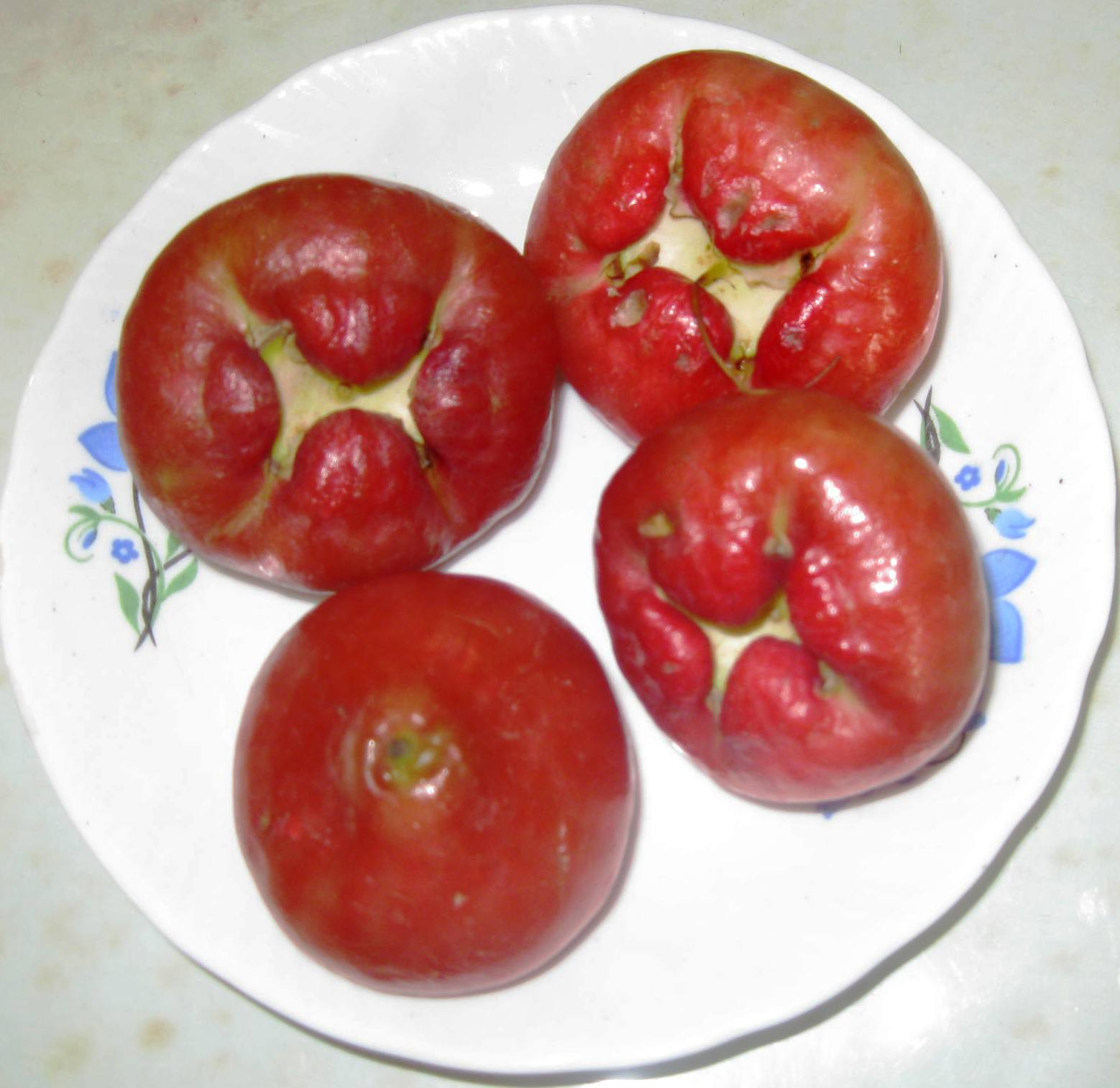
Red variety of fruit

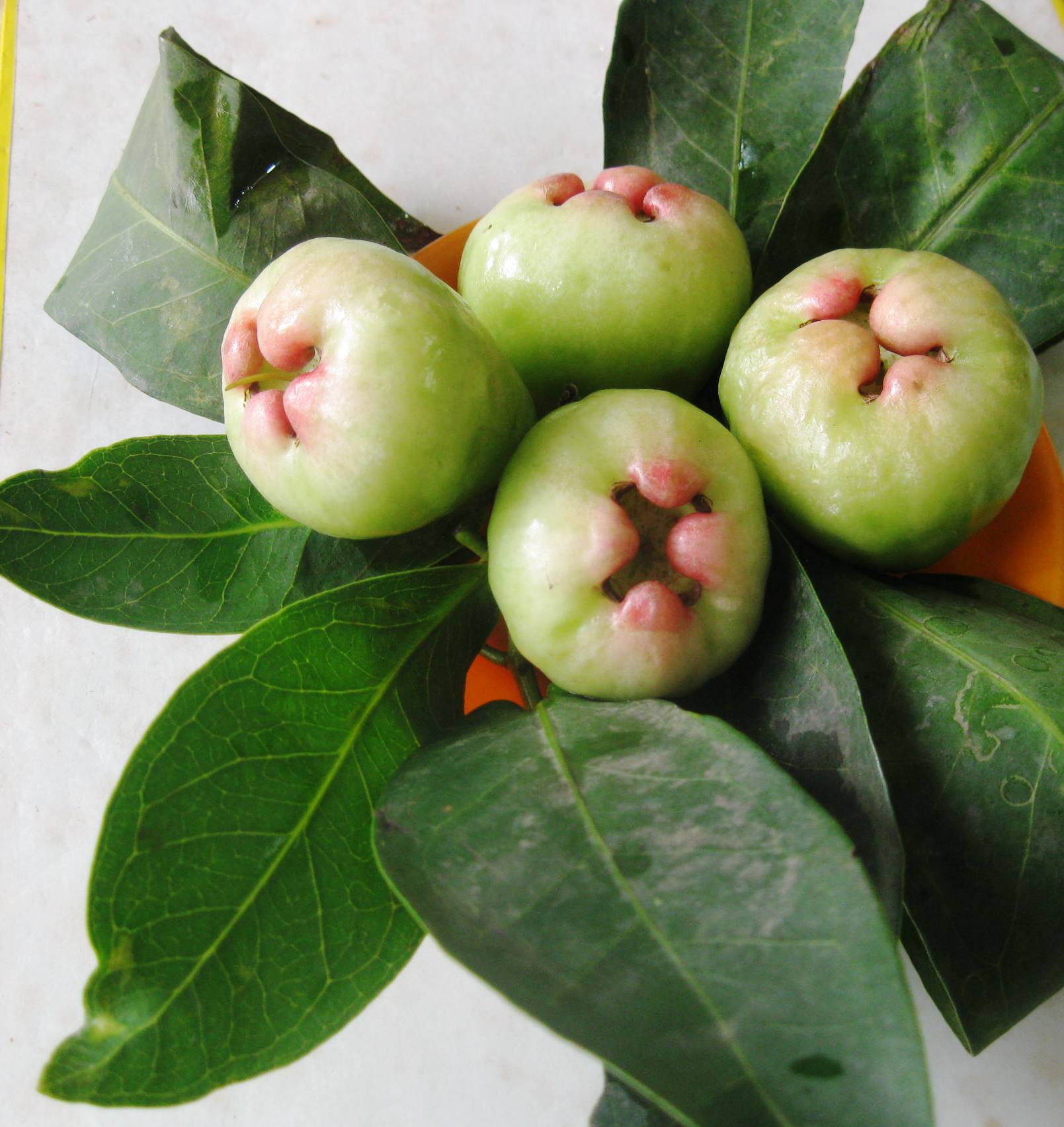
Fruit with leaves

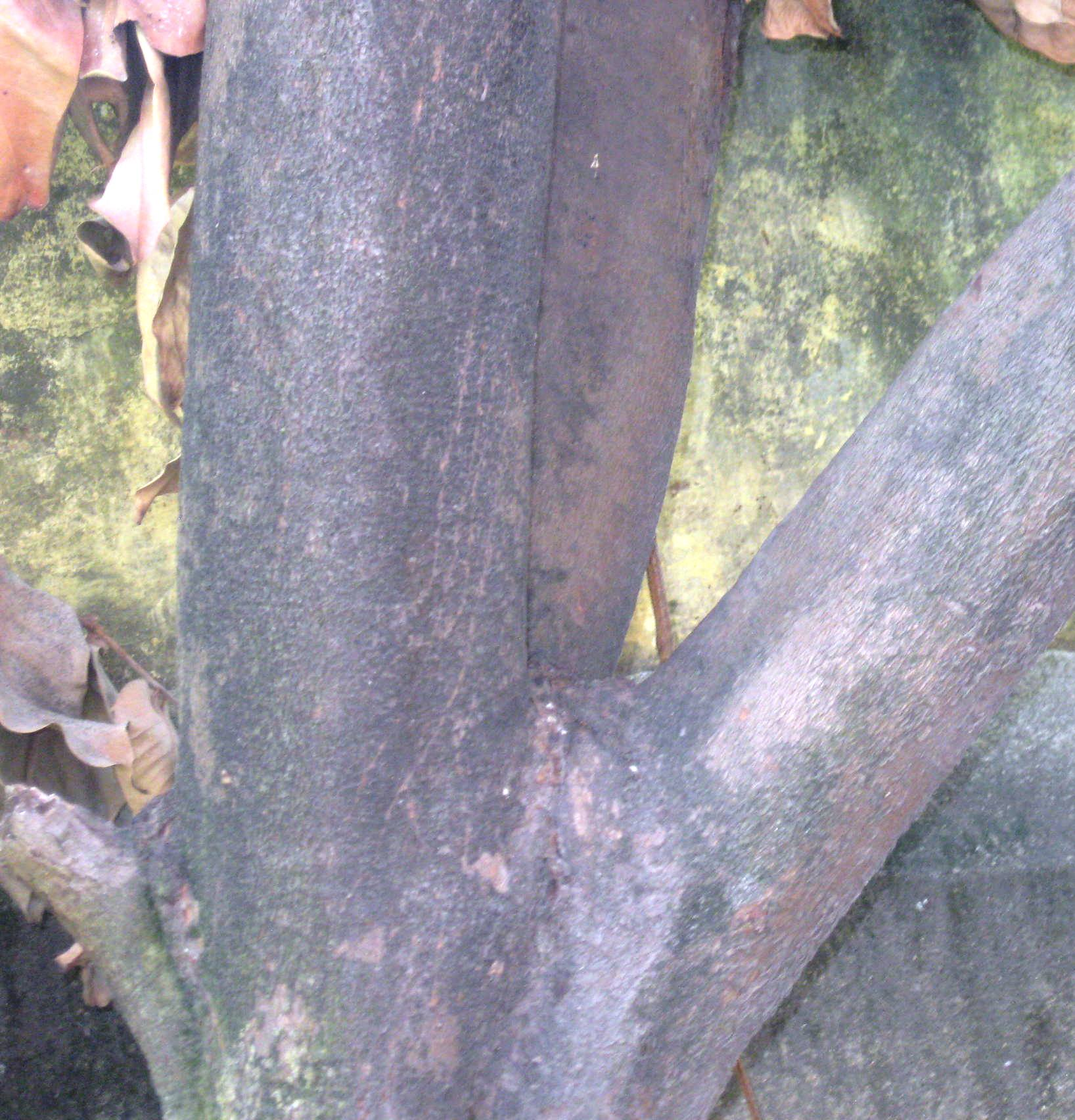
Lower trunk

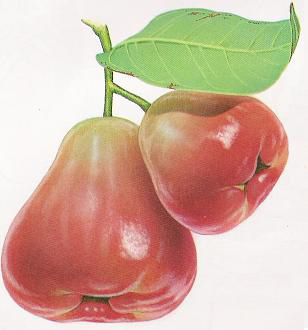
"Black Pearl" wax apple

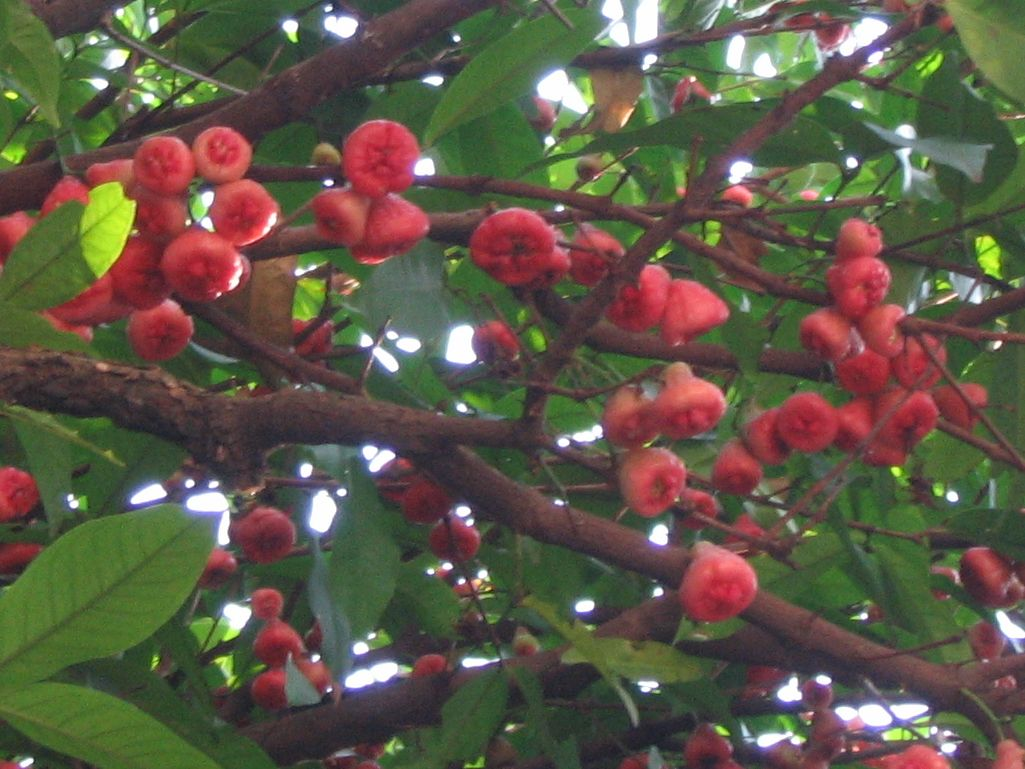

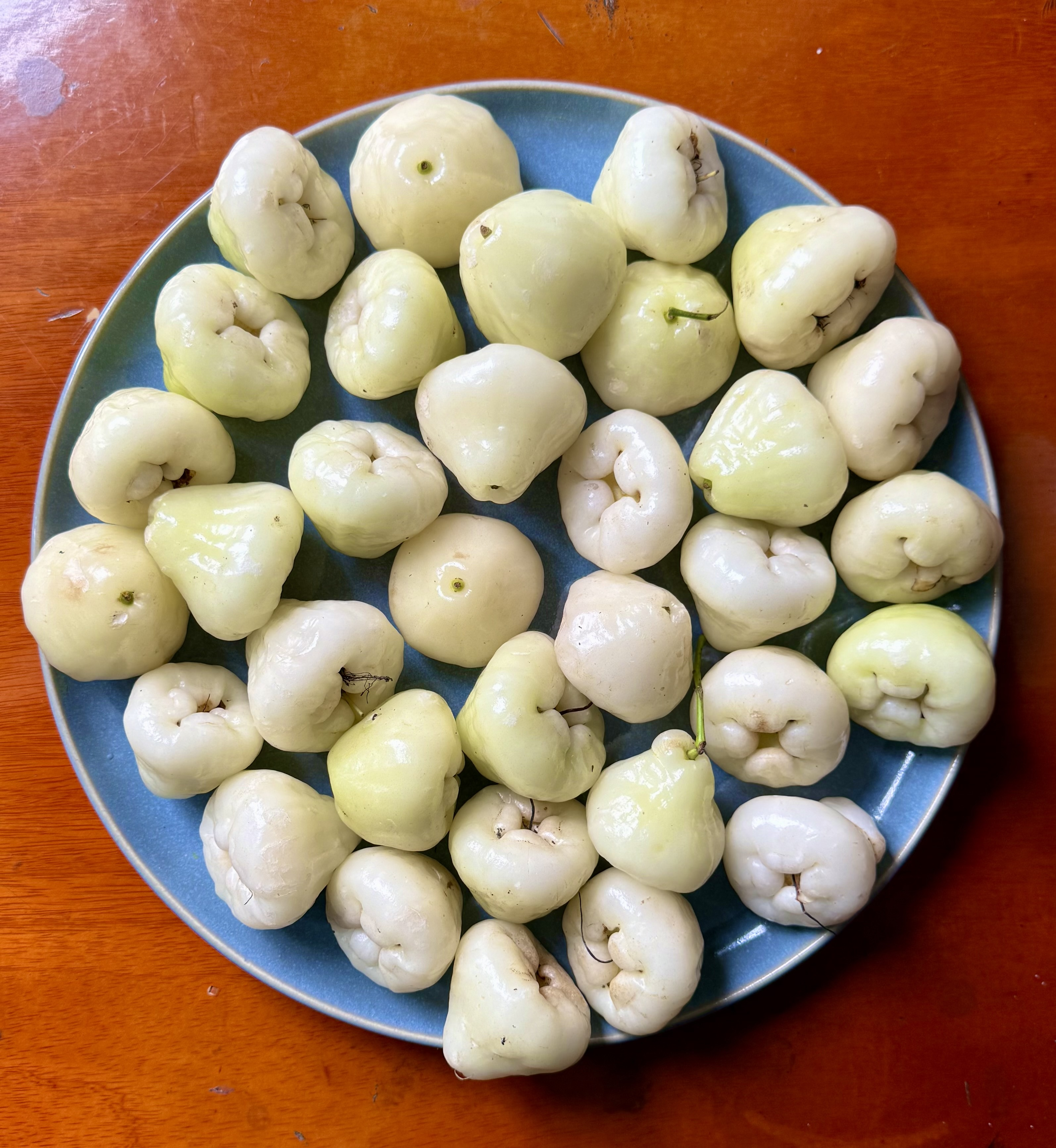
Pale greenish-white variety of fruit in Dhaka
