= List of common trees and shrubs of Sri Lanka =

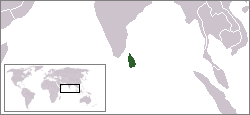
Location of Sri Lanka

The common trees and shrubs of Sri Lanka are a part of the diverse plant wildlife of Sri Lanka.

The following list provides the 704 species of common trees and shrubs of flora of Sri Lanka under 95 families. The list is according to A Field Guide to the Common Trees and Shrubs of Sri Lanka, by Mark Ashton, Savitri Gunatilleke, Neela de Zoysa, M.D. Dassanayake, Nimal Gunatilleke and Siril Wijesundera.

Native species are denoted as (N), Introduced species as (I)

== Division: Pteridophyta ==
=== Family: Cyatheaceae - Scaly tree ferns ===
- Cyathea crinita - N
- Cyathea gigantea - N
- Cyathea hookeri - Endemic
- Cyathea sinuata - N
- Cyathea walkerae - N

== Division: Cycadophyta ==
=== Family: Cycadaceae - Queen Sago ===
- Cycas circinalis - N

== Division: Pinophyta ==
=== Family: Araucariaceae - Araucarians ===
- Agathis robusta - I
- Araucaria bidwillii - I
- Araucaria cookii - I
- Araucaria cunninghamii - I

=== Family: Cupressaceae - Cypresses ===
- Cupressus macrocarpa - I
- Cupressus torulosa - I

=== Family: Pinaceae - Pines ===
- Pinus caribaea - I
- Pinus patula - I

== Division: Anthophyta ==
=== Subdivision: Monocotyledons ===
==== Family: Asparagaceae ====
- Dracaena fragrans - I
- Dracaena reflexa - I

==== Family: Poaceae‡ - Grasses ====
- Bambusa bambos - N
- Bambusa multiplex - I
- Bambusa polymorpha - N
- Bambusa vulgaris - I
- Davidsea attenuata - Endemic
- Dendrocalamus giganteus - I
- Dendrocalamus asper - I
- Dendrocalamus hamiltonii - I
- Dendrocalamus longispathus - I
- Dendrocalamus strictus - I
- Melocanna baccifera - I
- Neololeba atra - I
- Ochlandra stridula - Endemic
- Pseudoxytenanthera monadelpha - N

==== Family: Musaceae - Bananas ====
- Musa balbisiana - N

==== Family: Strelitziaceae - Traveller's palm ====
- Ravenala madagascariensis - I

==== Family: Arecaceae - Palm trees ====
- Areca catechu - I
- Borassus flabellifer - I
- Caryota urens - N
- Cocos nucifera - I
- Corypha umbraculifera - N
- Loxococcus rupicola - Endemic
- Oncosperma fasciculatum - Endemic
- Phoenix pusilla - N
- Roystonea regia - I

==== Family: Pandanaceae - Screw palms ====
- Pandanus amaryllifolius - I
- Pandanus ceylanicus - Endemic
- Pandanus kaida - N
- Pandanus odoratissimus - N
- Pandanus tectorius - I
- Pandanus thwaitesii - N

== Division: Anthophyta ==
=== Subdivision: Magnoliids ===
==== Family: Acanthaceae - Acanthus ====
- Acanthus ilicifolius - N
- Avicennia marina - N
- Avicennia officinalis - N
- Barleria mysorensis - N
- Barleria prionitis - N
- Ecbolium viride - N
- Justicia adhatoda - N
- Pseuderanthemum carruthersii - N
- Pseuderanthemum maculatum - I
- Rhinacanthus nasutus - N
- Stenosiphonium cordifolium - N
- Strobilanthes anceps - Endemic
- Strobilanthes asperrima - Endemic
- Strobilanthes calycina - Endemic
- Strobilanthes helicoides - Endemic
- Strobilanthes hookeri - Endemic
- Strobilanthes sexennis - Endemic
- Strobilanthes trifida - Endemic
- Strobilanthes vestita - Endemic
- Strobilanthes viscosa - Endemic
- Strobilanthes walkeri - Endemic

==== Family: Annonaceae - Custard apples ====
- Alphonsea hortensis - Endemic
- Alphonsea sclerocarpa - N
- Alphonsea zeylanica - Endemic
- Annona cherimola - I
- Annona glabra - I
- Annona muricata - I
- Annona reticulata - I
- Annona squamosa - I
- Cananga odorata - I
- Cyathocalyx zeylanicus - N
- Desmos zeylanicus - N
- Goniothalamus gardneri - Endemic
- Goniothalamus hookeri - Endemic
- Goniothalamus thwaitesii - N
- Miliusa indica - N
- Polyalthia cerasoides - N
- Polyalthia coffeoides - N
- Polyalthia korinti - N
- Polyalthia longifolia - N
- Xylopia championii - Endemic
- Xylopia nigricans - Endemic

==== Family: Magnoliaceae - Magnolias ====
- Magnolia champaca - I
- Magnolia nilagirica - N

==== Family: Monimiaceae ====
- Hortonia angustifolia - Endemic
- Hortonia floribunda - Endemic

==== Family: Myristicaceae - Nutmegs ====
- Horsfieldia irya - N
- Horsfieldia iryaghedhi - Endemic
- Myristica dactyloides - Endemic
- Myristica fragrans - I

== Division: Anthophyta ==
=== Subdivision: Dicotyledons ===
==== Family: Anacardiaceae - Cashews ====
- Anacardium occidentale - I
- Campnosperma zeylanicum - Endemic
- Lannea coromandelica - N
- Mangifera indica - I
- Mangifera zeylanica - Endemic
- Nothopegia beddomei - N
- Semecarpus coriacea - Endemic
- Semecarpus gardneri - Endemic
- Semecarpus nigro-viridis - Endemic
- Semecarpus subpeltata - Endemic
- Semecarpus walkeri - Endemic
- Spondias dulcis - I

==== Family: Anisophylleaceae ====
- Anisophyllea cinnamomoides - Endemic

==== Family: Apocynaceae - Dogbanes ====
- Allamanda cathartica - I
- Alstonia macrophylla - I
- Alstonia scholaris - N
- Calotropis gigantea - N
- Carissa carandas - N
- Carissa grandiflora - I
- Carissa spinarum - N
- Cerbera odollam - N
- Nerium oleander - I
- Plumeria obtusa - I
- Plumeria rubra - I
- Rauvolfia serpentina - N
- Rauvolfia verticillata - N (Syn. Rauvolfia densiflora)
- Tabernaemontana amygdalifolia - N (Syn. Pagiantha dichotoma)
- Tabernaemontana divaricata - I
- Thevetia peruviana - I
- Wrightia angustifolia - Endemic
- Wrightia antidysenterica - Endemic (Syn. Walidda antidysenterica)
- Wrightia flavorosea - Probably extinct

==== Family: Aquifoliaceae - Hollys ====
- Ilex walkeri - N

==== Family: Araliaceae ====
- Heptapleurum racemosum - N
- Heptapleurum stellatum - N

==== Family: Aristolochiaceae - Birthworts ====
- Thottea siliquosa - N

==== Family: Asteraceae - Composites ====
- Tithonia diversifolia - I
- Vernonia arborea - N

==== Family: Bignoniaceae - Bignonias ====
- Crescentia cujete - I
- Dolichandrone spathacea - N
- Jacaranda mimosifolia - I
- Oroxylum indicum - N
- Spathodea campanulata - I
- Stereospermum colais - N
- Tabebuia rosea - I
- Tabebuia serratifolia - I
- Tecoma stans - I

==== Family: Bixaceae - Achiotes ====
- Bixa orellana - N
- Cochlospermum religiosum - I

==== Family: Boraginaceae - Forget-me-nots ====
- Carmona retusa - N
- Cordia curassavica - I
- Cordia dichotoma - N
- Cordia monoica - N
- Cordia sinensis - N
- Cordia subcordata - N
- Ehretia laevis - N
- Tournefortia argentea - N

==== Family: Boraginaceae ====
- Canarium zeylanicum - Endemic
- Commiphora caudata - N

==== Family: Buxaceae ====
- Sarcococca zeylanica - Endemic

==== Family: Calophyllaceae - Chestnuts ====
- Calophyllum bracteatum - Endemic
- Calophyllum calaba - Endemic
- Calophyllum inophyllum - N
- Calophyllum thwaitesii - Endemic
- Calophyllum walkeri - Endemic
- Mesua ferrea - Endemic
- Mesua thwaitesii - Endemic

==== Family: Cannabaceae ====
- Celtis cinnamomea - N
- Celtis philippensis - N
- Gironniera parvifolia - Endemic
- Trema orientalis - N

==== Family: Capparaceae - Capers ====
- Capparis zeylanica - N
- Crateva religiosa - N

==== Family: Caricaceae - Papayas ====
- Carica papaya - I

==== Family: Casuarinaceae - Sheoaks ====
- Casuarina equisetifolia - I

==== Family: Celastraceae - Bittersweets ====
- Glyptopetalum zeylanicum - N
- Kokoona zeylanica - Endemic
- Microtropis wallichiana - N
- Microtropis zeylanica - Endemic

==== Family: Centroplacaceae ====
- Bhesa ceylanica - Endemic
- Cassine glauca - Endemic
- Euonymus walkeri - Endemic
- Pleurostylia opposite - N

==== Family: Chloranthaceae ====
- Sarcandra glabra - N

==== Family: Clusiaceae ====
- Clusia rosea - I
- Garcinia echinocarpa - N
- Garcinia hermonii - Endemic
- Garcinia mangostana - I
- Garcinia morella - N
- Garcinia quaesita - Endemic
- Garcinia spicata - N
- Garcinia terpnophylla - Endemic

==== Family: Combretaceae - white mangroves ====
- Anogeissus latifolia - N
- Lumnitzera racemosa - N
- Terminalia arjuna - N
- Terminalia bellirica - N
- Terminalia catappa - I
- Terminalia chebula - N

==== Family: Connaraceae ====
- Connarus monocarpus - N

==== Family: Cornaceae ====
- Mastixia arborea - N
- Mastixia tetrandra - Endemic

==== Family: Crypteroniaceae ====
- Axinandra zeylanica - Endemic

==== Family: Daphniphyllaceae ====
- Daphniphyllum neilgherrense - N

==== Family: Dichapetalaceae ====
- Dichapetalum gelonioides - N

==== Family: Dilleniaceae ====
- Dillenia indica - N
- Dillenia retusa - Endemic
- Dillenia suffruticosa - I
- Dillenia triquetra - Endemic
- Schumacheria alnifolia - Endemic
- Schumacheria castaneifolia - Endemic

==== Family: Dipterocarpaceae - Dipterocarps ====
- Dipterocarpus hispidus - Endemic
- Dipterocarpus zeylanicus - Endemic
- Hopea jucunda - Endemic
- Shorea affinis - Endemic
- Shorea congestiflora - Endemic
- Shorea cordifolia - Endemic
- Shorea disticha - Endemic
- Shorea dyeri - Endemic
- Shorea gardneri - Endemic
- Shorea megistophylla - Endemic
- Shorea oblongifolia - Endemic
- Shorea stipularis - Endemic
- Shorea trapezifolia - Endemic
- Shorea worthingtonii - Endemic
- Shorea zeylanica - Endemic
- Stemonoporus acuminatus - Endemic
- Stemonoporus canaliculatus - Endemic
- Stemonoporus gardneri - Endemic
- Vateria copallifera - Endemic
- Vatica obscura - Endemic

==== Family: Ebenaceae - Ebonys ====
- Diospyros acuminata - Endemic
- Diospyros ebenum - N
- Diospyros ferrea - N
- Diospyros hirsuta - Endemic
- Diospyros insignis - N
- Diospyros malabarica - N
- Diospyros melanoxylon - N
- Diospyros montana - N
- Diospyros oocarpa - N
- Diospyros ovalifolia - N
- Diospyros racemosa - N
- Diospyros thwaitesii - Endemic
- Diospyros walkeri - Endemic

==== Family: Elaeocarpaceae ====
- Elaeocarpus amoenus - Endemic
- Elaeocarpus ceylanicus - Endemic
- Elaeocarpus glandulifer - Endemic
- Elaeocarpus hedyosmus - Endemic
- Elaeocarpus montanus - Endemic
- Elaeocarpus serratus - N
- Elaeocarpus subvillosus - N
- Elaeocarpus taprobanicus - Endemic

==== Family: Ericaceae - Heathers ====
- Gaultheria leschenaultii - N
- Rhododendron arboreum - N

==== Family: Erythroxylaceae ====
- Erythroxylum monogynum - N
- Erythroxylum zeylanicum - Endemic

==== Family: Euphorbiaceae - Spurges ====
- Acalypha hispida - I
- Acalypha wilkesiana - I
- Agrostistachys borneensis - Endemic
- Agrostistachys hookeri - Endemic
- Aleurites moluccanus - I
- Blachia umbellata - N
- Chaetocarpus castanocarpus - N
- Chaetocarpus coriaceus - Endemic
- Chaetocarpus ferrugineus - Endemic
- Codiaeum variegatum - I
- Croton aromaticus - I
- Croton tiglium - N
- Dimorphocalyx glabellus - Endemic
- Euphorbia antiquorum - N
- Euphorbia pulcherrima - I
- Euphorbia tirucalli - I
- Excoecaria agallocha - N
- Excoecaria oppositifolia - N
- Hevea brasiliensis - I
- Homonoia riparia - N
- Jatropha curcas - I
- Macaranga indica - N
- Macaranga peltata - N
- Mallotus distans - N
- Mallotus eriocarpus - Endemic
- Mallotus fuscescens - Endemic
- Mallotus philippensis - N
- Mallotus resinosus - N
- Mallotus rhamnifolius - N
- Mallotus tetracoccus - N
- Mallotus thunbergianus - Endemic
- Manihot esculenta - I
- Manihot carthaginensis subsp. glaziovii - I
- Mischodon zeylanicus - N
- Paracroton pendulus - N
- Paracroton zeylanicus - N
- Podadenia sapida - Endemic
- Ricinus communis - I
- Suregada lanceolata - N

==== Family: Fabaceae - Legumes ====
- Abrus precatorius - N
- Acacia decurrens - I
- Acacia mangium - I
- Acacia melanoxylon - I
- Acacia planifrons - N
- Adenanthera pavonina - I
- Albizia lebbeck - I
- Albizia odoratissima - N
- Albizia saman - I
- Archidendron bigeminum - N
- Archidendron clypearia subsp. subcoriaceum - N
- Bauhinia tomentosa - N
- Butea monosperma - N
- Calliandra guildingii - I
- Caesalpinia pulcherrima - I
- Cassia fistula - N
- Cassia javanica - I
- Cassia roxburghii - N
- Crudia zeylanica - E
- Delonix regia - I
- Dendrolobium triangulare - N (syn. Desmodium umbellatum Moritz.)
- Dialium ovoideum - Endemic
- Dichrostachys cinerea - N
- Erythrina fusca - N
- Erythrina variegata - N
- Falcataria moluccana - I (syn. Albizia falcataria)
- Flemingia macrophylla - N
- Flemingia strobilifera - N
- Gliricidia sepium - I
- Humboldtia laurifolia - N
- Leucaena leucocephala - I
- Millettia pinnata - N
- Parkinsonia aculeata - I
- Peltophorum pterocarpum - N
- Pericopsis mooniana - N
- Phanera variegata - I
- Bauhinia racemosa - N (syn. Piliostigma racemosum)
- Pithecellobium dulce - I
- Pterocarpus indicus - I
- Pterocarpus marsupium - N
- Saraca asoca - N
- Senna auriculata - N
- Senna siamea - N
- Senna spectabilis - N
- Sesbania grandiflora - I
- Sophora tomentosa - I
- Tadehagi triquetrum - I
- Tamarindus indica - I
- Vachellia leucophloea - I

==== Family: Gentianaceae ====
- Fagraea ceilanica - N

==== Family: Goodeniaceae ====
- Scaevola taccada - N

==== Family: Hernandiaceae ====
- Gyrocarpus americanus - N

==== Family: Icacinaceae ====
- Apodytes dimidiata - N

==== Family: Lamiaceae - Sages ====
- Callicarpa tomentosa - N
- Volkameria inermis - N (syn. Clerodendrum inerme)
- Clerodendrum infortunatum - N
- Clerodendrum paniculatum - N
- Rotheca serrata - N (syn. Clerodendrum serratum)
- Gmelina arborea - I
- Tectona grandis - I
- Vitex altissima - N
- Vitex leucoxylon - N
- Vitex negundo - N
- Vitex trifolia - N

==== Family: Lauraceae - Laurels ====
- Actinodaphne albifrons - Endemic
- Actinodaphne molochina - Endemic
- Actinodaphne quinqueflora - N (syn. Litsea quinqueflora)
- Actinodaphne speciosa - Endemic
- Actinodaphne stenophylla - Endemic
- Alseodaphne semecarpifolia - N
- Beilschmiedia zeylanica - Endemic
- Cinnamomum dubium - Endemic
- Cinnamomum ovalifolium - Endemic
- Cinnamomum verum - N
- Cryptocarya wightiana - N
- Litsea gardneri - Endemic
- Litsea glaberrima - Endemic
- Litsea glutinosa - N
- Litsea iteodaphne - Endemic
- Litsea longifolia - Endemic
- Litsea ovalifolia - Endemic
- Neolitsea cassia - Endemic
- Neolitsea fuscata - Endemic
- Persea americana - I
- Persea macrantha - N

==== Family: Lecythidaceae ====
- Barringtonia acutangula - N
- Barringtonia asiatica - N
- Barringtonia racemosa - N
- Careya arborea - N
- Couroupita guianensis - I

==== Family: Loganiaceae ====
- Strychnos nux-vomica - N

==== Family: Lythraceae ====
- Lagerstroemia speciosa - N
- Punica granatum - I
- Sonneratia caseolaris - I

==== Family: Malvaceae - Mallows ====
- Adansonia digitata - I
- Berrya cordifolia - N
- Bombax ceiba - N
- Ceiba pentandra - I
- Diplodiscus verrucosus - Endemic
- Durio ceylanicus - Endemic (syn. Cullenia ceylanica)
- Durio rosayroanus - Endemic (syn. Cullenia rosayroana)
- Durio zibethinus - I
- Sterculia colorata - N (syn. Firmiana colorata)
- Grewia damine - N
- Grewia orientalis - N
- Grewia rothii - N
- Helicteres isora - N
- Heritiera littoralis - N
- Hibiscus platanifolius - N (syn. Hibiscus eriocarpus)
- Hibiscus rosa-sinensis - I
- Hibiscus tiliaceus - N
- Microcos paniculata - N
- Pterospermum suberifolium - N
- Sterculia balanghas - N
- Sterculia foetida - N
- Thespesia populnea - I
- Theobroma cacao - I

==== Family: Melastomataceae ====
- Lijndenia capitellata - Endemic
- Melastoma malabathricum - N
- Memecylon angustifolium - N
- Memecylon parvifolium - Endemic
- Memecylon rostratum - Endemic
- Memecylon sphaerocarpum - Endemic
- Memecylon sylvaticum - Endemic
- Memecylon umbellatum - N
- Memecylon varians - Endemic
- Osbeckia aspera - N
- Osbeckia lanata - Endemic
- Osbeckia octandra - Possibly Endemic

==== Family: Meliaceae - Mahoganys ====
- Aglaia apiocarpa - N
- Aglaia elaeagnoidea - N
- Aphanamixis polystachya - N
- Azadirachta indica - N
- Chukrasia tabularis - N
- Cipadessa baccifera - N
- Dysoxylum gotadhora - N (syn. Dysoxylum ficiforme)
- Dysoxylum championii - N
- Melia azedarach - N
- Swietenia macrophylla - I
- Swietenia mahagoni - I
- Toona ciliata - I
- Toona sinensis - I
- Heynea trifolia - N (syn. Walsura trifoliolata)

==== Family: Moraceae - Figs ====
- Artocarpus altilis - I
- Artocarpus heterophyllus - I
- Artocarpus nobilis - Endemic
- Castilla elastica - I
- Ficus benghalensis - I
- Ficus benjamina - I
- Ficus elastica - I
- Ficus exasperata - N
- Ficus fergusonii - Endemic
- Ficus hispida - N
- Ficus microcarpa - N
- Ficus nervosa - N
- Ficus racemosa - N
- Ficus religiosa - I
- Ficus tinctoria - N
- Ficus tsjahela - N
- Ficus virens - N
- Morus alba - I
- Streblus asper - N

==== Family: Moringaceae - Drumsticks ====
- Moringa oleifera - I

==== Family: Muntingiaceae ====
- Muntingia calabura - I

==== Family: Myrtaceae - Myrtles ====
- Eucalyptus camaldulensis - I
- Eucalyptus globulus - I
- Eucalyptus grandis - I
- Eucalyptus microcorys - I
- Eucalyptus pilularis - I
- Eucalyptus robusta - I
- Eugenia mabaeoides - Endemic
- Eugenia mooniana - N (syn. Eugenia thwaitesii)
- Eugenia roxburghii - N (syn. Eugenia bracteata)
- Psidium guajava - I
- Psidium guineense - I
- Psidium littorale - I
- Rhodomyrtus tomentosa - N
- Syzygium aqueum - N
- Syzygium aromaticum - I
- Syzygium assimile - N
- Syzygium caryophyllatum - N
- Syzygium cordifolium - Endemic
- Syzygium cumini - N
- Syzygium gardneri - N
- Syzygium jambos - I
- Syzygium makul - Endemic
- Syzygium malaccensis - I
- Syzygium micranthum - Endemic
- Syzygium neesianum - Endemic
- Syzygium oliganthum - Endemic
- Syzygium operculatum - Endemic
- Syzygium revolutum - N
- Syzygium rotundifolium - Endemic
- Syzygium rubicundum - N
- Syzygium spathulatum - Endemic
- Syzygium umbrosum - Endemic
- Syzygium zeylanicum - N

==== Family: Nyctaginaceae - Four o'clocks ====
- Bougainvillea spectabilis - I
- Pisonia grandis - I

==== Family: Ochnaceae ====
- Gomphia serrata - N
- Ochna lanceolata - N

==== Family: Olacaceae ====
- Olax zeylanica - Endemic
- Strombosia nana - Endemic

==== Family: Oleaceae - Olives ====
- Chionanthus albidiflorus - Endemic
- Chionanthus zeylanicus - N
- Jasminum angustifloium - N
- Jasminum auriculatum - N
- Jasminum rottlerianum - N
- Ligustrum robustum - N
- Nyctanthes arbor-tritis - I
- Olea polygama - N

==== Family: Pentaphylacaceae ====
- Adinandra lasiopetala - Endemic
- Eurya acuminata - N
- Eurya nitida - N
- Ternstroemia gymnanthera - N

==== Family: Phyllanthaceae ====
- Actephila excelsa - Endemic
- Antidesma alexiteria - N
- Antidesma jayasuriyae - Endemic
- Antidesma pyrifolium - Endemic
- Antidesma puncticulatum - N
- Aporosa cardiosperma - Endemic
- Aporosa fusiformis - Endemic
- Aporosa lanceolata - Endemic
- Aporosa latifolia - Endemic
- Breynia retusa - N
- Breynia vitis-idaea - N
- Bridelia moonii - Endemic
- Bridelia retusa - N
- Flueggea leucopyrus - N
- Glochidion gardneri - Endemic
- Glochidion moonii - Endemic
- Glochidion stellatum - Endemic
- Glochidion zeylanicum - N
- Phyllanthus acidus - I
- Phyllanthus emblica - N
- Phyllanthus indicus - N
- Phyllanthus myrtifolius - Endemic
- Phyllanthus polyphyllus - N
- Phyllanthus reticulatus - N
- Sauropus androgynus - N

==== Family: Pittosporaceae ====
- Pittosporum ceylanicum - Endemic
- Pittosporum ferrugineum - I
- Pittosporum tetraspermum - N

==== Family: Primulaceae - Primroses ====
- Ardisia gardneri - Endemic
- Ardisia paniculata - N
- Ardisia pauciflora - N
- Ardisia willisii - Endemic
- Maesa perrottetiana - N
- Myrsine robusta - N

==== Family: Proteaceae ====
- Grevillea robusta - I

==== Family: Putranjivaceae ====
- Drypetes sepiaria - N

==== Family: Rhamnaceae - Buckthorns ====
- Colubrina asiatica - N
- Rhamnus wightii - N
- Scutia myrtina - N
- Ziziphus jujuba - N
- Ziziphus oenoplia - N
- Ziziphus rugosa - N

==== Family: Rhizophoraceae - True mangroves ====
- Bruguiera cylindrica - N
- Bruguiera sexangula - N
- Carallia brachiata - N
- Ceriops tagal - N
- Rhizophora apiculata - N
- Rhizophora mucronata - N

==== Family: Rosaceae - Roses & Berries ====
- Benkara malabarica - N
- Canthium coromandelicum - N
- Canthium dicoccum - Endemic
- Canthium montanum - Endemic
- Canthium rheedei - N
- Catunaregum spinosa - Endemic
- Chassalia ambigua - N
- Coffea arabica - N
- Dichilanthe zeylanica - Endemic
- Gaertnera vaginans - Endemic
- Gaertnera walkeri - Endemic
- Guettarda speciosa - N
- Haldina cordifolia - I
- Hedyotis fruticosa - N
- Hedyotis lawsoniae - Endemic
- Hedyotis lessertiana - Endemic
- Ixora arborea - N
- Ixora calycina - Endemic
- Ixora coccinea - N
- Ixora jucunda - Endemic
- Ixora macrothyrsa - I
- Ixora thwaitesii - N
- Lasianthus oliganthus - Endemic
- Lasianthus strigosus - Endemic
- Lasianthus varians - Endemic
- Lasianthus walkerianus - Endemic
- Metabolos decipiens - Endemic
- Mitragyna parvifolia - N
- Morinda citrifolia - N
- Morinda tinctoria - N
- Mussaenda frondosa - N
- Nargedia macrocarpa - Endemic
- Nauclea orientalis - N
- Pavetta gleniei - Endemic
- Pavetta indica - N
- Photinia intergrifolia - N
- Prunus cerasoides - I
- Prunus ceylanica - N
- Prunus walkeri - Endemic
- Psychotria nigra - N
- Psychotria sordida - Endemic
- Psychotria zeylanica - N
- Pyrus communis - I
- Randia gardneri - Endemic
- Saprosma foetens - N
- Tarenna asiatica - N
- Timonius jambosella - Endemic
- Tricalysia dalzellii - Endemic
- Tricalysia erythrospora - Endemic
- Urophyllum ellipticum - Endemic
- Urophyllum zeylanicum - N
- Wendlandia bicuspidata - N

==== Family: Rutaceae - Citrus ====
- Acronychia pedunculata - N
- Aegle marmelos - N
- Atlanta ceylanica - N
- Atlanta monophylla - N
- Chloroxylon swietenia - N
- Citrus aurantiifolia - I
- Citrus grandis - I
- Citrus hystrix - I
- Citrus limon - I
- Citrus medica - I
- Citrus reticulata - I
- Clausena indica - N
- Euodia lunuankenda - I
- Glycosmis mauritiana - N
- Glycosmis pentaphylla - N
- Limonia acidissima - N
- Micromelum minutum - Endemic
- Murraya koenigii - N
- Murraya paniculata - N
- Pamburus missionis - N
- Pleiospermium alatum - N

==== Family: Sabiaceae ====
- Meliosma pinnata - N
- Meliosma simplicifolia - N

==== Family: Salicaceae - Willows ====
- Flacourtia indica - N
- Flacourtia inermis - I
- Homalium zeylanicum - N
- Hydnocarpus octandra - Endemic
- Hydnocarpus venenata - Endemic
- Scolopia acuminata - N
- Scolopia crassipes - Endemic
- Scolopia schreberi - Endemic

==== Family: Salvadoraceae - Toothbrushes ====
- Azima tetracantha - N
- Salvadora persica - N

==== Family: Santalaceae - Sandalwoods ====
- Santalum album - I

==== Family: Sapindaceae - Soapberries ====
- Allophylus cobbe - N
- Allophylus zeylanicus - Endemic
- Dimocarpus longan - N
- Filicium decipiens - N
- Glenniea unijuga - Endemic
- Harpullia arborea - N
- Lepisanthes senegalensis - N
- Lepisanthes tetraphylla - N
- Nephelium lappaceum - I
- Pometia pinnata - N
- Sapindus emarginatus - N
- Schleichera oleosa - N

==== Family: Sapotaceae ====
- Chrysophyllum cainito - N
- Isonandra alloneura - Endemic
- Isonandra compta - Endemic
- Isonandra lanceolata - N
- Isonandra zeylanica - Endemic
- Madhuca fulva - Endemic
- Madhuca longifolia - N
- Madhuca microphylla - Endemic
- Madhuca neriifolia - N
- Manilkara hexandra - N
- Mimusops elengi - N
- Palaquium canaliculatum - Endemic
- Palaquium grande - Endemic
- Palaquium laevifolium - Endemic
- Palaquium petiolare - Endemic
- Palaquium rubiginosum - Endemic
- Palaquium thawitesii - Endemic
- Pouteria campechiana - I
- Xantolis tomentosa - N

==== Family: Simaroubaceae ====
- Quassia indica - N

==== Family: Solanaceae - Nightshades ====
- Brugmansia suaveolens - I
- Brunfelsia americana - I
- Solanum erianthum - N
- Solanum giganteum - N
- Solanum tuberosum - I

==== Family: Staphyleaceae ====
- Turpinia malabarica - I

==== Family: Stemonuraceae ====
- Gomphandra coriacea - Endemic
- Gomphandra tetrandra - N
- Stemonurus apicalis - N

==== Family: Symplocaceae - Sweetleafs ====
- Symplocos cochinchinensis - N
- Symplocos cordifolia - Endemic
- Symplocos coronata - Endemic
- Symplocos cuneata - Endemic
- Symplocos elegans - Endemic
- Symplocos macrophylla - N
- Symplocos obtusa - N
- Symplocos pulchra - Endemic

==== Family: Tetramelaceae ====
- Tetrameles nudiflora - N

==== Family: Theaceae - Tea plants ====
- Camellia sinensis - I
- Gordonia ceylanica - Endemic
- Gordonia speciosa - Endemic

==== Family: Thymelaeaceae ====
- Gnidia glauca - N
- Gyrinops walla - N

==== Family: Ulmaceae ====
- Holoptelea integrifolia - N

==== Family: Urticaceae - Nettles ====
- Boehmeria nivea - I
- Boehmeria platyphylla - I
- Debregeasia longifolia - N
- Villebrunea intergrifolia - N

==== Family: Verbenaceae- Verbenas ====
- Duranta erecta - I
- Lantana camara - I
- Premna mollissima - N (syn. Premna latifolia)
- Premna serratifolia - N
- Premna thwaitesii - Endemic
- Premna tomentosa - N
- Premna wightiana - N

== Recommended New Plant species ==
The presence of following bamboo plants within Sri Lanka is still in doubt.

=== Family Poaceae ===
- Bambusa balcooa
- Bambusa blumeana
- Bambusa nutans
- Bambusa textilis
- Bambusa tuldoides
- Cephalostachya pergracile
- Dendrocalamus brandisii
- Dendrocalamus membranaceus
- Dendrocalamus sikkimensis
- Gigantochloa apus
- Gigantochloa levis
- Giagntochloa macrostachya
- Giagntochloa verticillata
- Guadua angustifolia
- Oxytenanthera abyssinica
- Oxytenanthera nigrociliata
- Phyllostachys bambusoides
- Schizostachyum lima
- Teinostachyum dullooa
- Thyrsostachys oliverii
