= Eugenia cyclophylla =

Eugenia cyclophylla is a taxon synonym for the several flowering plant taxa:

- Eugenia cyclophylla Baker, a synonym of Syzygium loiseleurioides (Baker) Govaerts
- Eugenia cyclophylla O.Berg, a synonym of Eugenia astringens Cambess.
- Eugenia cyclophylla Thwaites ex Duthie, a synonym of Syzygium revolutum subsp. cyclophyllum
