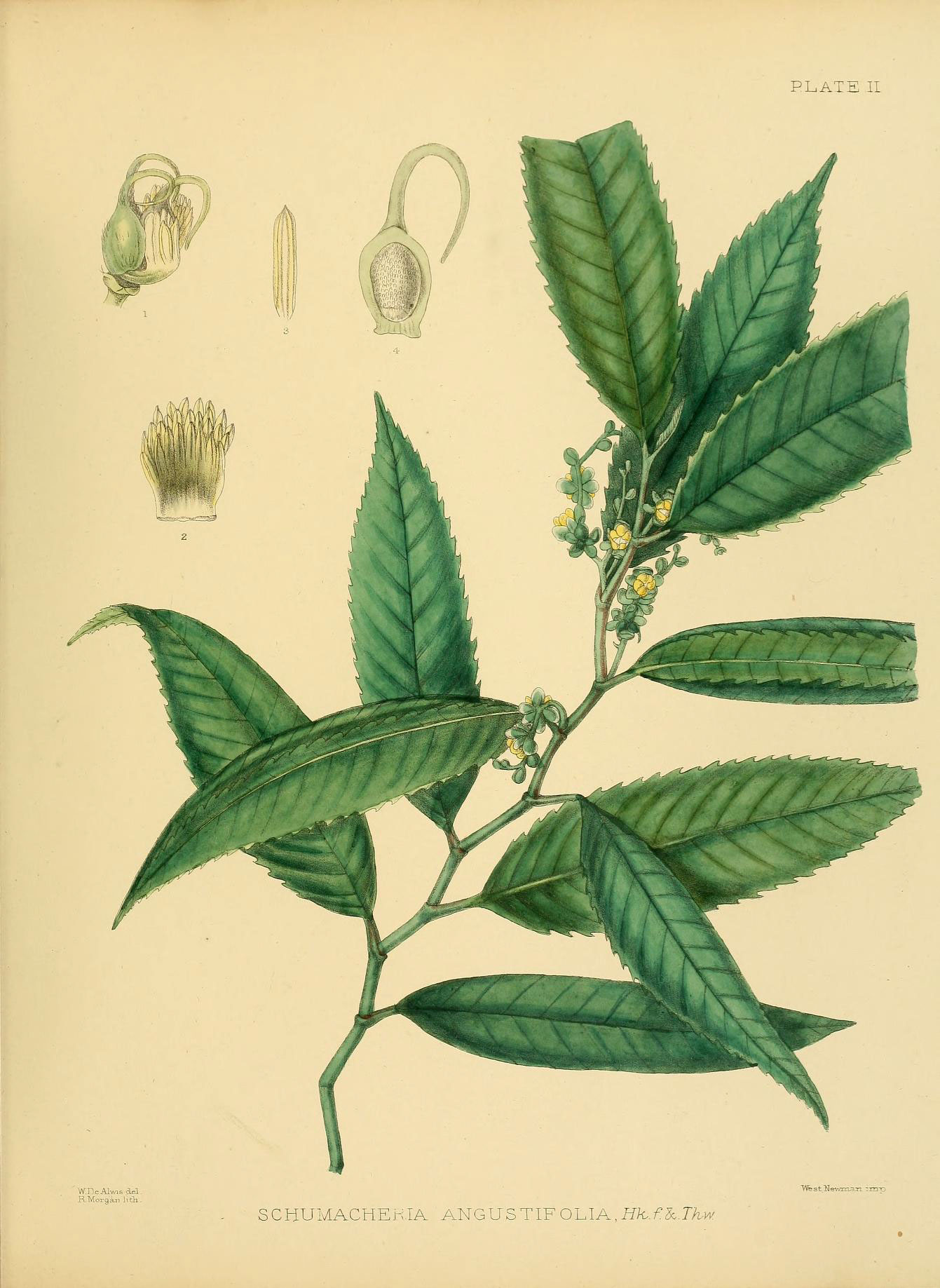
- Schumacheria angustifolia

Scientific classification
- Kingdom: Plantae
- Clade: Tracheophytes
- Clade: Angiosperms
- Clade: Eudicots
- Order: Dilleniales
- Family: Dilleniaceae
- Genus: Schumacheria; Vahl, 1810

= Schumacheria =

Genus of plants

Schumacheria is a small genus of plants in family Dilleniaceae. It contains 4 species.

== Species ==
- Schumacheria alnifolia Hook.f. & Thoms.
- Schumacheria angustifolia Hook.f. & Thomson
- Schumacheria castaneifolia Vahl
- Schumacheria raphanoides Spreng. ex D.Dietr.
