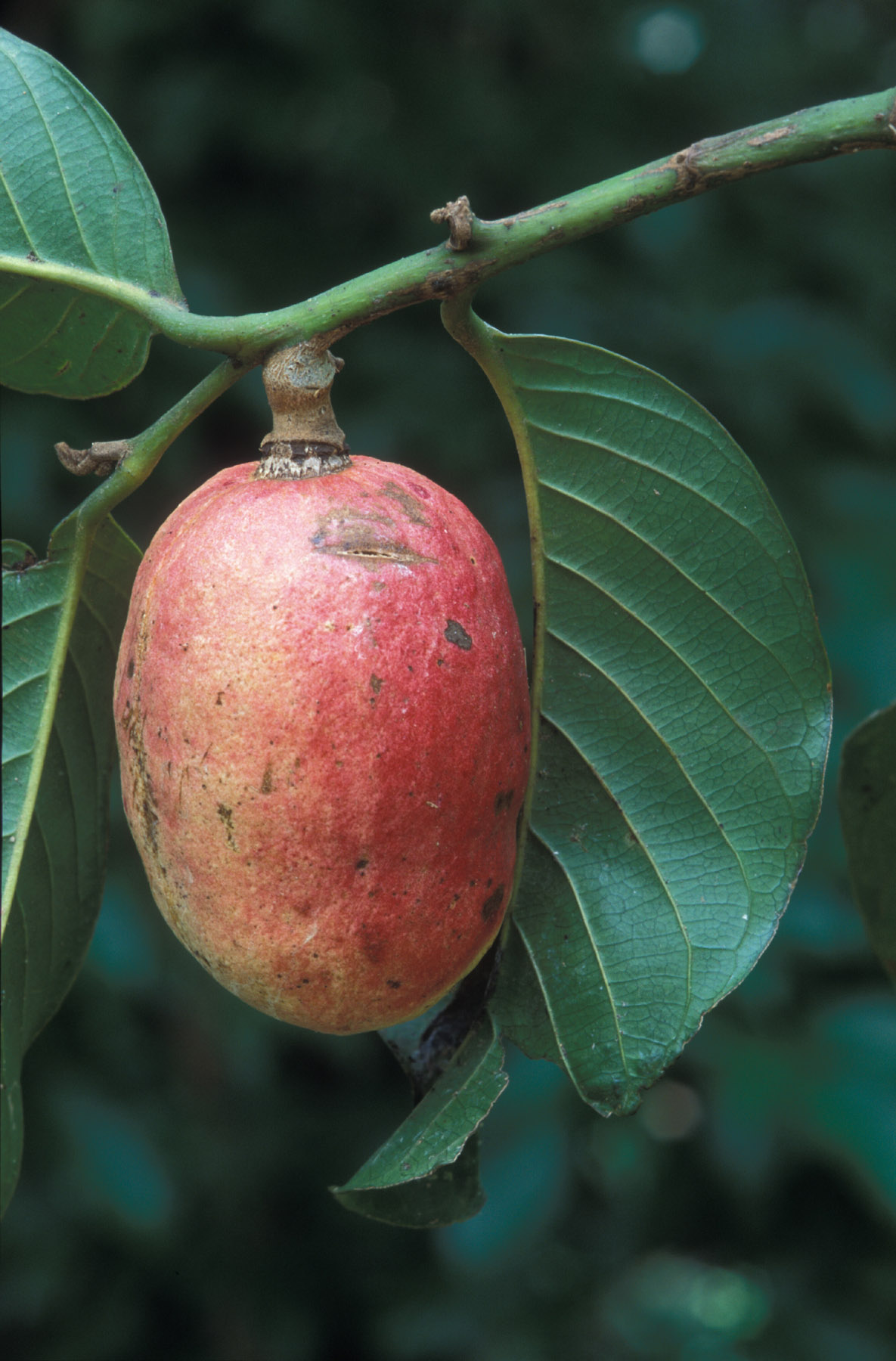
- Cyathocalyx sumatranus

Scientific classification
- Kingdom: Plantae
- Clade: Tracheophytes
- Clade: Angiosperms
- Clade: Magnoliids
- Order: Magnoliales
- Family: Annonaceae
- Subfamily: Ambavioideae
- Genus: Cyathocalyx; Champ. ex Hook. f. & Thomson

Species
- 7, see text

= Cyathocalyx =

Genus of flowering plants

Cyathocalyx is a small genus of 7 species distributed throughout the floristic regions of the Indian subcontinent, Indo-China and Malesia.

The name Cyathocalyx was erected as a genus in 1855 by Joseph Dalton Hooker and Thomas Thomson. Since then the delimitation of the genus has proved problematic, with various taxonomists proposing different assessments of the scope of the genus. In 2006 Rui Jiang Wang and Richard M.K. Saunders reduced the size of the genus from the then 36 species to 15. The genus was further reduced in 2010 to just seven species.

== Species ==
As of January 2025, Plants of the World Online accepts the following 7 species:

- Cyathocalyx annamensis Ast
- Cyathocalyx globosus Merr.
- Cyathocalyx harmandii (Finet & Gagnep.) R.J.Wang & R.M.K.Saunders
- Cyathocalyx magnifructus R.J.Wang & R.M.K.Saunders
- Cyathocalyx martabanicus Hook.f. & Thomson
- Cyathocalyx sumatranus Scheff.
- Cyathocalyx zeylanicus Champ. ex Hook.f. & Thomson
