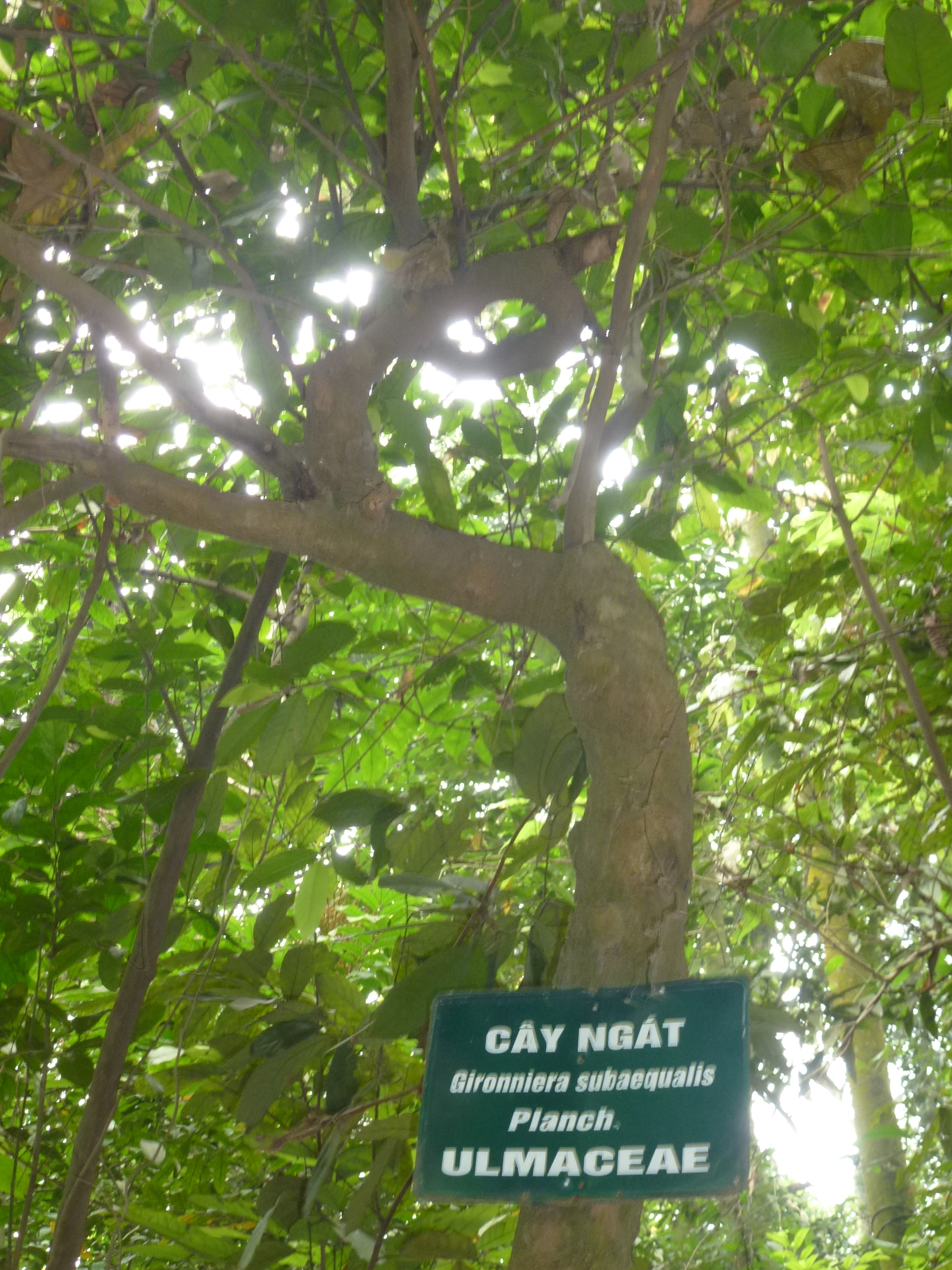
- Gironniera subaequalis at Hùng Temple, Vietnam

Scientific classification
- Kingdom: Plantae
- Clade: Embryophytes
- Clade: Tracheophytes
- Clade: Spermatophytes
- Clade: Angiosperms
- Clade: Eudicots
- Clade: Rosids
- Order: Rosales
- Family: Cannabaceae
- Genus: Gironniera; Gaudich. (1844)

Species
- 6, see text

Synonyms
- Dicera Zipp. ex Blume (1853), not validly publ.; Galumpita Blume (1856); Helminthospermum Thwaites (1854); Nematostigma Planch. (1848)

= Gironniera =

Genus of flowering plants

Gironniera, is a genus of deciduous trees in the family Cannabaceae. It contains six species native to Indochina, southern China, Malesia, and Papuasia.

== Species ==
Six species are accepted.

- Gironniera celtidifolia Gaudich.
- Gironniera hirta Ridl.
- Gironniera nervosa Planch.
- Gironniera parvifolia Planch.
- Gironniera rhamnifolia Blume
- Gironniera subaequalis Planch.

== Fossil record ==
†Gironniera carinata fossil seeds of the Chattian stage, Oligocene, are known from the Oberleichtersbach Formation in the Rhön Mountains, central Germany.
