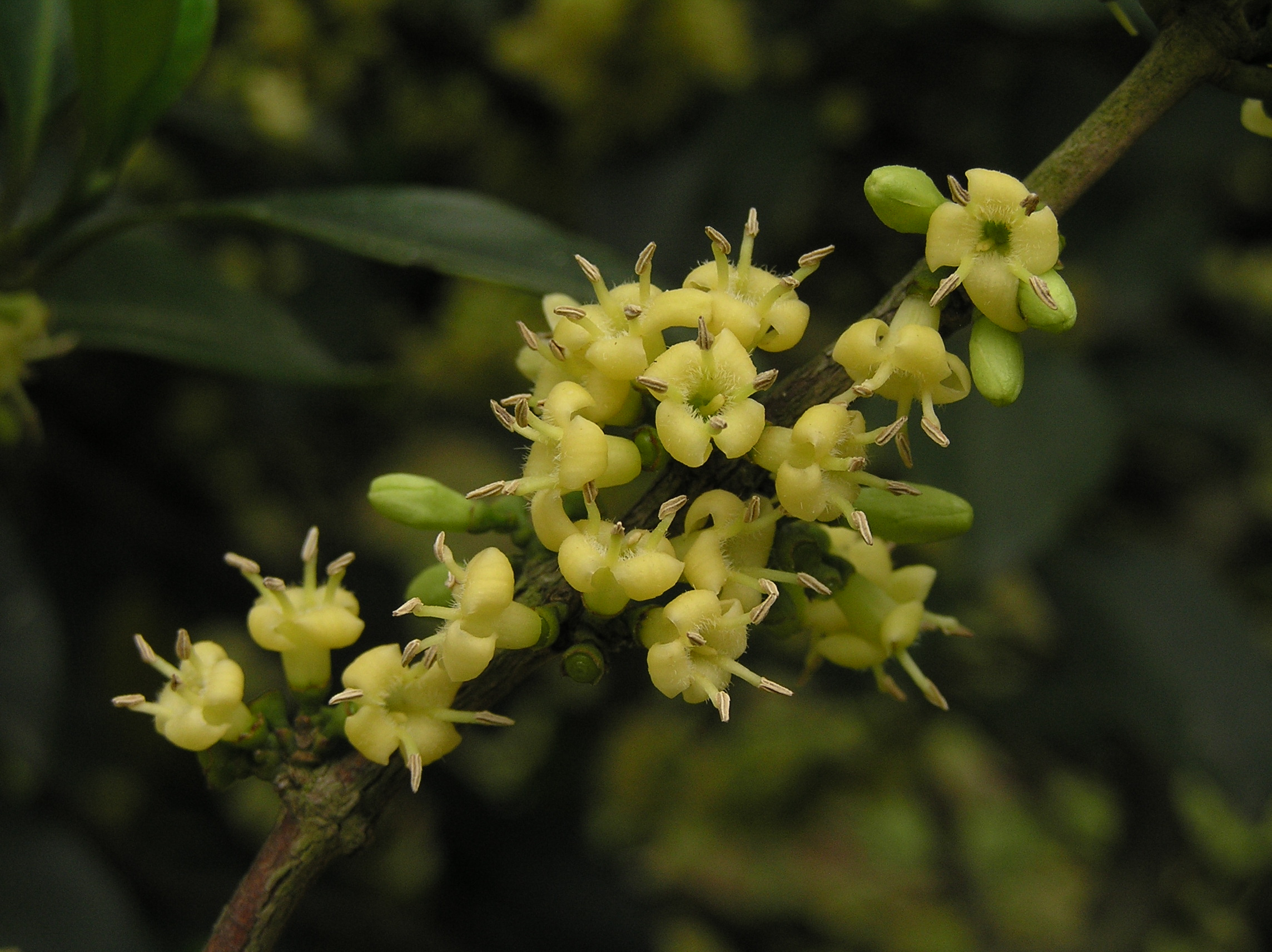
- Diplospora dubia

Scientific classification
- Kingdom: Plantae
- Clade: Tracheophytes
- Clade: Angiosperms
- Clade: Eudicots
- Clade: Asterids
- Order: Gentianales
- Family: Rubiaceae
- Subfamily: Ixoroideae
- Genus: Diplospora; DC.

Type species
- Diplospora viridiflora (syn. of Diplospora dubia) DC.

= Diplospora =

Genus of plants

Diplospora is a genus of flowering plants in the family Rubiaceae. The genus is found in tropical and subtropical Asia.

== Species ==
- Diplospora bilocularis (Kurz) M.Gangop. & Chakrab. - Burma
- Diplospora cuspidata Valeton - Sarawak
- Diplospora dubia (Lindl.) Masam. - China, Vietnam, Taiwan, Ryukyu Islands
- Diplospora erythrospora (Thwaites) Bedd. - Sri Lanka
- Diplospora fasciculiflora (Elmer) Elmer - Philippines
- Diplospora fruticosa Hemsl. - China, Vietnam
- Diplospora griffithii Hook.f. - Burma
- Diplospora kunstleri King & Gamble - Malaysia
- Diplospora lasiantha Ridl. - Malaysia
- Diplospora majumdarii M.Gangop. & Chakrab. - Perak
- Diplospora minahassae Koord. - northern Sulawesi
- Diplospora mollissima Hutch. - Yunnan
- Diplospora negrosensis (Elmer) Arriola & Alejandro
- Diplospora puberula (Merr.) S.J.Ali & Robbr. - Philippines
- Diplospora pubescens Hook.f. - Burma
- Diplospora schmidthii (K.Schum. Craib. - Thailand, Peninsular Malaysia
- Diplospora sessilis Elmer - Philippines
- Diplospora siamica Craib - Burma, Thailand
- Diplospora sorsogonensis (Elmer) A.P.Davis - Luzon
- Diplospora stylosa Ridl. - Thailand, Peninsular Malaysia
- Diplospora tinagoensis (Elmer) S.J.Ali & Robbr. - Borneo, Philippines
- Diplospora velutina King & Gamble - Perak
- Diplospora wrayi King & Gamble - Peninsular Malaysia
