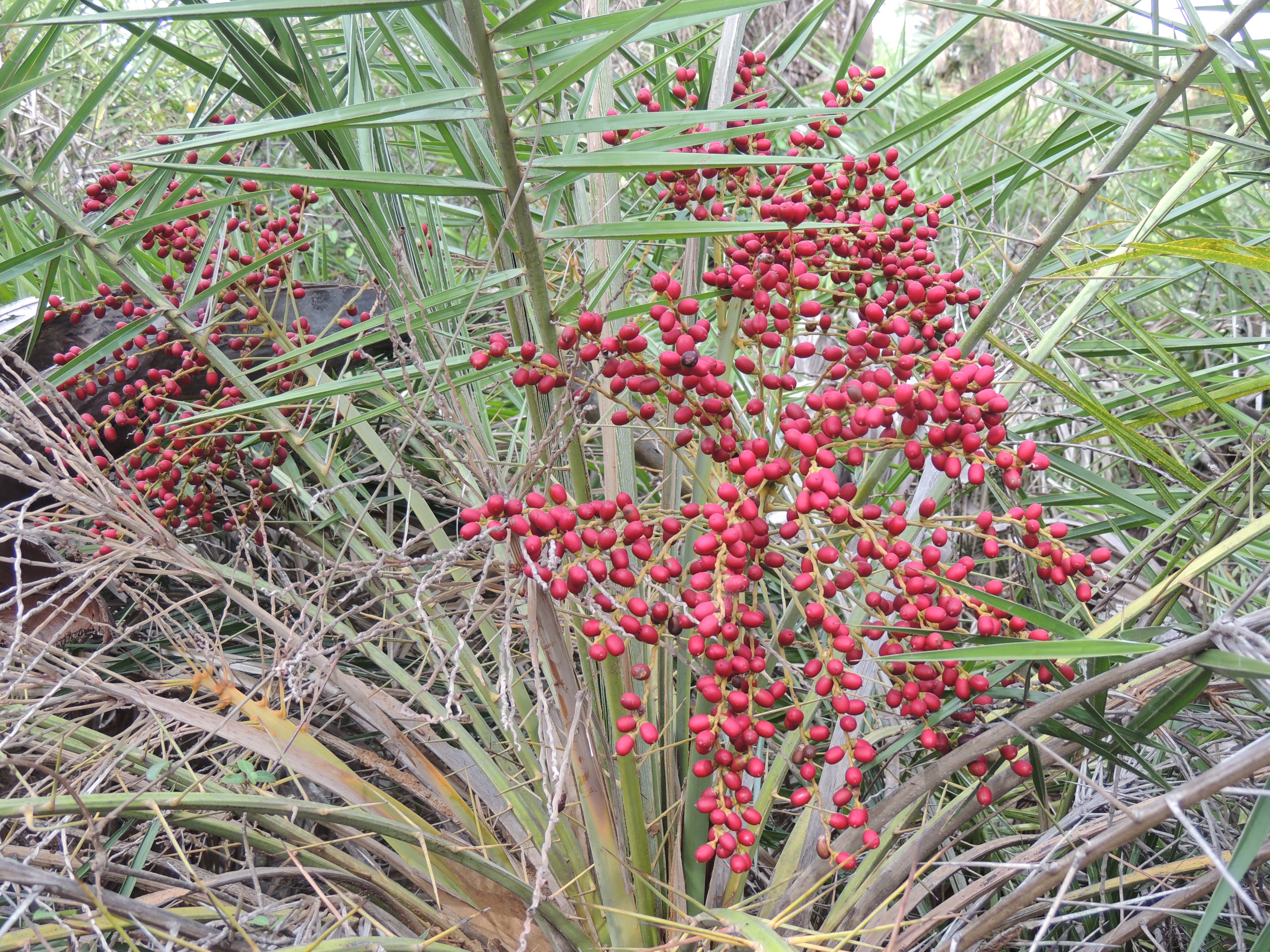

Scientific classification
- Kingdom: Plantae
- Clade: Tracheophytes
- Clade: Angiosperms
- Clade: Monocots
- Clade: Commelinids
- Order: Arecales
- Family: Arecaceae
- Genus: Phoenix
- Species: P. pusilla

Binomial name
- Phoenix pusilla Gaertner, 1788

Synonyms
- Phoenix farinifera Roxburgh; Phoenix zeylanica Trimen; Zelonops pusilla Gaertner

= Phoenix pusilla =

Species of palm

Phoenix pusilla is a species of flowering plant in the palm family, native to South India and Sri Lanka.

== Taxonomy and nomenclature ==
It is also commonly known as Ceylon date palm, flour palm, and small wild date palm. It was first described as Phoenix pusilla by Joseph Gaertner in De Fructibus et Seminibus Plantarum in 1788. The species name is derived from Latin "pusillus" meaning small or little. It is a flowering plant belonging to the Arecaceae (palm) family.

== Description ==
Fruits of Phoenix pusilla

Phoenix pusilla is a solitary plant which grows up to 6 m (20 ft) tall. Leaves are vertically oriented and clustered at the base and spread up to 30 cm (12 in) wide. There are 7 to 18 yellow-green leaves arranged on either side of the main axis. The leaves measure up to 3 m (9.8 ft) in length with long pseudo-petioles measuring up to 70 cm (28 in). There are 30 to 100 leaflets arranged on either side of the main axis of each leaf. Each leaflet measures 10 to 45 cm (3.9 to 17.7 in) in length, and are wider at the base and narrow as the tip.

The female inflorescence consists of a cluster of female flowers on a orange-green flower stalk measuring 25 to 75 cm (9.8 to 29.5 in) in length. The female flowers have a 1.2 mm (0.047 in) long calyx and petals measuring 2 cm (0.79 in) in length and 3 to 4 cm (1.2 to 1.6 in) in width. The male inflorescence consists of larger, yellow-white flowers held on a erect stalk measuring 5 to 25 cm (2.0 to 9.8 in) in length. The male flowers have a 1 to 1.5 mm (0.039 to 0.059 in) long calyx and petals measuring 4 to 5 cm (1.6 to 2.0 in) in length and 2 to 3 cm (0.79 to 1.18 in) in width. The female flower stalk bends when the fruits mature. The plant produces ovoid fruits measuring 11 to 15 mm (0.43 to 0.59 in) in length and 5 to 8 cm (2.0 to 3.1 in) in diameter. The fleshy fruits are initially green and turn to red and later to purple-black on ripening.

== Distribution and habitat ==
Phoenix pusilla is native to the states of Kerala and Tamil Nadu in South India, and Sri Lanka. It prefers well drained soils in warm tropical regions. Studies have indicated that the plant cooled the soil and decreased radiation by shielding the sun light in the summer and can be used as a nurse plant for protecting other plants.
