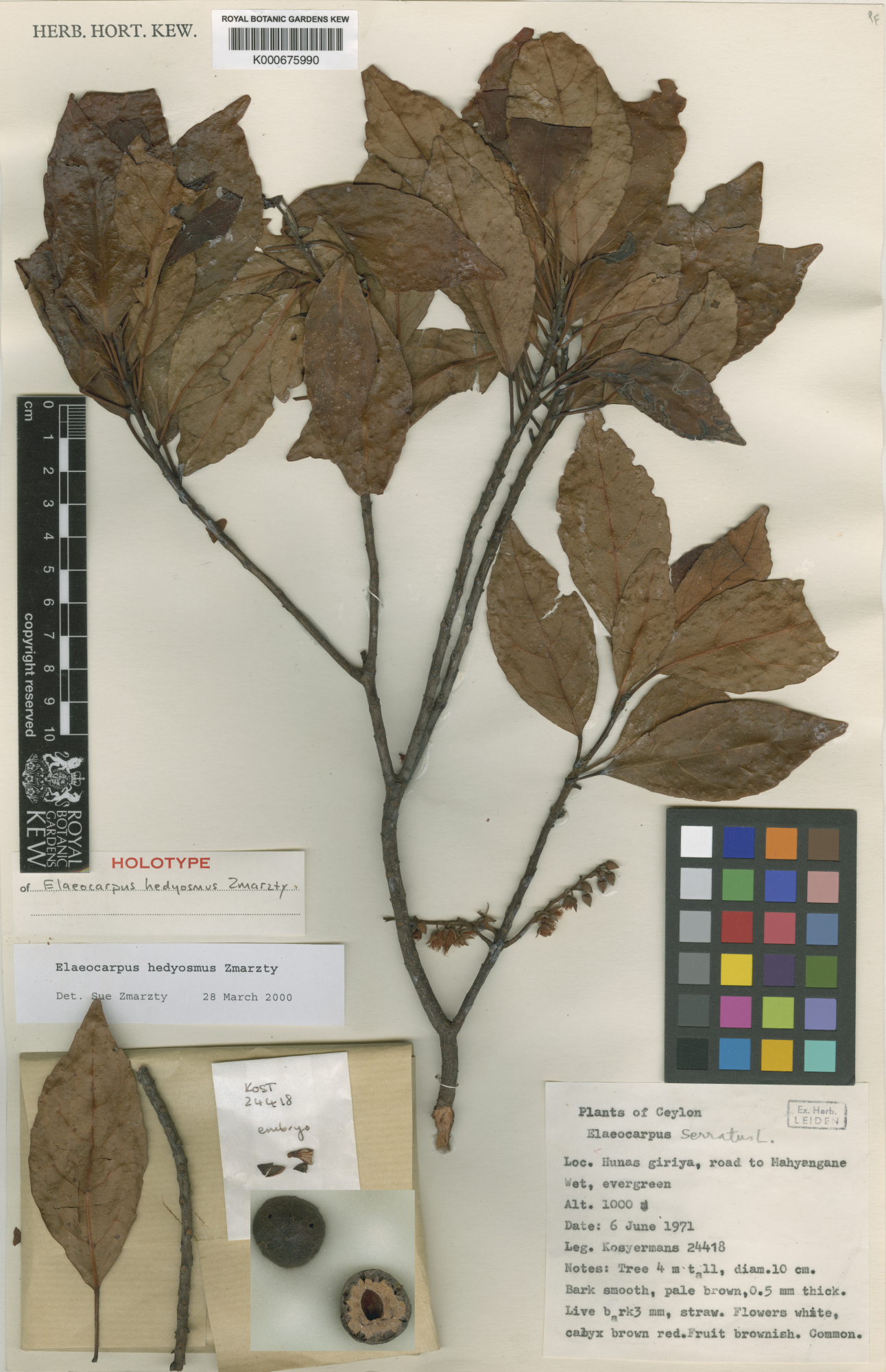

Scientific classification
- Kingdom: Plantae
- Clade: Tracheophytes
- Clade: Angiosperms
- Clade: Eudicots
- Clade: Rosids
- Order: Oxalidales
- Family: Elaeocarpaceae
- Genus: Elaeocarpus
- Species: E. hedyosmus

Binomial name
- Elaeocarpus hedyosmus Zmarzty

= Elaeocarpus hedyosmus =

Species of flowering plant endemic to Sri Lanka

Elaeocarpus hedyosmus is a species of flowering plant in the Elaeocarpaceae family used as a medicinal plant. It is one of three recently described species that is endemic to Sri Lanka.

== Taxonomic Revision ==
In 2001, botanist Sue Zmarzty revised the Elaeocarpus section of Elaeocarpus species found on southern India and Sri Lanka. According to that revision, nine species are recognised, which includes three new species: E. hedyosmus Zmarzty, E. variabilis Zmarzty and E. taprobanicus Zmarzty. The revision also includes one new variety of the species, E. serratus L. var. weibelii Zmarzty, as well.

Elaeocarpus hedyosmus is described through specimens previously considered to be E. amoenus sensu auctt.. Original syntypes of E. amoenus included three different species, and in the revision by Meijer's in 1995, lectotypification means that this name must be restricted to a distinct, less well-known species that is endemic to island of Sri Lanka.

Elaeocarpus variabilis is described through specimens previously considered to be E. glandulosus sensu auctt.. The species was also synonymized as E. oblongus sensu auct. previously, until it gives the full species validity. This suggested the species E. glandulosus must be applied to a northern species in India and also dry parts of Sri Lanka. It may be probably E. hygrophilus described in Merrill's in 1951 by his observations.
