= Dichilanthe =

Scientific classification
- Kingdom: Plantae
- Clade: Tracheophytes
- Clade: Angiosperms
- Clade: Eudicots
- Clade: Asterids
- Order: Gentianales
- Family: Rubiaceae
- Genus: Dichilanthe; Thwaites

Type species
- Dichilanthe zeylanica Thwaites

Genus of plants

Dichilanthe is a genus of flowering plants in the family Rubiaceae. The genus is found in Borneo and Sri Lanka.

== Species ==
- Dichilanthe borneensis Baill. - west-central Borneo
- Dichilanthe zeylanica Thwaites - southwestern Sri Lanka
