= Gironniera celtidifolia =

Scientific classification
- Kingdom: Plantae
- Clade: Tracheophytes
- Clade: Angiosperms
- Clade: Eudicots
- Clade: Rosids
- Order: Rosales
- Family: Cannabaceae
- Genus: Gironniera
- Species: G. celtidifolia

Binomial name
- Gironniera celtidifolia Gaudich.

Species of tree

Gironniera celtidifolia is a species of tree in the family Cannabaceae. Its native range is limited to south-east Asia.
