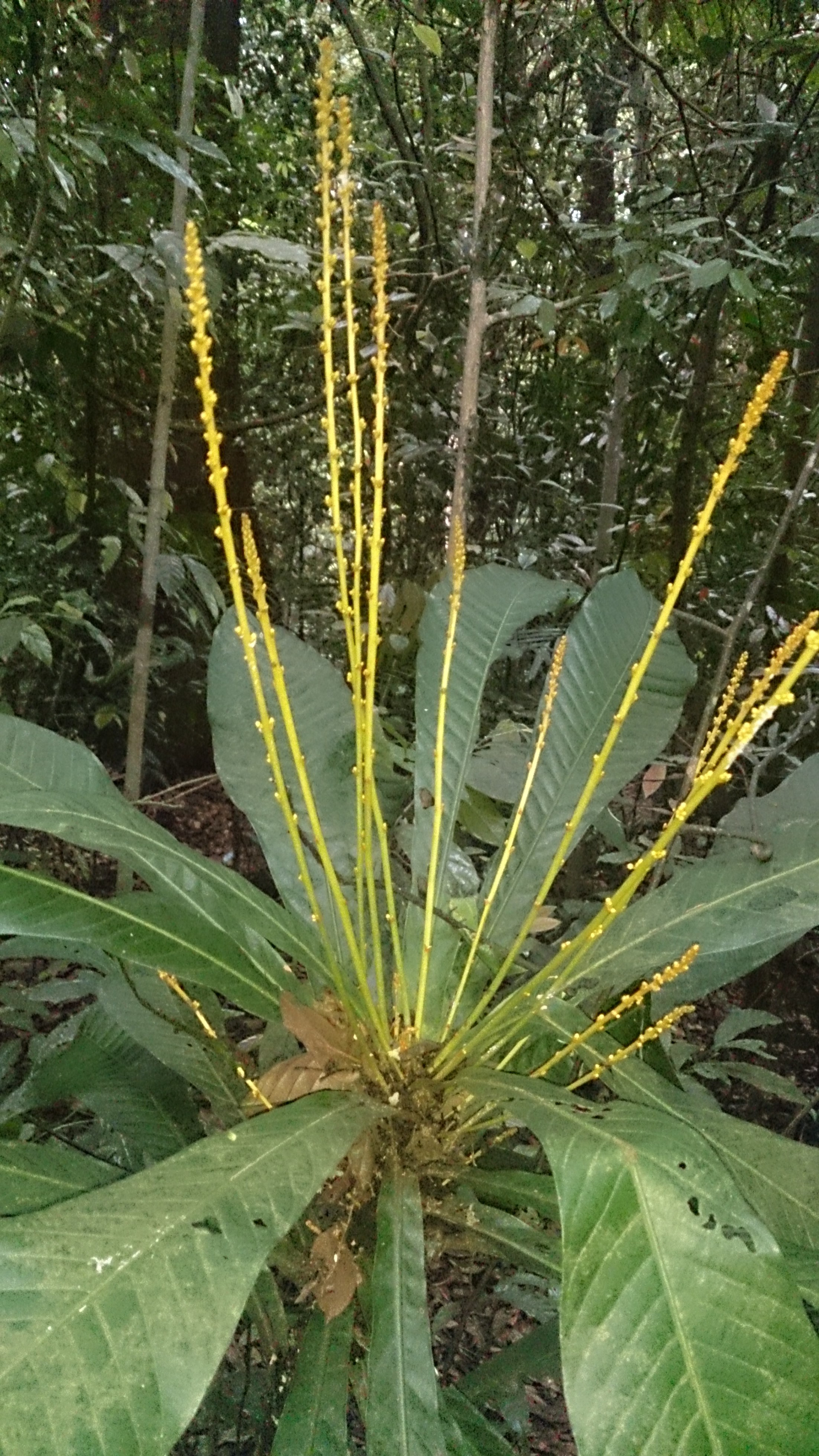
- Agrostistachys borneensis

Scientific classification
- Kingdom: Plantae
- Clade: Tracheophytes
- Clade: Angiosperms
- Clade: Eudicots
- Clade: Rosids
- Order: Malpighiales
- Family: Euphorbiaceae
- Subfamily: Acalyphoideae
- Tribe: Agrostistachydeae
- Genus: Agrostistachys; Dalzell

Synonyms
- Sarcoclinium Wight; Heterocalyx Gagnep.

= Agrostistachys =

Genus of flowering plants

Agrostistachys is a plant genus of the family Euphorbiaceae first described as a genus in 1850. It is native to Southeast Asia, New Guinea, India, and Sri Lanka.

Species

1. Agrostistachys borneensis Becc. - India, Sri Lanka, Thailand, Vietnam, Malaysia, Borneo, Philippines, Sumatra, New Guinea
2. Agrostistachys gaudichaudii Müll.Arg. - Thailand, Peninsular Malaysia
3. Agrostistachys hookeri (Thwaites) Benth. & Hook.f. - Sri Lanka
4. Agrostistachys indica Dalzell - India, Sri Lanka, Thailand, Vietnam, Myanmar, Laos, Cambodia, Malaysia, Borneo, Philippines, New Guinea
5. Agrostistachys sessilifolia (Kurz) Pax & K.Hoffm. - Peninsular Malaysia, Borneo, Sumatra
6. Agrostistachys staminodiata Sevilla - Sumatra

formerly included

moved to other genera (Pseudagrostistachys Tannodia Wetria )

1. A. africana - Pseudagrostistachys africana
2. A. comorensis - Tannodia cordifolia
3. A. pubescens - Wetria insignis
4. A. ugandensis - Pseudagrostistachys ugandensis
