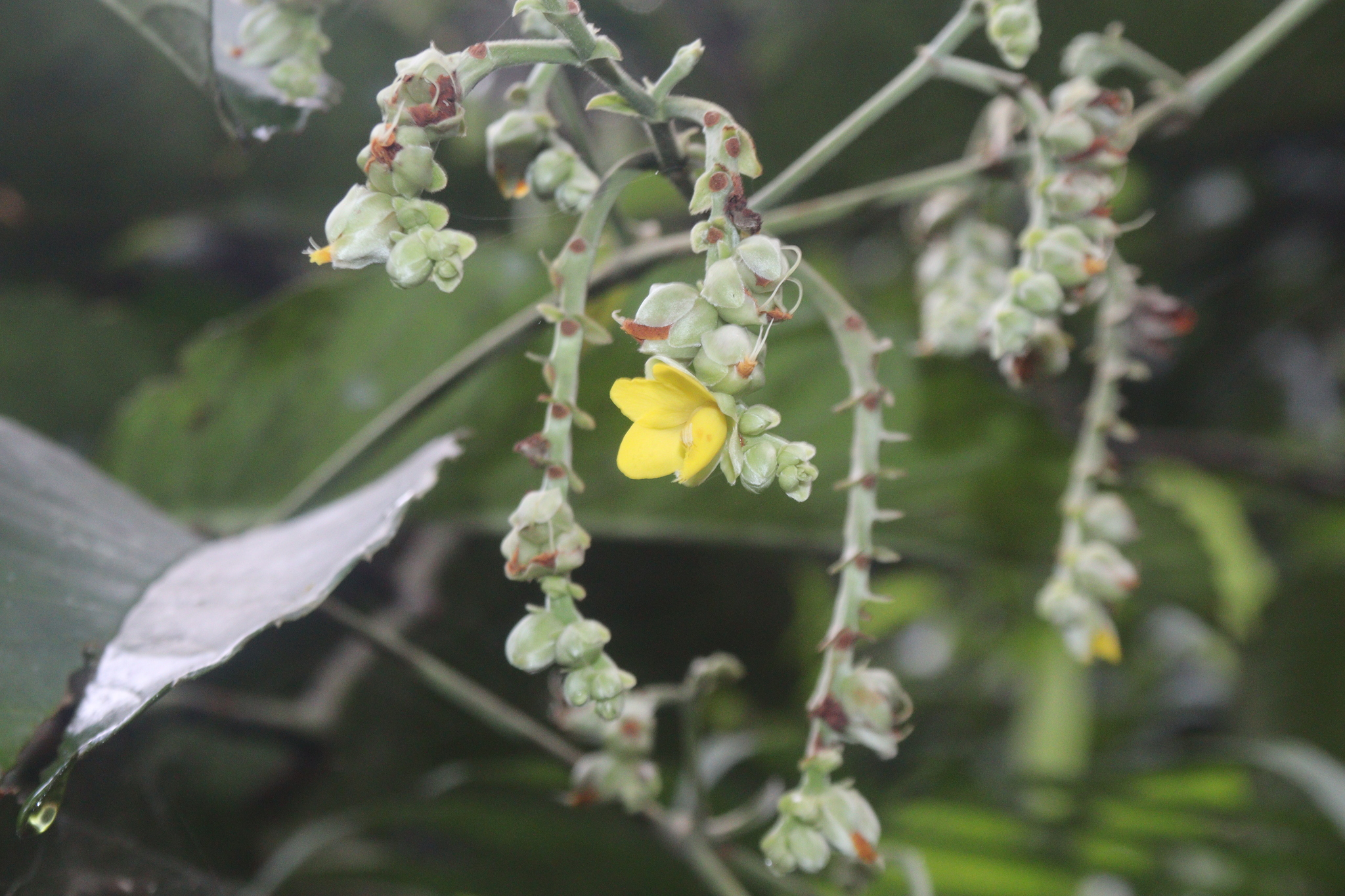

Scientific classification
- Kingdom: Plantae
- Clade: Tracheophytes
- Clade: Angiosperms
- Clade: Eudicots
- Order: Dilleniales
- Family: Dilleniaceae
- Genus: Schumacheria
- Species: S. castaneifolia

Binomial name
- Schumacheria castaneifolia Vahl

= Schumacheria castaneifolia =

Species of flowering plant

Schumacheria castaneifolia is a species of flowering plant in the family Dilleniaceae. It is endemic to Sri Lanka.
