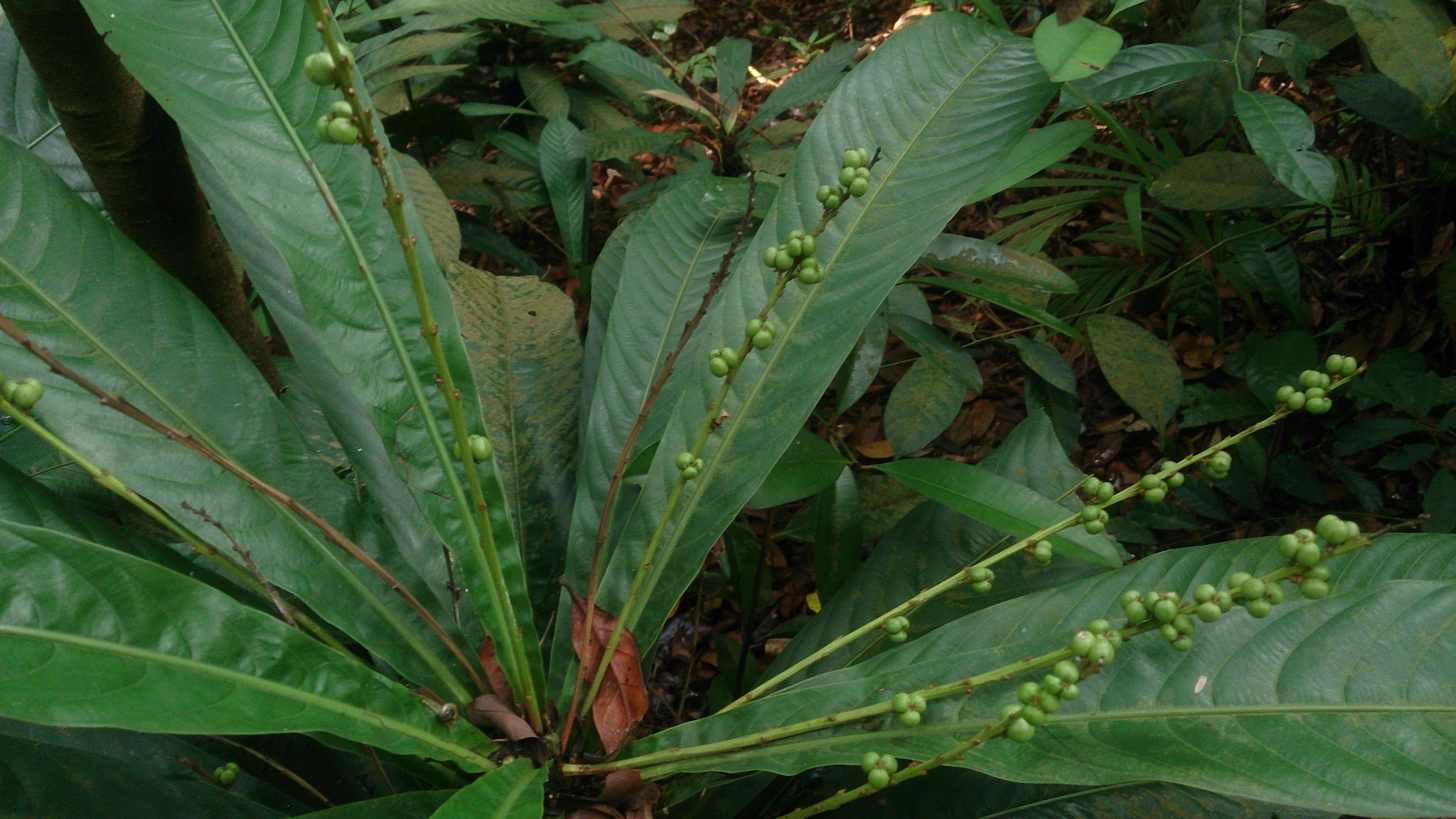

Conservation status
- Least Concern (IUCN 3.1)

Scientific classification
- Kingdom: Plantae
- Clade: Tracheophytes
- Clade: Angiosperms
- Clade: Eudicots
- Clade: Rosids
- Order: Malpighiales
- Family: Euphorbiaceae
- Genus: Agrostistachys
- Species: A. borneensis

Binomial name
- Agrostistachys borneensis Becc.

Synonyms
- Agrostistachys coriacea Alston, superfluous name; Agrostistachys intramarginalis Philcox; Agrostistachys latifolia (Hook.f.) Pax & K.Hoffm.; Agrostistachys leptostachya Pax & K.Hoffm.; Agrostistachys longifolia (Wight) Trimen 1885, illegitimate homonym, not Kurz 1877 nor (Müll.Arg.) Kurz 1875; Agrostistachys meeboldii Pax & K.Hoffm.; Sarcoclinium longifolium Wight

= Agrostistachys borneensis =

Species of flowering plant

Agrostistachys borneensis is a species of plant in the family Euphorbiaceae. It is a widespread plant native to much of Southeast Asia as well as India, Sri Lanka, and New Guinea.

== Culture ==
Known as බෙරු (beru) in Sinhala.
