= Dichilanthe zeylanica =

Conservation status
- Endangered (IUCN 2.3)

Scientific classification
- Kingdom: Plantae
- Clade: Tracheophytes
- Clade: Angiosperms
- Clade: Eudicots
- Clade: Asterids
- Order: Gentianales
- Family: Rubiaceae
- Genus: Dichilanthe
- Species: D. zeylanica

Binomial name
- Dichilanthe zeylanica Thwaites.

Species of plant

Dichilanthe zeylanica is a species of flowering plant in the family Rubiaceae. It is endemic to Sri Lanka. It is a tree that grows in evergreen forest habitat.
