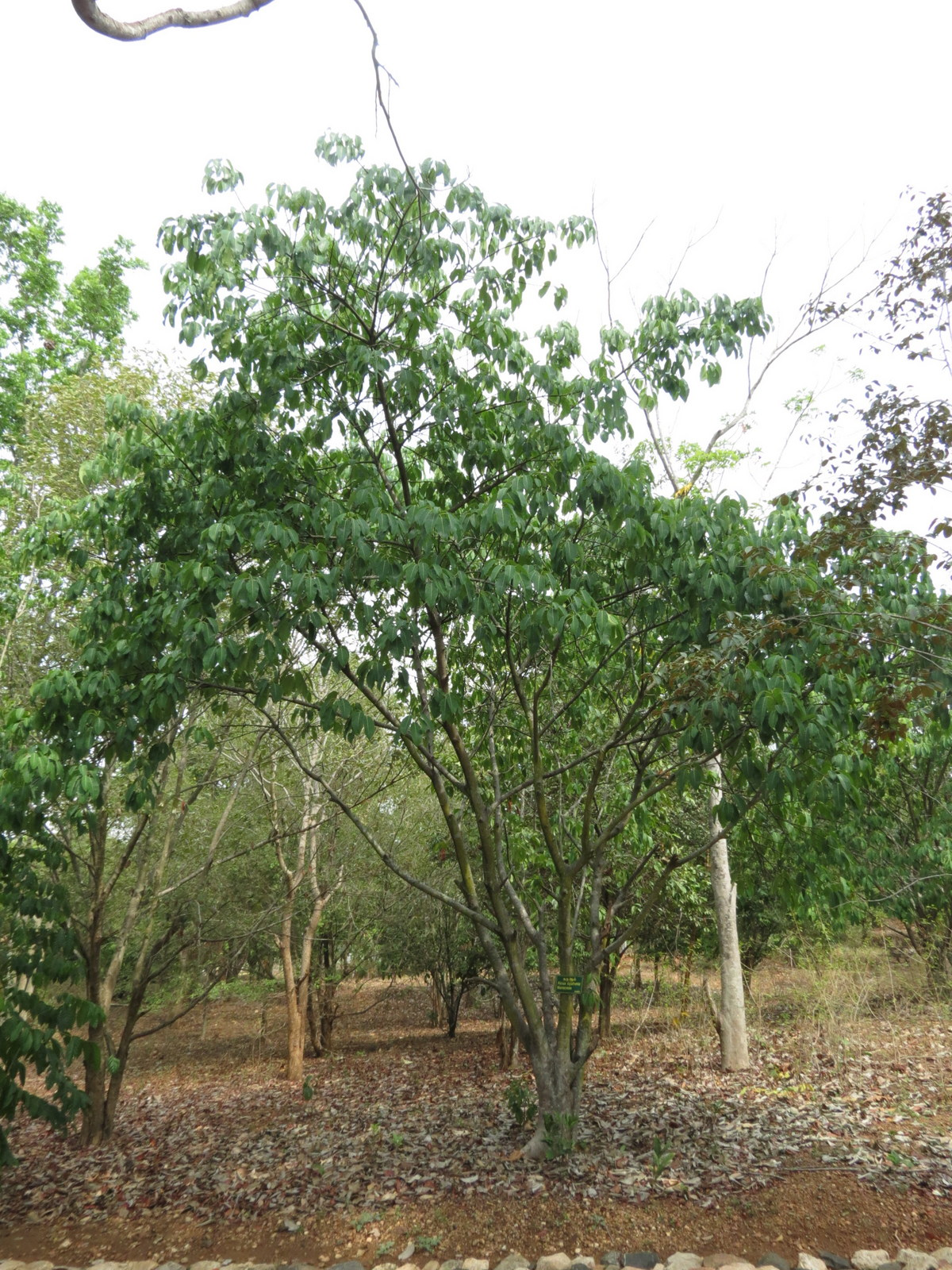
- In Nilgiri Biosphere Reserve, India

Conservation status
- Least Concern (IUCN 3.1)

Scientific classification
- Kingdom: Plantae
- Clade: Tracheophytes
- Clade: Angiosperms
- Clade: Eudicots
- Clade: Rosids
- Order: Rosales
- Family: Moraceae
- Genus: Ficus
- Species: F. tsjakela

Binomial name
- Ficus tsjakela Burm.f.

Synonyms
- Ficus caulobotrya (Miq.) Miq.; Ficus infectoria Willd.; Ficus tsjahela Burm.f., alternate spelling; Ficus venosa Aiton; Urostigma caulobotryum Miq.; Urostigma ceylonense Miq.; Urostigma infectorium (Willd.) Miq.; Urostigma tsjakela (Burm.f.) Miq.

= Ficus tsjakela =

Species of flowering plant

Ficus tsjakela is a fig tree from the family Moraceae which is found in peninsular India, Sri Lanka, southern Pakistan (Sindh), It is commonly known as the kaaral in Malayalam, kal-aal in Tamil and boviyamara in Kannada., Bangladesh, Myanmar, and Vietnam.

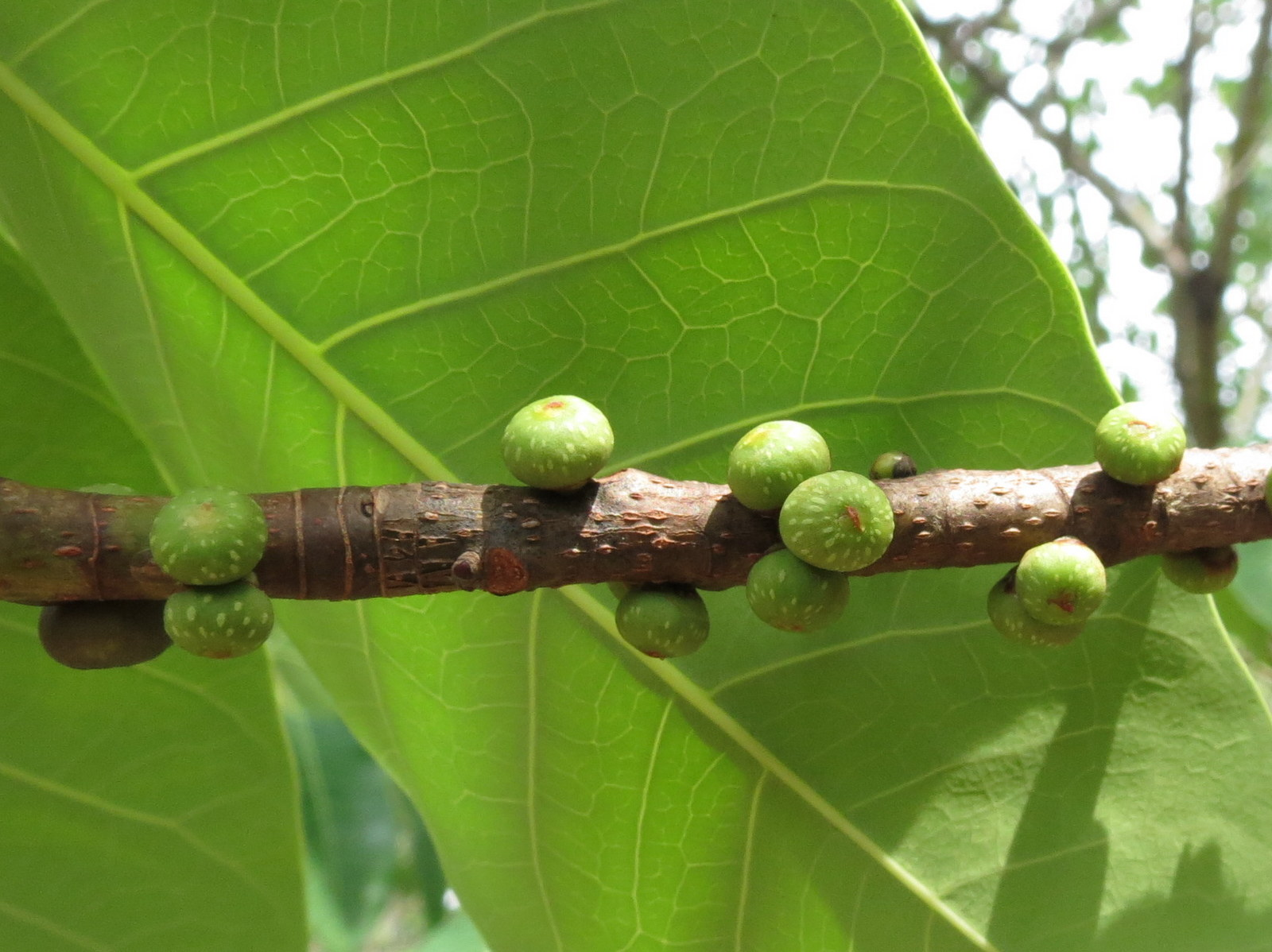
Fig

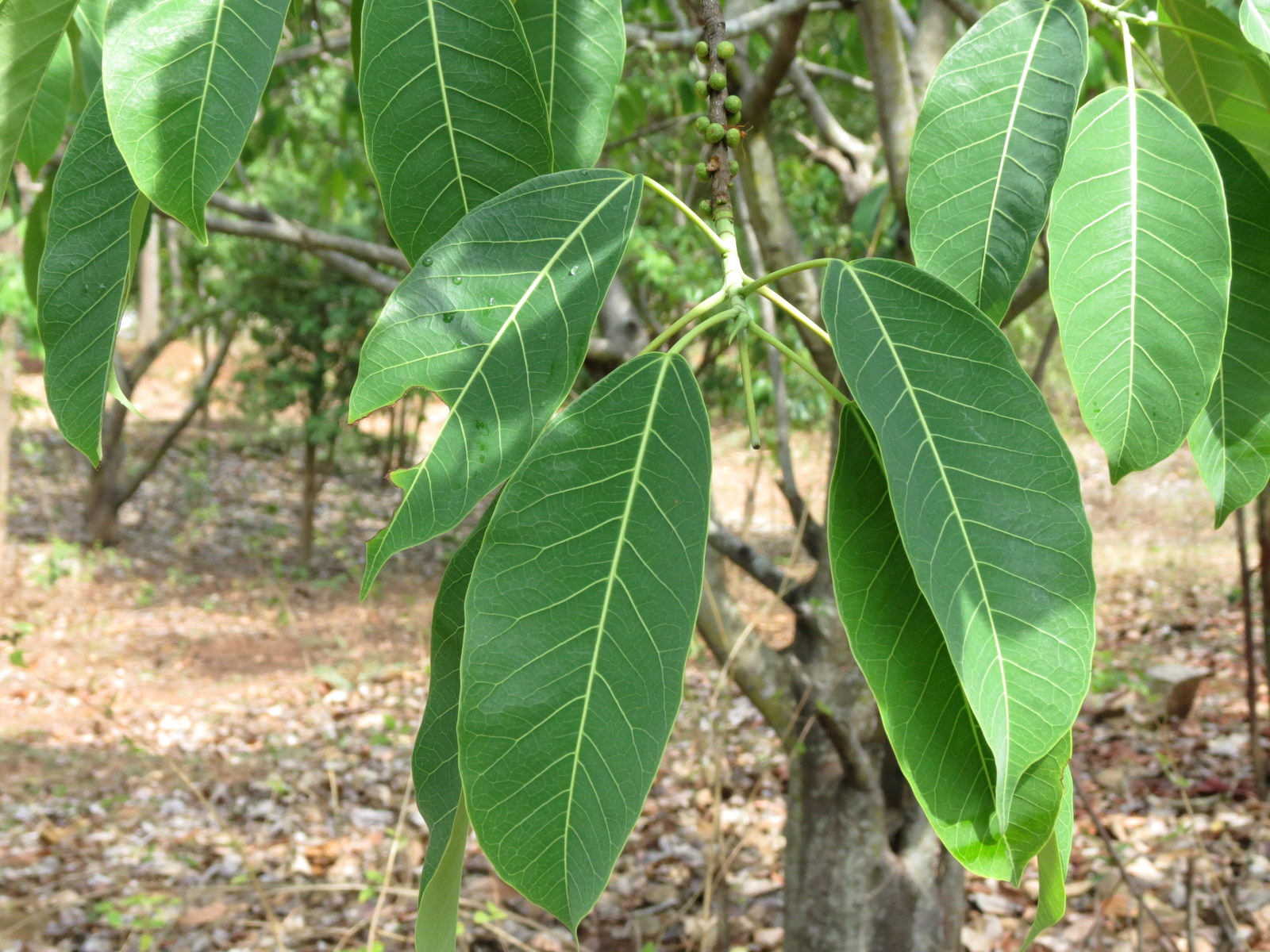
Leaves

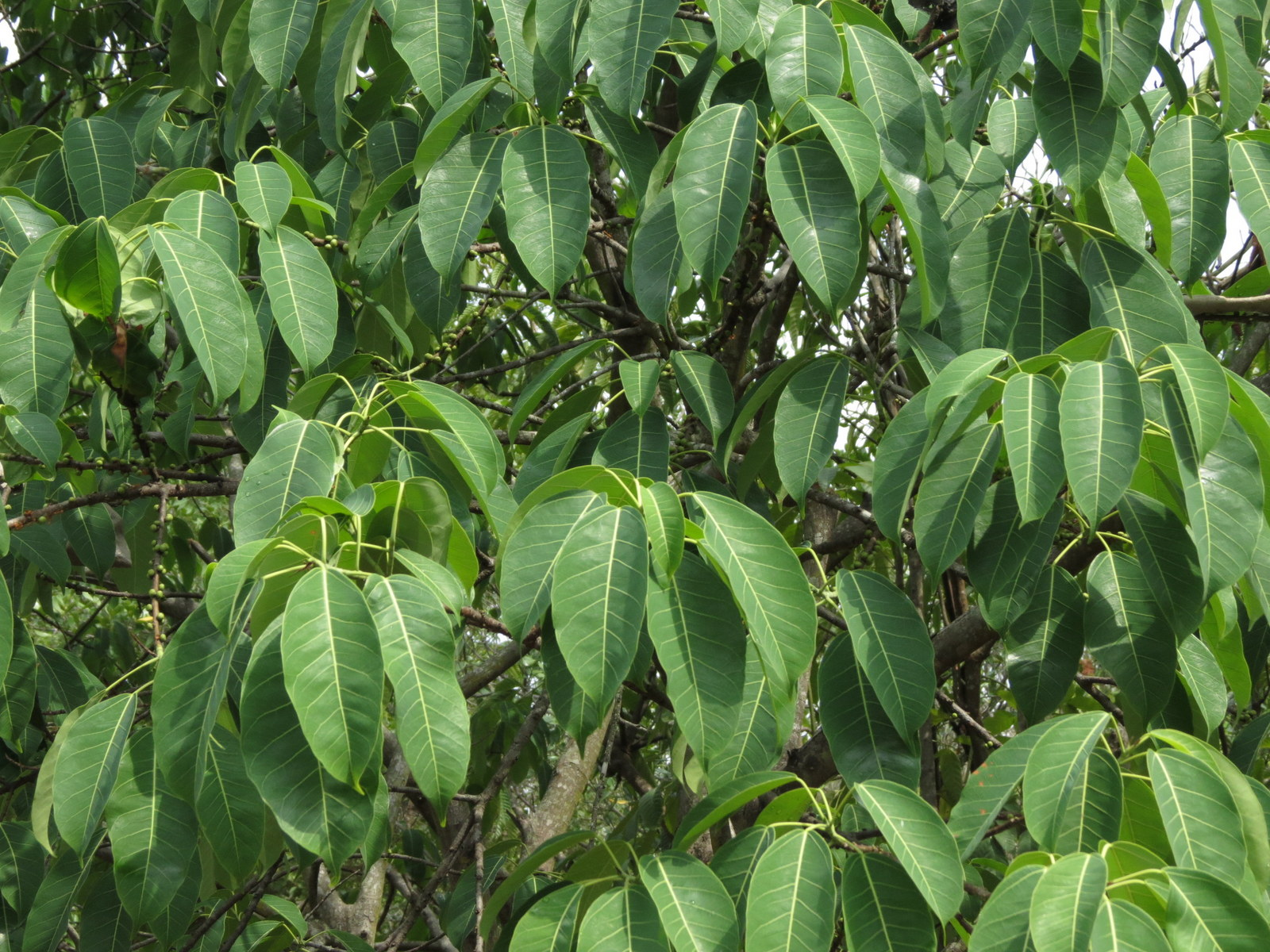
Leaves

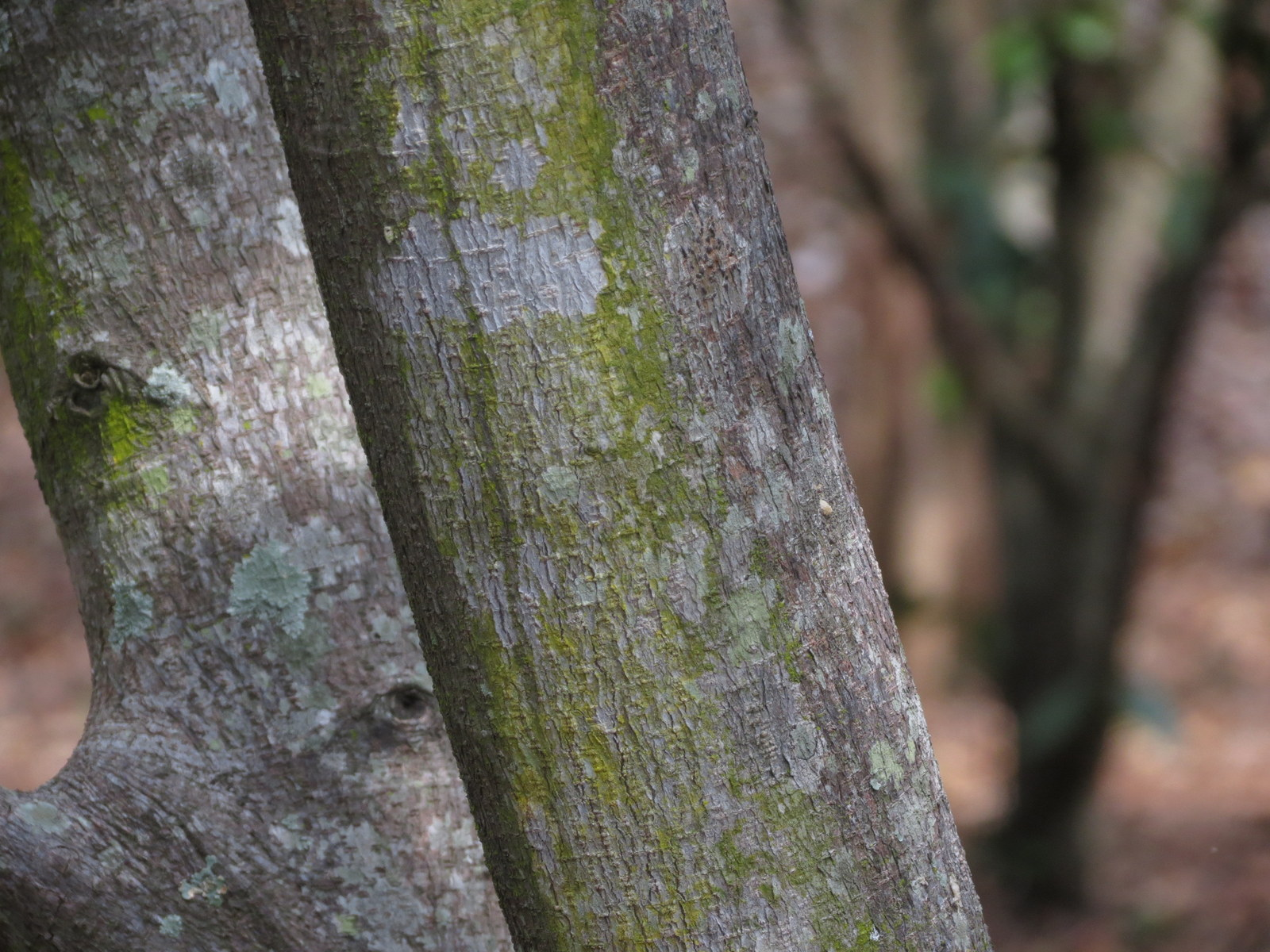
Bark

== Distribution and habitat ==
In India, Ficus tsjakela occurs in coastal regions of Maharashtra and Karnataka, all districts of Kerala and in many districts of Tamil Nadu. In Maharashtra, the tree is found in Ahmednagar, Ratnagiri, Satara and Sindhudurg districts. In Karnataka, F. tsjahela occurs in Chikmagalur, Hassan, Mysore, Shimoga, North and South Kanara districts. In Tamil Nadu, the tree ranges in Coimbatore, Dharmapuri, Kanyakumari, Nilgiri, Salem, Tirunelveli, Tiruvannamalai, Vellore and Viluppuram. In Kerala, the tree is reported from Neeliyar Kottam, a sacred grove in Kannur District. It grows in tropical moist evergreen and deciduous forests from sea level up to 1,100 metres elevation. Its fruits are a food source for birds and mammals including hornbills.

== Field description ==
=== Habit ===
Deciduous trees up to 25 m tall.

=== Trunk and bark ===
Bark dark brown; blaze red.

=== Branches and branchlets ===
Branchlets terete, glabrous. Exudates

Latex white, profuse.

=== Leaves ===
Leaves simple, alternate, spiral; stipules foliaceous, 0.7 cm long, caducous and leaving annular scar; petiole ca. 6 cm long, canaliculate, glabrous; lamina to 20 x 8 cm, oblong, elliptic-oblong, apex acuminate, base rounded, coriaceous, margin entire, glabrous and glossy; basally 3-nerved; midrib raised above; secondary nerves 6-10 pairs, prominent and parallel, looped near the margin; tertiary nerves reticulate.

=== Inflorescence / flower ===
Inflorescence syconia, sessile, depressed-globose, in clusters of 2-6, on very short crowded tubercles in the axils of the leaves or most frequently at the scars of fallen leaves; flowers unisexual.

=== Fruit and seeds ===
Syconium, sessile, ca. 0.5 cm across, greenish; achenes smooth.
