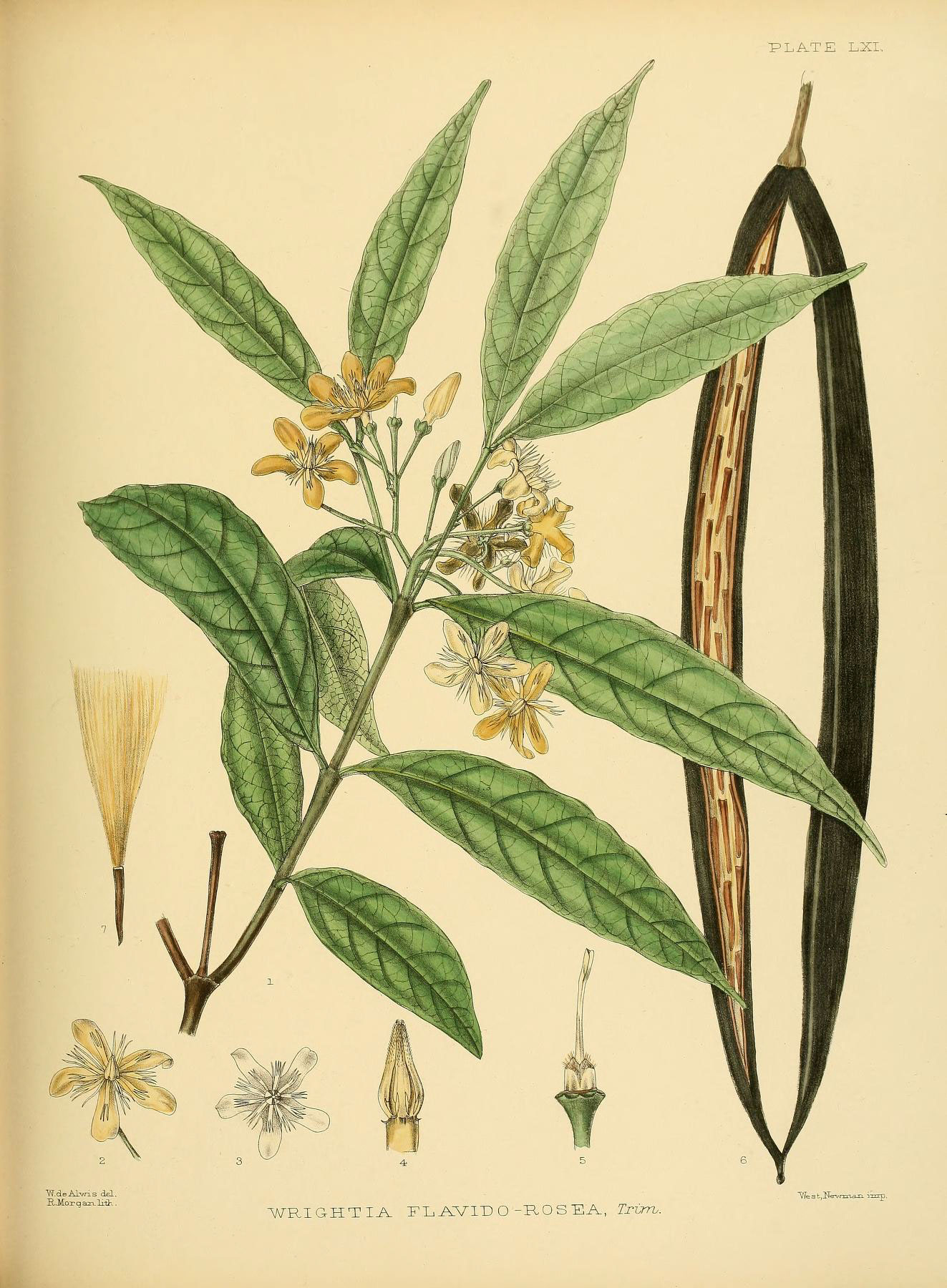

Scientific classification
- Kingdom: Plantae
- Clade: Tracheophytes
- Clade: Angiosperms
- Clade: Eudicots
- Clade: Asterids
- Order: Gentianales
- Family: Apocynaceae
- Genus: Wrightia
- Species: W. flavorosea

Binomial name
- Wrightia flavorosea Trimen

= Wrightia flavorosea =

Species of plant

Wrightia flavorosea, was a flowering plant in the genus Wrightia. It was endemic to Sri Lanka, where the plant is known to be extinct. The plant was first described by Henry Trimen in 1885.
