= Syzygium neesianum =

Conservation status
- Vulnerable (IUCN 3.1)

Scientific classification
- Kingdom: Plantae
- Clade: Tracheophytes
- Clade: Angiosperms
- Clade: Eudicots
- Clade: Rosids
- Order: Myrtales
- Family: Myrtaceae
- Genus: Syzygium
- Species: S. neesianum

Binomial name
- Syzygium neesianum Arn.

Synonyms
- Eugenia neesiana (Arn.) Wight

Species of flowering plant

Syzygium neesianum is a species of flowering plant in the family Myrtaceae. It is a tree native to Sri Lanka and southern India. It is a large tree, up to 25 metres tall, with edible fruits which are a food source for birds and mammals.

It is native to the southern Western Ghats of Kerala and Tamil Nadu in southwestern India, and to southwestern Sri Lanka. grows in submontane and montane evergreen rain forests from 800 to 1,400 metres elevation. It has an estimated population of about 1,000 mature individuals within six subpopulations, including in Vellarimala, Silent Valley, and Agasthyamala in the southern Western Ghats.

The species is threatened with habitat loss from forest clearance for agriculture and road and dam construction. The IUCN Red List assesses the species as Vulnerable.

The species was described by George Arnott Walker-Arnott in 1836.
