= Lasianthus walkerianus =

Scientific classification
- Kingdom: Plantae
- Clade: Tracheophytes
- Clade: Angiosperms
- Clade: Eudicots
- Clade: Asterids
- Order: Gentianales
- Family: Rubiaceae
- Genus: Lasianthus
- Species: L. walkerianus

Binomial name
- Lasianthus walkerianus Wight

Species of plant

Lasianthus walkerianus is a species of plant in the family Rubiaceae. It is endemic to Sri Lanka.
