= Syzygium spathulatum =

Conservation status
- Endangered (IUCN 2.3)

Scientific classification
- Kingdom: Plantae
- Clade: Tracheophytes
- Clade: Angiosperms
- Clade: Eudicots
- Clade: Rosids
- Order: Myrtales
- Family: Myrtaceae
- Genus: Syzygium
- Species: S. spathulatum

Binomial name
- Syzygium spathulatum Thwaites

Synonyms
- Eugenia olivifolia Duthie; Eugenia spathulata (Thwaites) Bedd., nom. illeg. homonym. post.; Syzygium olivifolium (Duthie) Gamble, nom. superfl.

Species of flowering plant

Syzygium spathulatum is a species of flowering plant in the family Myrtaceae. It is a tree endemic to Sri Lanka. It grows in dry forests and moist forests.
