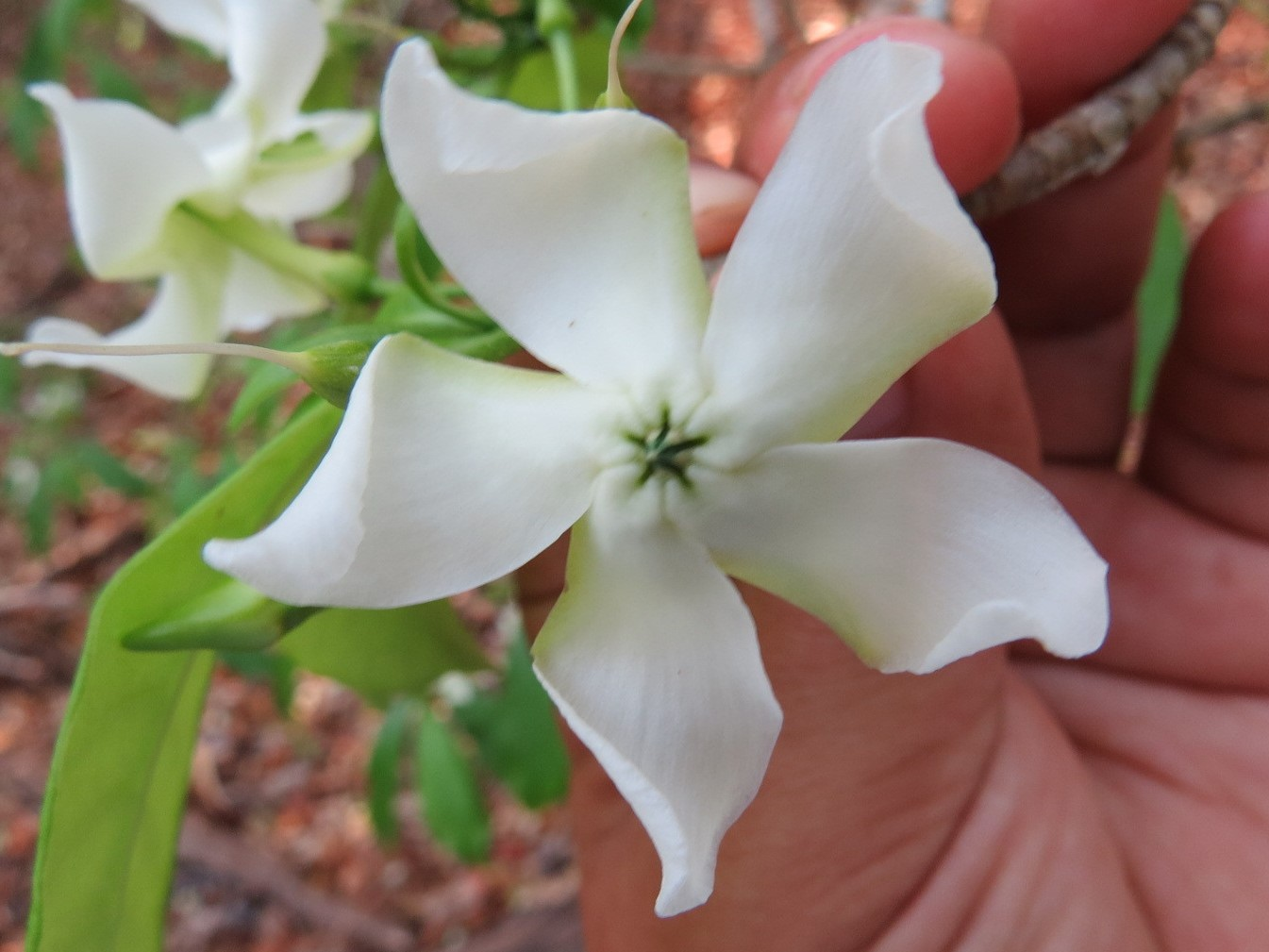

Conservation status
- Least Concern (IUCN 3.1)

Scientific classification
- Kingdom: Plantae
- Clade: Tracheophytes
- Clade: Angiosperms
- Clade: Eudicots
- Clade: Asterids
- Order: Gentianales
- Family: Apocynaceae
- Genus: Tabernaemontana
- Species: T. amygdalifolia

Binomial name
- Tabernaemontana amygdalifolia Jacq.

Synonyms
- Ervatamia jasminoides (Kunth) Tsiang; Malouetia jasminoides (Kunth) A.DC.; Rauvolfia laevigata Roem. & Schult.; Tabernaemontana acapulcensis Miers; Tabernaemontana deamii Donn.Sm.; Tabernaemontana jasminoides Kunth; Tabernaemontana nereifolia Vahl; Tabernaemontana occidentalis Miers

= Tabernaemontana amygdalifolia =

Species of plant

Tabernaemontana amygdalifolia is a species of plant in the family Apocynaceae. It is native to southern Mexico, Central America, Cuba, Haiti, and northwestern South America.
