= Syzygium cordifolium =

Conservation status
- Vulnerable (IUCN 2.3)

Scientific classification
- Kingdom: Plantae
- Clade: Tracheophytes
- Clade: Angiosperms
- Clade: Eudicots
- Clade: Rosids
- Order: Myrtales
- Family: Myrtaceae
- Genus: Syzygium
- Species: S. cordifolium

Binomial name
- Syzygium cordifolium (Wight) Walp.

Subspecies
- Syzygium cordifolium subsp. cordifolium; Syzygium cordifolium subsp. spissum P.S.Ashton

Synonyms
- Eugenia cordifolia Wight; synonyms of subsp. cordifolium: Calyptranthes cordifolia Moon, nom. nud.; Eugenia androsaemoides Bedd.; synonyms of subsp. spissum: Eugenia androsaemoides (L.) DC.; Myrtus androsaemoides L.; Syzygium androsaemoides (L.) Walp.; Syzygium spissum Alston, nom. illeg. superfl.

Species of flowering plant

Syzygium cordifolium is a species of flowering plant in the family Myrtaceae. It is a tree endemic to Sri Lanka.

Two subspecies are accepted:

- Syzygium cordifolium subsp. cordifolium
- Syzygium cordifolium subsp. spissum P.S.Ashton

The IUCN Red List assesses both subspecies as Vulnerable.
