= Diplospora erythrospora =

Conservation status
- Critically Endangered (IUCN 2.3)

Scientific classification
- Kingdom: Plantae
- Clade: Tracheophytes
- Clade: Angiosperms
- Clade: Eudicots
- Clade: Asterids
- Order: Gentianales
- Family: Rubiaceae
- Genus: Diplospora
- Species: D. erythrospora

Binomial name
- Diplospora erythrospora (Thwaites) Hook.f.

Synonyms
- Tricalysia erythrospora (Thwaites) Alston Discospermum erythrosporum Thwaites

Species of plant

Diplospora erythrospora is a species of plant in the family Rubiaceae. It is endemic to Sri Lanka.

== Appearance ==
Shrub to Small tree.

== Leaves ==
oval, base tapered, apex rounded to abruptly pointed, margin rolled down, glandular pits in vein axils beneath; petiole very short.

== Trunk ==
branchlets stout, thickened at nodes; twigs compressed, glabrous.

== Flowers ==
pale greenish yellow, small, nearly sessile; Inflorescence - dense cymes.

== Fruits ==
ovaoid-subglobose berry, pulp purple; seeds bright red.

== Ecology ==
montane forest understory
