= Syzygium makul =

Conservation status
- Vulnerable (IUCN 2.3)

Scientific classification
- Kingdom: Plantae
- Clade: Tracheophytes
- Clade: Angiosperms
- Clade: Eudicots
- Clade: Rosids
- Order: Myrtales
- Family: Myrtaceae
- Genus: Syzygium
- Species: S. makul

Binomial name
- Syzygium makul Gaertn.

Synonyms
- Calyptranthes makul (Gaertn.) Raeusch.; Eugenia sylvestris Moon ex Wight; Myrtus makul (Gaertn.) J.F.Gmel.; Syzygium sylvestre (Moon ex Wight) Walp.

Species of flowering plant

Syzygium makul is a species of flowering plant in the family Myrtaceae. It is a tree native to Sri Lanka and Kerala in southwestern India. In Sri Lanka it grows in lowland rain forest in the island's southwest.
