= Pandanus thwaitesii =

Scientific classification
- Kingdom: Plantae
- Clade: Tracheophytes
- Clade: Angiosperms
- Clade: Monocots
- Order: Pandanales
- Family: Pandanaceae
- Genus: Pandanus
- Species: P. thwaitesii

Binomial name
- Pandanus thwaitesii Martelli

Synonyms
- Pandanus foetidus var. racemosus Trimen

Species of flowering plant

Pandanus thwaitesii is a monocot species of plant in the family Pandanaceae. It is native to India, Sri Lanka.

== Uses ==
leaves- mats, boxes.

== Sources ==
- http://www.theplantlist.org/tpl/record/kew-285024
