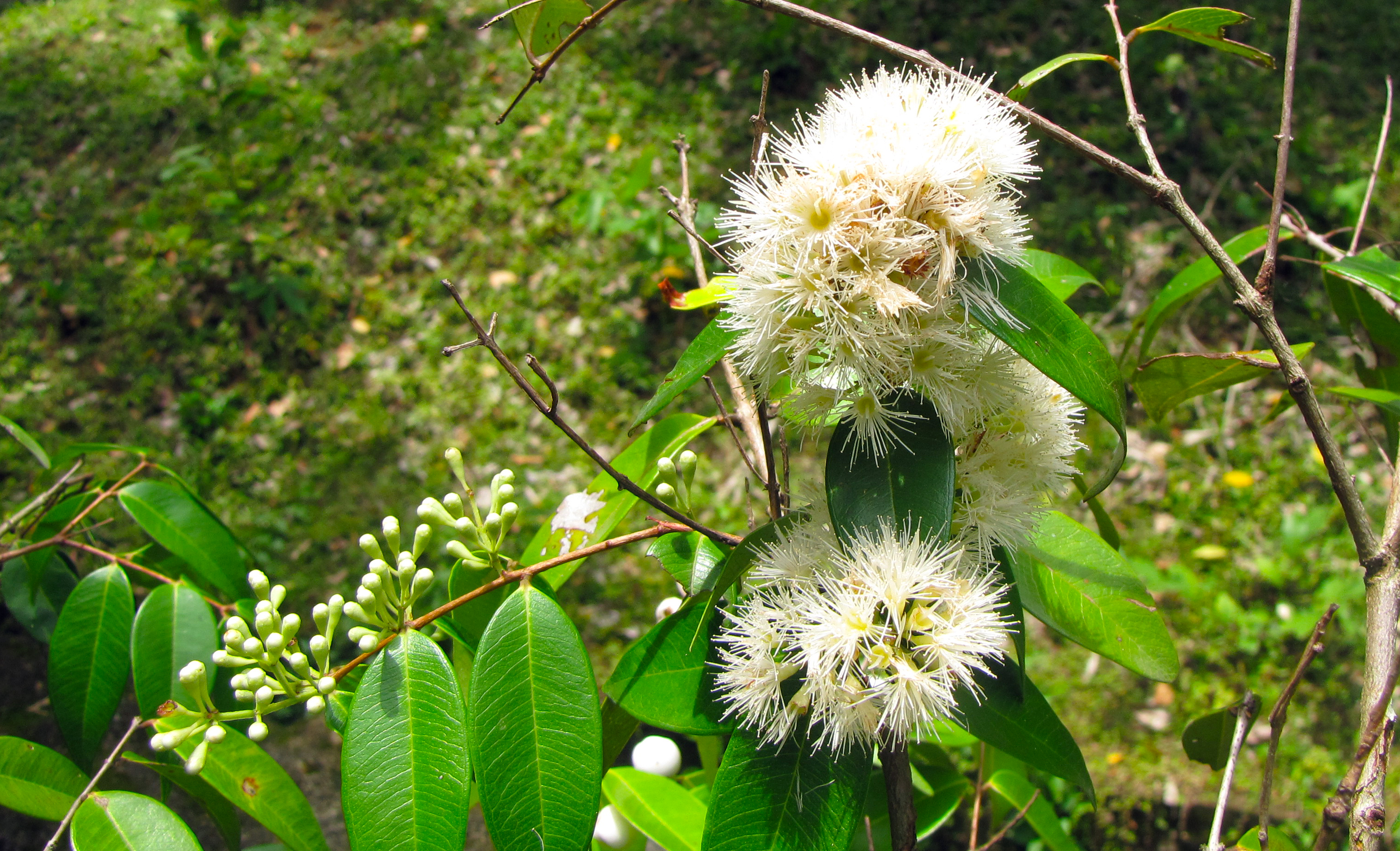
- Flowers
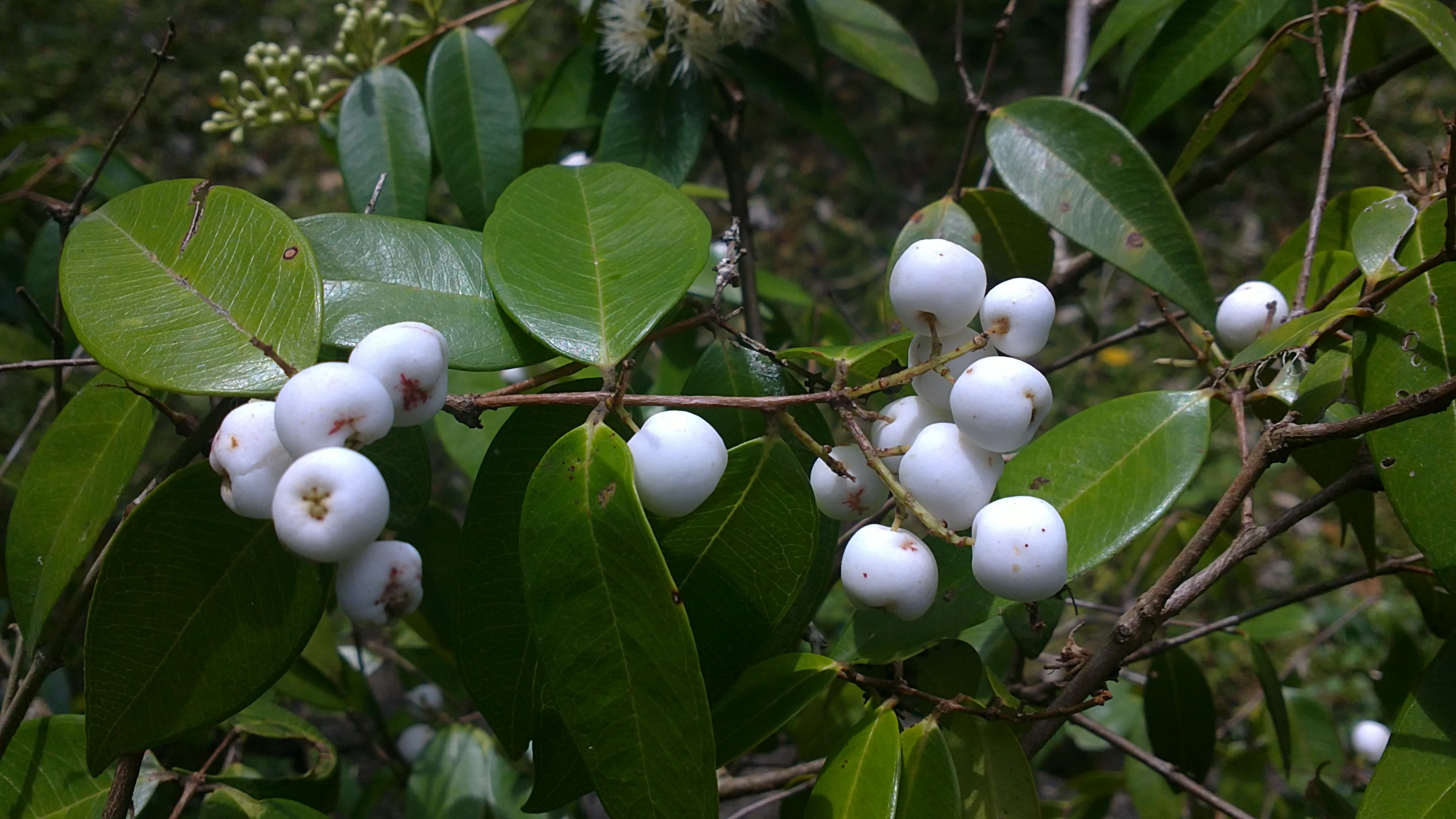
- Fruit

Scientific classification
- Kingdom: Plantae
- Clade: Tracheophytes
- Clade: Angiosperms
- Clade: Eudicots
- Clade: Rosids
- Order: Myrtales
- Family: Myrtaceae
- Genus: Syzygium
- Species: S. zeylanicum

Binomial name
- Syzygium zeylanicum (L.) DC.

Synonyms
- List: Acmena parviflora DC.; Acmena zeylanica (L.) Thwaites; Calyptranthes malabarica Dennst.; Caryophyllus rugosus Blume ex Miq.; Eugenia egensis var. tenuiramis (Miq.) O.Berg; Eugenia glandulifera Roxb.; Eugenia goudotiana H.Perrier; Eugenia linearis Duthie; Eugenia longicauda Ridl.; Eugenia macrorhyncha Miq.; Eugenia spicata Lam.; Eugenia spicata var. cordata Kochummen; Eugenia tenuiramis Miq.; Eugenia varians Miq.; Eugenia zeylanica (L.) Wight; Jambosa bracteata Miq.; Jambosa glandulifera (Roxb.) Miq.; Jambosa koenigii Blume; Myrtus zeylanica L.; Syzygium aqueum var. lineare (Wall. ex Gamble) Alston; Syzygium bellutta DC.; Syzygium coarctatum Blume ex Miq.; Syzygium lineare Wall. ex Gamble; Syzygium spicatum (Lam.) DC.; Syzygium zeylanicum var. ellipticum A.N.Henry, Chandrab. & N.C.Nair; Syzygium zeylanicum var. magamalayanum K.Ravik. & V.Lakshm.

= Syzygium zeylanicum =

Species of flowering plant

Syzygium zeylanicum, the spicate eugenia, is a species of flowering plant in the family Myrtaceae. It is widely distributed, from Madagascar and India to China, Southeast Asia, and Malesia. A shrubby tree typically reaching 12 m (39 ft), it prefers coastal secondary forests, forest edges, and riverbanks.
