= Beilschmiedia zeylanica =

Conservation status
- Vulnerable (IUCN 3.1)

Scientific classification
- Kingdom: Plantae
- Clade: Tracheophytes
- Clade: Angiosperms
- Clade: Magnoliids
- Order: Laurales
- Family: Lauraceae
- Genus: Beilschmiedia
- Species: B. zeylanica

Binomial name
- Beilschmiedia zeylanica Trimen

Species of flowering plant

Beilschmiedia zeylanica is a species of flowering plant in the family Lauraceae. It is a tree which grows up to 20 metres tall and is endemic to southwestern Sri Lanka. It grows in lowland and montane rain forests from 500 to 1,300 metres elevation. It is threatened by habitat loss from deforestation to expand farms, plantations, and mines.
