= Agrostistachys hookeri =

Conservation status
- Critically Endangered (IUCN 2.3)

Scientific classification
- Kingdom: Plantae
- Clade: Tracheophytes
- Clade: Angiosperms
- Clade: Eudicots
- Clade: Rosids
- Order: Malpighiales
- Family: Euphorbiaceae
- Genus: Agrostistachys
- Species: A. hookeri

Binomial name
- Agrostistachys hookeri (Thwaites) Benth. & Hook.f., 1880

Synonyms
- Sarcoclinium hookeri Thwaites, 1861

Species of flowering plant

Agrostistachys hookeri is a species of plant in the family Euphorbiaceae. It is endemic to Sri Lanka.

== Culture ==
The species is known as මහ බෙරු (maha beru) in Sinhala.
