= Schumacheria alnifolia =

Conservation status
- Critically Endangered (IUCN 2.3)

Scientific classification
- Kingdom: Plantae
- Clade: Tracheophytes
- Clade: Angiosperms
- Clade: Eudicots
- Order: Dilleniales
- Family: Dilleniaceae
- Genus: Schumacheria
- Species: S. alnifolia

Binomial name
- Schumacheria alnifolia Hook.f. & Thoms.

Species of flowering plant

Schumacheria alnifolia is a species of plant in the Dilleniaceae family. It is endemic to Sri Lanka.
