= Syzygium micranthum =

Conservation status
- Vulnerable (IUCN 2.3)

Scientific classification
- Kingdom: Plantae
- Clade: Tracheophytes
- Clade: Angiosperms
- Clade: Eudicots
- Clade: Rosids
- Order: Myrtales
- Family: Myrtaceae
- Genus: Syzygium
- Species: S. micranthum

Binomial name
- Syzygium micranthum Thwaites

Synonyms
- Eugenia micrantha (Thwaites) Bedd.

Species of flowering plant

Syzygium micranthum is a species of flowering plant in the family Myrtaceae. It is a tree endemic to Sri Lanka. It is native to southwestern Sri Lanka, where grows in lowland rain forest.

The species was described by George Henry Kendrick Thwaites in 1859.
