= Cyathocalyx zeylanicus =

Conservation status
- Least Concern (IUCN 3.1)

Scientific classification
- Kingdom: Plantae
- Clade: Embryophytes
- Clade: Tracheophytes
- Clade: Spermatophytes
- Clade: Angiosperms
- Clade: Magnoliids
- Order: Magnoliales
- Family: Annonaceae
- Genus: Cyathocalyx
- Species: C. zeylanicus

Binomial name
- Cyathocalyx zeylanicus Champ. ex Hook.f. & Thomson

Synonyms
- Soala litoralis Blanco

Species of flowering plant

Cyathocalyx zeylanicus is a plant species within the genus Cyathocalyx of the family Annonaceae. It is a tree native to Sri Lanka, Myanmar, and the Western Ghats of southwestern India.
