= Petiole =

Petiole may refer to:

- Petiole (botany), the stalk of a leaf, attaching the blade to the stem
- Petiole (insect anatomy), the narrow waist of some hymenopteran insects
