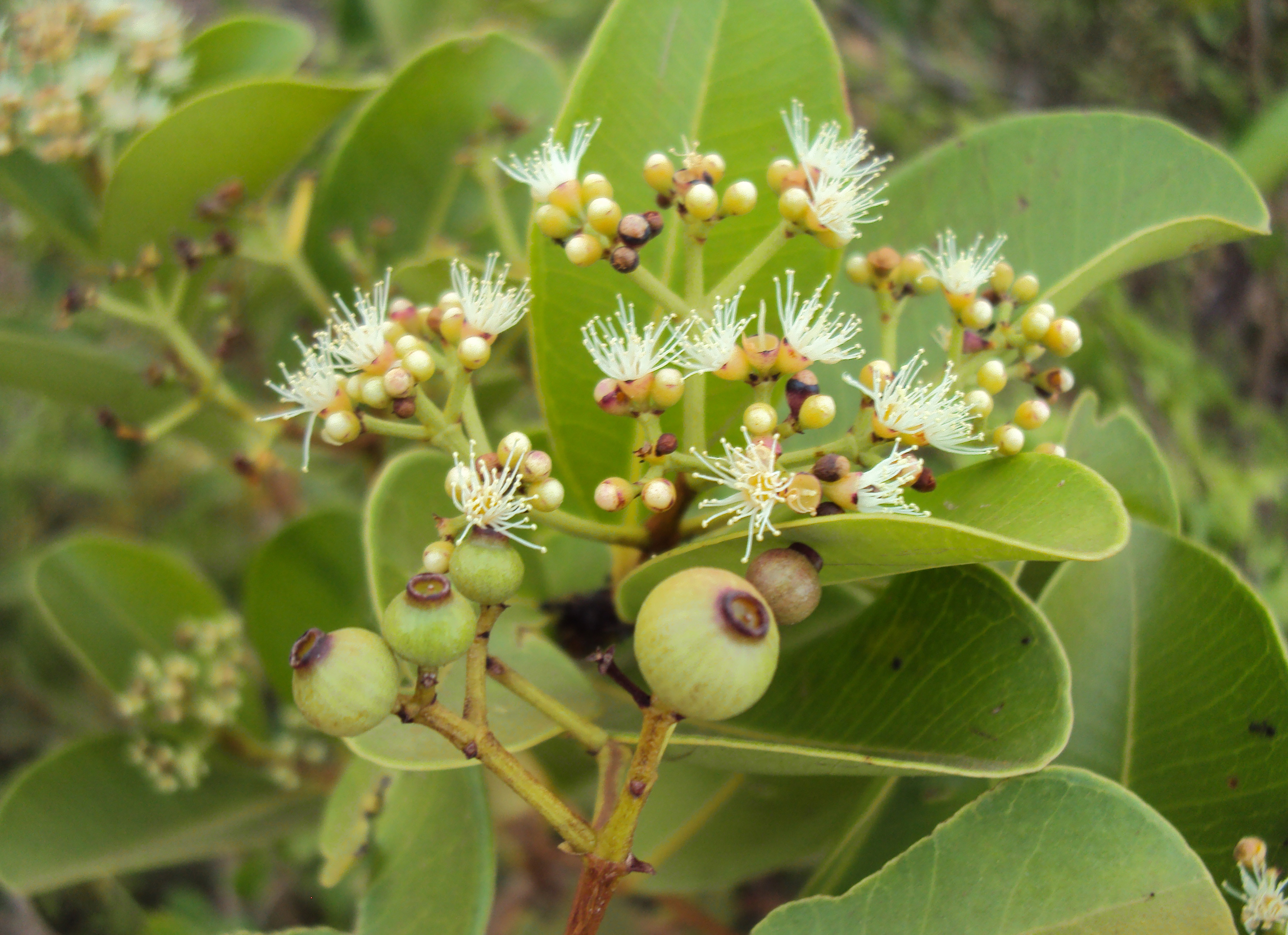

Conservation status
- Vulnerable (IUCN 3.1)

Scientific classification
- Kingdom: Plantae
- Clade: Tracheophytes
- Clade: Angiosperms
- Clade: Eudicots
- Clade: Rosids
- Order: Myrtales
- Family: Myrtaceae
- Genus: Syzygium
- Species: S. caryophyllatum

Binomial name
- Syzygium caryophyllatum (L.) Alston

Synonyms
- Calyptranthes caryophyllata (L.) Pers.; Myrtus caryophyllata L.; Eugenia caryophyllaea Wight; Eugenia corymbosa Lam.; Syzygium bournei Murugan & Arum.; Syzygium caryophyllaeum Gaertn.

= Syzygium caryophyllatum =

Species of tree

Syzygium caryophyllatum is a species of plant in the family Myrtaceae. It is a tree native to Sri Lanka and southern India.

It grows in areas from sea level to elevations of 1,160 m (3,810 ft). In India it is found in the states of Kerala, Karnataka, Goa and Tamil Nadu. The fruit is edible.

The local name in Karnataka is Kuntala/Kuntu Nerale.
