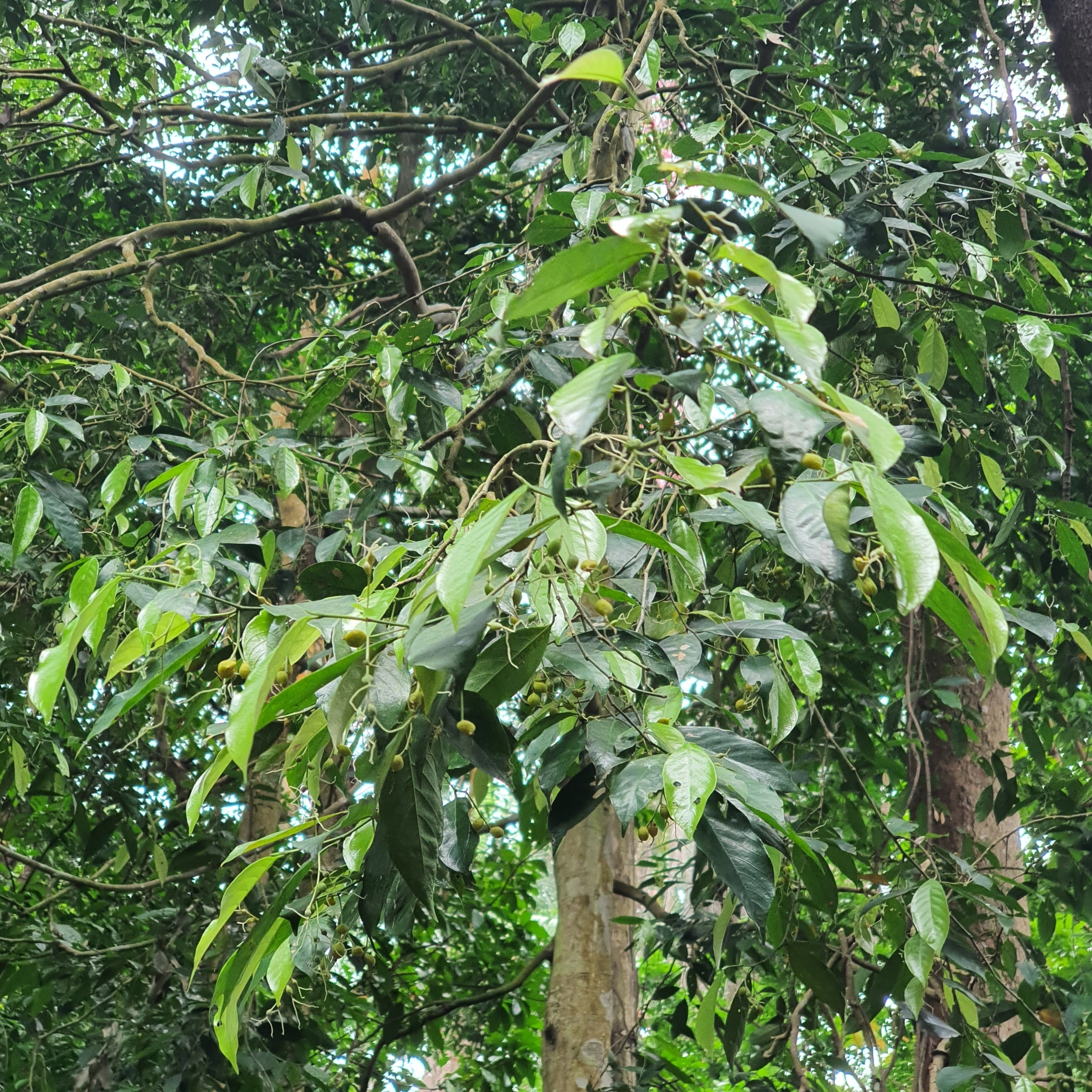
- In Singapore

Scientific classification
- Kingdom: Plantae
- Clade: Tracheophytes
- Clade: Angiosperms
- Clade: Eudicots
- Clade: Rosids
- Order: Rosales
- Family: Cannabaceae
- Genus: Gironniera
- Species: G. parvifolia

Binomial name
- Gironniera parvifolia Planch.

Synonyms
- Gironniera paucinervia Merr.; Gironniera scabrida (Thwaites) Alston; Gironniera zeylanica Gand.; Helminthospermum scabridum Thwaites

= Gironniera parvifolia =

Species of tree

Gironniera parvifolia is a tree in the family Cannabaceae. It is native to Southeast Asia and Sri Lanka.
