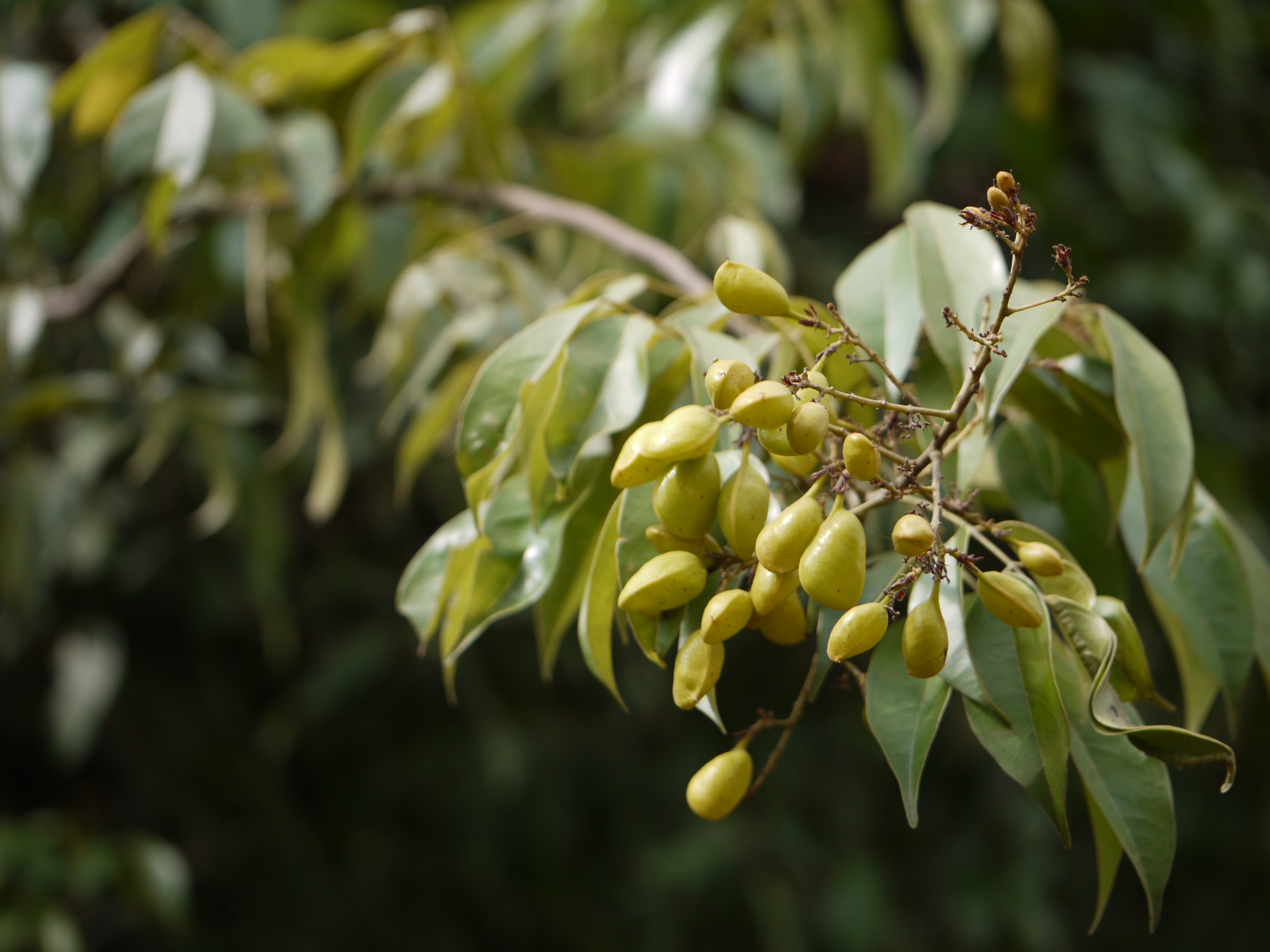

Scientific classification
- Kingdom: Plantae
- Clade: Tracheophytes
- Clade: Angiosperms
- Clade: Eudicots
- Clade: Rosids
- Order: Oxalidales
- Family: Connaraceae
- Genus: Connarus
- Species: C. monocarpus

Binomial name
- Connarus monocarpus L.

Synonyms
- Omphalobium indicum Gaertn. (Unresolved); Omphalobium pictum Blanco (Unresolved); Omphalobium pinnatum DC. (Unresolved); Rhus radaelijawel Mill.

= Connarus monocarpus =

Species of flowering plant

Connarus monocarpus (Indian zebrawood) (රදලිය) is a species of plant in the family Connaraceae. It is native to peninsular Peninsular India and Sri Lanka.
