= Syzygium umbrosum =

Conservation status
- Endangered (IUCN 2.3)

Scientific classification
- Kingdom: Plantae
- Clade: Tracheophytes
- Clade: Angiosperms
- Clade: Eudicots
- Clade: Rosids
- Order: Myrtales
- Family: Myrtaceae
- Genus: Syzygium
- Species: S. umbrosum

Binomial name
- Syzygium umbrosum Thwaites

Synonyms
- Eugenia subavenis Duthie; Eugenia umbrosa Bedd., nom. illeg. homonym. post.

Species of flowering plant

Syzygium umbrosum is a species of flowering plant in the family Myrtaceae. It is a tree endemic to Sri Lanka.
