= Syzygium revolutum =

Scientific classification
- Kingdom: Plantae
- Clade: Tracheophytes
- Clade: Angiosperms
- Clade: Eudicots
- Clade: Rosids
- Order: Myrtales
- Family: Myrtaceae
- Genus: Syzygium
- Species: S. revolutum

Binomial name
- Syzygium revolutum (Wight) Walp. (1843)

Synonyms
- Eugenia revoluta Wight (1842)

Species of flowering plant

Syzygium revolutum is a species of plant in the family Myrtaceae. It is native to Sri Lanka and southern India.

Two subspecies are recognized:

- Syzygium revolutum subsp. cyclophyllum (Alston) P.S.Ashton (synonyms Eugenia cyclophylla Thwaites ex Duthie (1878), nom. illeg. and Syzygium cyclophyllum Alston (1931)) – Sri Lanka
- Syzygium revolutum subsp. revolutum – southern India and Sri Lanka
