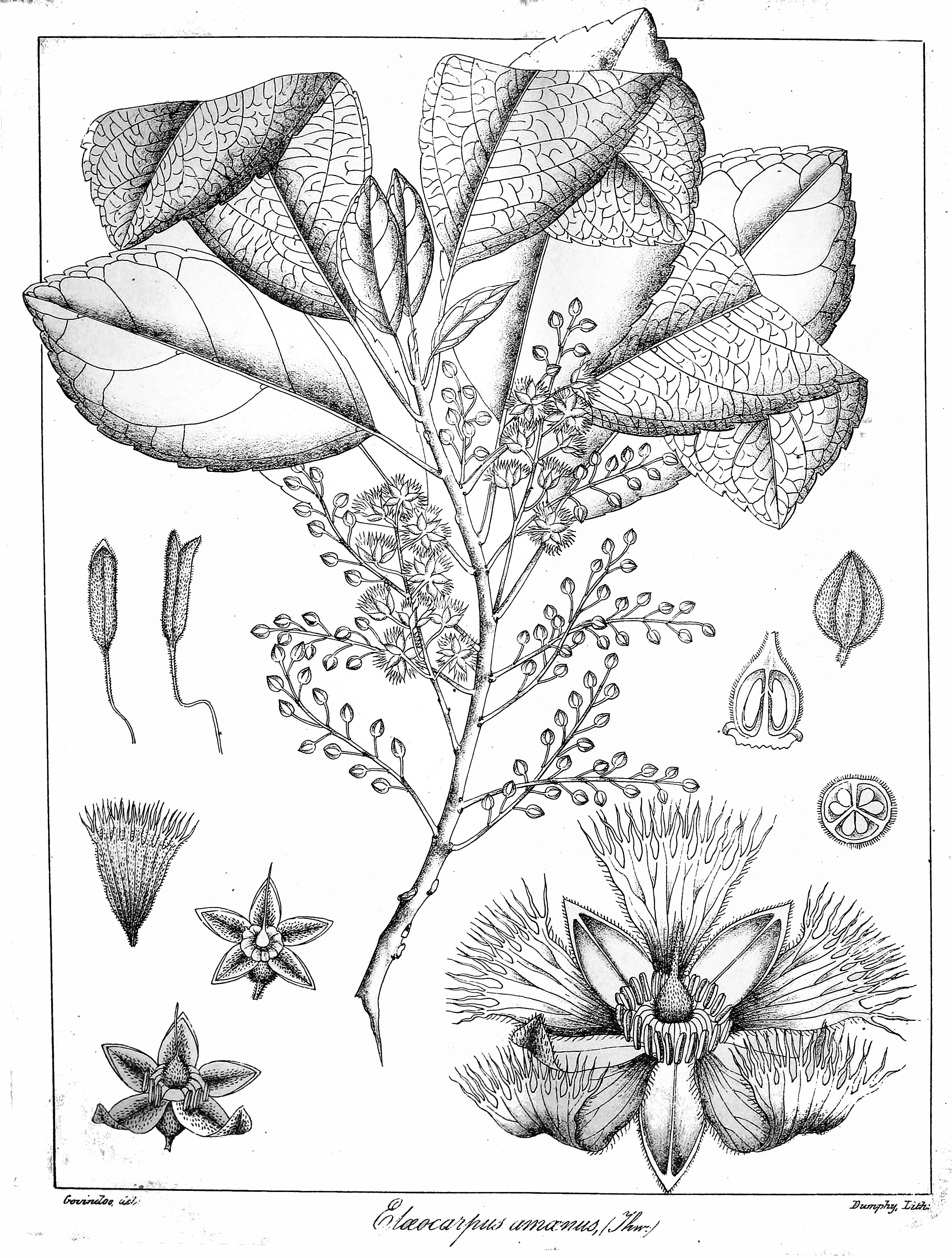

Scientific classification
- Kingdom: Plantae
- Clade: Tracheophytes
- Clade: Angiosperms
- Clade: Eudicots
- Clade: Rosids
- Order: Oxalidales
- Family: Elaeocarpaceae
- Genus: Elaeocarpus
- Species: E. amoenus

Binomial name
- Elaeocarpus amoenus Thwaites

= Elaeocarpus amoenus =

Species of flowering plant endemic to Sri Lanka

Elaeocarpus amoenus is a species of flowering plant in the Elaeocarpaceae family used as a medicinal plant. It is endemic to Sri Lanka, where it is called thiththa weralu (තිත්ත වෙරළු) in Sinhalese.

== See also ==
- List of Elaeocarpus species
