= List of nitrogen-fixing-clade families =

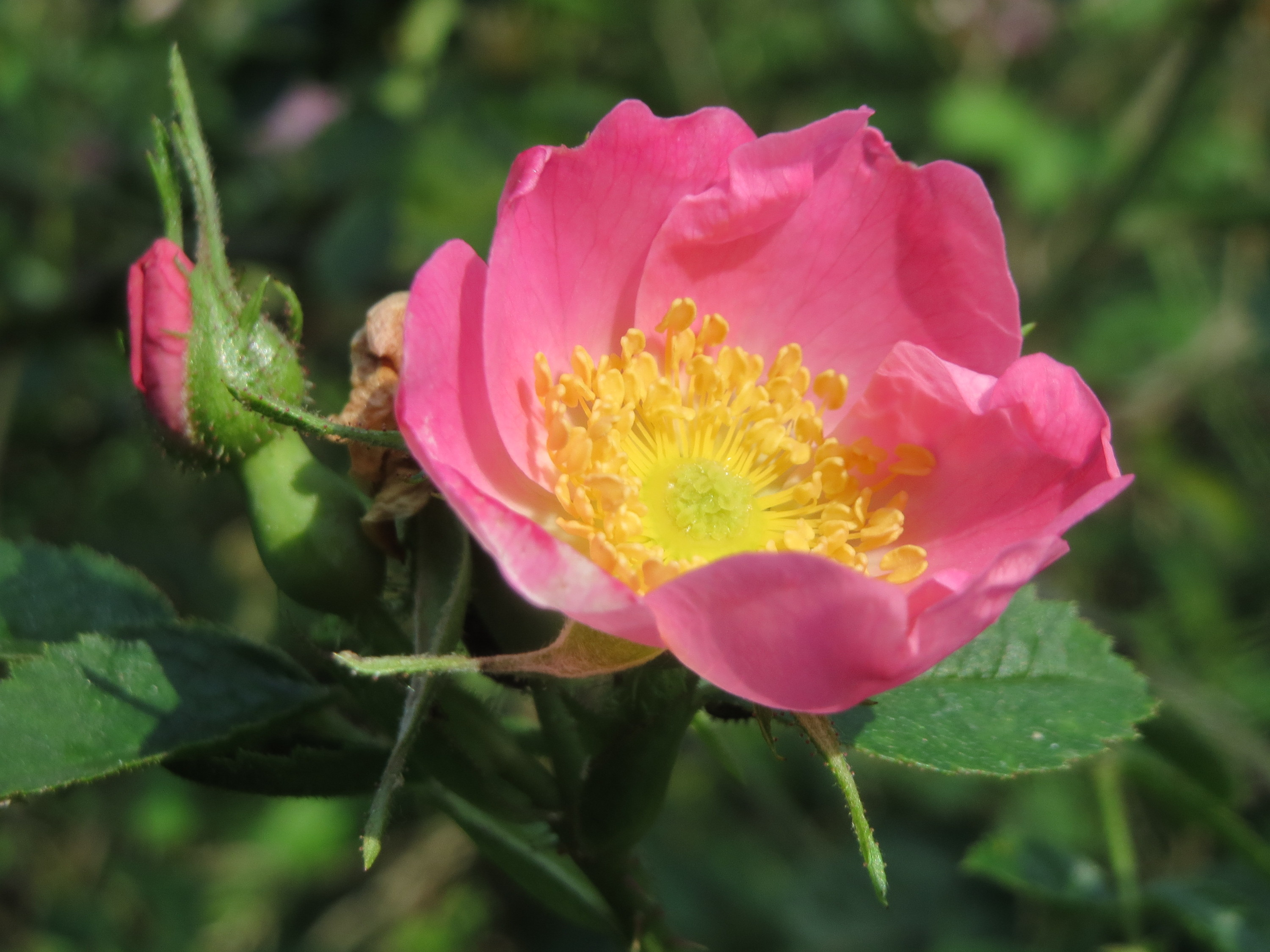
Rosa rubiginosa

The nitrogen-fixing clade consists of four orders of flowering plants: Cucurbitales, Fabales, Fagales and Rosales. (Note: The taxonomy (classification) in this list follows Plants of the World (2017) and the fourth Angiosperm Phylogeny Group system. Total counts of genera for each family come from Plants of the World Online (POWO). (See the POWO license.) Extinct taxa are not included. A clade of flowering plants is a subgroup consisting of all the descendants of a theoretical ancient ancestor.) This subgroup of the rosids encompasses 28 families of trees, shrubs, vines and herbaceous perennials and annuals. The roots of many of the species host bacteria that fix nitrogen into compounds the plants can use.

The trees of this subgroup dominate many temperate forests. Cannabis, with the psychoactive drug tetrahydrocannabinol (THC), has been used recreationally and ceremonially for at least 2400 years, but was in cultivation at least 6000 years before that for its oils and for making fabric and rope. Cucumbers, melons and watermelons are cultivated around the globe. The Mediterranean diet around 6000 years ago included fava beans, lentils, chickpeas and other legumes. Chestnuts were spread throughout Europe by the ancient Romans. The apple (in the rose family) is the second-most-cultivated sweet fruit, after the grape (in the order Vitales, not in this clade).

== Glossary ==
From the glossary of botanical terms:

- annual: a plant species that completes its life cycle within a single year or growing season
- basal: attached close to the base (of a plant or an evolutionary tree diagram)
- climber: a vine that leans on, twines around or clings to other plants for vertical support
- deciduous: falling seasonally, as with bark, leaves or petals
- herbaceous: not woody; usually green and soft in texture
- perennial: not an annual or biennial
- succulent (adjective): juicy or fleshy
- unisexual: of one sex; bearing only male or only female reproductive organs
- woody: hard and lignified; not herbaceous

Fabales is basal within the nitrogen-fixing clade. This clade, the COM clade and the order Zygophyllales constitute the fabids under the fourth Angiosperm Phylogeny Group (APG IV) system. (Note: APG IV does not assign a name to the nitrogen-fixing clade.)

== Families ==
Families
Family and a common name (Note: Each family's formal name ends in the Latin suffix -aceae and is derived from the name of a genus that is or once was part of the family.)	Type genus and etymology (Note: Some plants were named for naturalists (unless otherwise noted).)	Total genera; global distribution	Description and uses	Order	Type genus images
Anisophylleaceae (leechwood family)	Anisophyllea, from Greek for "unequal leaves"	4 genera, mainly in the tropics	Shrubs and trees with unisexual flowers. Anisophyllea griffithii is sometimes harvested for timber.	Cucurbitales	Anisophyllea disticha
Apodanthaceae (stemsucker family)	Apodanthes, from Greek for "stalkless flowers"	2 genera, scattered worldwide	Parasitic plants lacking chlorophyll. Typically, only the flowers are visible on the host's bark.	Cucurbitales	Apodanthes caseariae
Barbeyaceae (elm-olive family)	Barbeya, for William Barbey (1842–1914)	1 genus, in forested slopes on either side of the Gulf of Aden	Unisexual trees	Rosales	—
Begoniaceae (begonia family)	Begonia, for Michel Bégon (1638–1710), a French official and plant collector	2 genera, mainly throughout the tropics, extending into the subtropics	Mostly perennial herbaceous succulents with unisexual flowers, with a few subshrubs and herbaceous plants up to 4 m (13 ft) tall. Some species grow on rocks, some on other plants. Many species are popular potted-plant ornamentals.	Cucurbitales	Begonia obliqua
Betulaceae (birch family)	Betula, from a Latin plant name	6 genera, in the Northern Hemisphere and parts of South America and Southeast Asia	Deciduous shrubs and trees with unisexual flowers and loose bark, usually with lenticels, horizontal ruptures that allow gas exchange. The wood of birch and alder is used to make furniture and musical instruments.	Fagales	Betula pendula
Cannabaceae (hemp family)	Cannabis, from a Latin plant name	9 genera, scattered worldwide	Shrubs, trees, vines and herbaceous plants with thin sap. Beer hops have been in cultivation since the 1200s.	Rosales	Cannabis sativa
Casuarinaceae (she-oak family)	Casuarina, from a Malaysian word for cassowary	4 genera, in parts of Oceania, Southeast Asia and Madagascar	Evergreen trees and shrubs, unisexual or with unisexual flowers, with green branchlets and reduced leaves. Casuarina equisetifolia is planted to anchor beach sand.	Fagales	Casuarina equisetifolia
Coriariaceae (tanner-bush family)	Coriaria, from Latin for "leather"	1 genus, scattered worldwide	Shrubs and slightly woody herbaceous plants with nitrogen-fixing roots. The fruits are used for dyes. Most species are poisonous.	Cucurbitales	Coriaria myrtifolia
Corynocarpaceae (cribwood family)	Corynocarpus, from Greek for "club fruit"	1 genus, mostly in the southwestern Pacific	Evergreen trees and big shrubs. The trees have been used to construct canoes.	Cucurbitales	Corynocarpus laevigatus
Cucurbitaceae (cucumber family)	Cucurbita, from a Latin plant name	101 genera, worldwide, especially in the tropics	Herbaceous and woody perennials, mostly vines. Butternut squash was domesticated in the Peruvian Andes over 9000 years ago. Cucumbers were cultivated in ancient Ur.	Cucurbitales	Cucurbita pepo
Datiscaceae (durango-root family)	Datisca, from a Latin plant name	1 genus, in central and southwest Asia, in and near California, and around the Mediterranean	Mostly unisexual herbaceous perennials with nitrogen-fixing bacteria. D. cannabina has been used as a dye in Asia.	Cucurbitales	Datisca cannabina
Dirachmaceae (rachman family)	Dirachma, from a Socotran plant name, possibly	1 genus, in Socotra and Somalia	Trees and shrubs	Rosales	Dirachma socotrana
Elaeagnaceae (oleaster family)	Elaeagnus, from a Greek plant name	3 genera, mostly in the Northern Hemisphere, Southeast Asia and Queensland, Australia	Small trees and shrubs. Several species of Elaeagnus are cultivated as ornamentals. Hippophae rhamnoides has been used in jams and juices for centuries. The roots are generally nitrogen-fixing.	Rosales	Elaeagnus angustifolia
Fabaceae (pea family)	Vicia. Faba, an earlier synonym, is from a Latin plant name.	780 genera, scattered worldwide	Also known as legumes. Trees, shrubs, vines and herbaceous plants. The roots are generally nitrogen-fixing. Staple foods include soybeans, peanuts, peas and various beans. Some species provide valuable gums, soaps and perfumes.	Fabales	Vicia cracca
Fagaceae (beech family)	Fagus, from a Latin plant name	8 genera, scattered in the tropics and the temperate Northern Hemisphere	Mainly trees with unisexual flowers. Edible chestnuts have been cultivated for thousands of years. Cork is harvested mainly from the cork oak. Wood from beech and oak trees is used in construction and carpentry.	Fagales	Fagus sylvatica
Juglandaceae (walnut family)	Juglans, from a Latin plant name	9 genera, mostly in parts of the Americas, Asia and Oceania.	Shrubs and trees, mostly with unisexual flowers. Trees with edible nuts include walnuts and pecans.	Fagales	Juglans regia
Moraceae (mulberry family)	Morus, from a Latin plant name	48 genera, scattered worldwide	Shrubs, trees, climbers and herbaceous perennials, frequently with whitish sap. Some grow on other plants. The common fig was most likely already in cultivation more than 11,000 years ago. Breadfruit is a food crop in parts of Asia and the Pacific.	Rosales	Morus nigra
Myricaceae (bayberry family)	Myrica, from a Greek plant name	3 genera, scattered worldwide	Evergreen shrubs and small trees, unisexual or with unisexual flowers. The roots are usually nitrogen-fixing. Chinese bayberry is grown commercially in China for its fruit.	Fagales	Myrica gale
Nothofagaceae (roble family)	Nothofagus, from Greek for "false", plus Fagus	1 genus, in Oceania and southern South America	Shrubs and trees with unisexual flowers. The timber is used in carpentry.	Fagales	Nothofagus antarctica
Polygalaceae (milkwort family)	Polygala, from Greek and Latin plant names	30 genera, scattered widely, except in polar regions	Herbaceous plants, vines, shrubs and trees, some up to 50 m (160 ft) tall.	Fabales	Polygala vulgaris
Quillajaceae (soapbark-tree family)	Quillaja, from a Chilean plant name	1 genus, in warmer regions of temperate South America	Evergreen trees with leathery leaves and foamy saponins in their bark	Fabales	Quillaja saponaria
Rhamnaceae (buckthorn family)	Rhamnus, from Greek and Latin plant names	63 genera, worldwide	Deciduous shrubs and trees, for the most part. Ziziphus jujuba and Z. mauritiana, similar to dates, are commercially grown.	Rosales	Rhamnus cathartica
Rosaceae (rose family)	Rosa, from a Latin plant name	110 genera, worldwide	Trees, shrubs and herbaceous plants, frequently with spiny branches. The genus Rubus includes raspberries and blackberries. Prunus includes plums, peaches, cherries and almonds; domesticated almonds are found in Bronze Age archaeological sites in the Eastern Mediterranean.	Rosales	Rosa majalis
Surianaceae (bay-cedar family)	Suriana, for Joseph Donat Surian (1650–1691), a French doctor, chemist and botanist	5 genera, scattered worldwide in tropical, subtropical and warm-temperate zones	Shrubs and trees	Fabales	Suriana maritima
Tetramelaceae (false hemp-tree family)	Tetrameles, from Greek for "four-part" (sepals)	2 genera, in parts of Oceania and South and Southeast Asia	Tall unisexual trees with soft wood	Cucurbitales	Tetrameles nudiflora
Ticodendraceae (tico-tree family)	Ticodendron, from Tico plus Greek for "tree"	1 genus, in Central America and Mexico	Just one species of unisexual evergreen trees	Fagales	Ticodendron incognitum
Ulmaceae (elm family)	Ulmus, from a Latin plant name	7 genera, mainly in the temperate Northern Hemisphere	Trees and shrubs with thin sap. Dutch elm disease killed almost all of the elms in North America and Europe in the 20th century. Disease-resistant elms have been difficult to propagate.	Rosales	Ulmus glabra
Urticaceae (nettle family)	Urtica, from a Latin plant name	60 genera, worldwide	Shrubs, trees, woody vines and herbaceous plants, some growing on other plants, and some with stinging hairs. Ramie (Boehmeria nivea) is grown in East Asia for its long, strong fibrous stalks.	Rosales	Urtica dioica

== See also ==
- List of plant family names with etymologies
