= Anisophyllea penninervata =

Scientific classification
- Kingdom: Plantae
- Clade: Tracheophytes
- Clade: Angiosperms
- Clade: Eudicots
- Clade: Rosids
- Order: Cucurbitales
- Family: Anisophylleaceae
- Genus: Anisophyllea
- Species: A. penninervata

Binomial name
- Anisophyllea penninervata J. E. Vidal

Species of tree

Anisophyllea penninervata is a tree species in the family Anisophylleaceae, with no subspecies listed in the Catalogue of Life. It has only been recorded from southern Vietnam where it may be called bất đẳng diệp.
