= Anisophyllea globosa =

Conservation status
- Critically Endangered (IUCN 3.1)

Scientific classification
- Kingdom: Plantae
- Clade: Tracheophytes
- Clade: Angiosperms
- Clade: Eudicots
- Clade: Rosids
- Order: Cucurbitales
- Family: Anisophylleaceae
- Genus: Anisophyllea
- Species: A. globosa

Binomial name
- Anisophyllea globosa Madani

Species of tree

Anisophyllea globosa is a tree of Borneo in the family Anisophylleaceae. The specific epithet globosa is from the Latin meaning "round", referring to the fruits.

== Description ==
Anisophyllea globosa grows as a small tree up to 10 metres (30 ft) tall with a trunk diameter of up to 10 cm (4 in). The bark is smooth. The round fruits measure up to 5.5 cm (2 in) in diameter.

== Distribution and habitat ==
Anisophyllea globosa is endemic to Borneo, where it is likely confined to Sabah. Its habitat is lowland secondary vegetation at around 50 m (200 ft) elevation.
