= Anisophyllea impressinervia =

Conservation status
- Critically Endangered (IUCN 3.1)

Scientific classification
- Kingdom: Plantae
- Clade: Tracheophytes
- Clade: Angiosperms
- Clade: Eudicots
- Clade: Rosids
- Order: Cucurbitales
- Family: Anisophylleaceae
- Genus: Anisophyllea
- Species: A. impressinervia

Binomial name
- Anisophyllea impressinervia Madani

Species of tree

Anisophyllea impressinervia is a tree of Borneo in the family Anisophylleaceae. The specific epithet impressinervia is from the Latin meaning "sunken veins", referring to the leaf veins.

== Description ==
Anisophyllea impressinervia grows as a tree up to 26 metres (90 ft) tall with a trunk diameter of up to 30 cm (12 in). The bark is cracking to flaky. The roundish fruits measure up to 5 cm (2 in) in diameter.

== Distribution and habitat ==
Anisophyllea impressinervia is endemic to Borneo, where it is possibly confined to Sabah. Its habitat is lowland secondary forests at around 30 m (100 ft) elevation.
