= Anisophyllea apetala =

Conservation status
- Vulnerable (IUCN 2.3)

Scientific classification
- Kingdom: Plantae
- Clade: Tracheophytes
- Clade: Angiosperms
- Clade: Eudicots
- Clade: Rosids
- Order: Cucurbitales
- Family: Anisophylleaceae
- Genus: Anisophyllea
- Species: A. apetala

Binomial name
- Anisophyllea apetala Scort. ex King

Species of tree

Anisophyllea apetala is a species of flowering plant in the family Anisophylleaceae. It is a tree endemic to Peninsular Malaysia. It is threatened by habitat loss.
