= Anisophyllea corneri =

Conservation status
- Least Concern (IUCN 2.3)

Scientific classification
- Kingdom: Plantae
- Clade: Tracheophytes
- Clade: Angiosperms
- Clade: Eudicots
- Clade: Rosids
- Order: Cucurbitales
- Family: Anisophylleaceae
- Genus: Anisophyllea
- Species: A. corneri

Binomial name
- Anisophyllea corneri Ding Hou

Species of tree

Anisophyllea corneri is a tree of tropical Asia in the family Anisophylleaceae. It is named for the English botanist Edred John Henry Corner.

== Description ==
Anisophyllea corneri grows as a tree up to 30 metres (100 ft) tall with a trunk diameter of up to 55 cm (20 in). Its bark is smooth. The ellipsoid fruits measure up to 13.5 cm (5 in) long.

== Distribution and habitat ==
Anisophyllea corneri grows naturally in Peninsular Malaysia and Borneo. Its habitat is lowland mixed dipterocarp to submontane forests from sea-level to 1,200 m (4,000 ft) altitude.
