= Anisophyllea manausensis =

Scientific classification
- Kingdom: Plantae
- Clade: Tracheophytes
- Clade: Angiosperms
- Clade: Eudicots
- Clade: Rosids
- Order: Cucurbitales
- Family: Anisophylleaceae
- Genus: Anisophyllea
- Species: A. manausensis

Binomial name
- Anisophyllea manausensis Pires & W.A.Rodrigues

Species of plant

Anisophyllea manausensis is a species of plant in the Anisophylleaceae family. It is native to Peru, Colombia and Brazil. João Murça Pires and William Antônio Rodrigues the Brazilian botanists who first formally described the species, named it in after Manaus, where the specimen they examined was collected.

== Description ==
It is a tree reaching 10–25 meters in height. Its leaves are in alternate positions on the stems and lack distinct petioles. The thin but leathery leaves are 9-17 by 4.5-7.5 centimeters. Their upper and lower surfaces are different colored, with the upper surface becoming black when dry. The leaves come to a tapering point at their tip. The leaves have 3-4 pairs of secondary veins emanating from their midribs. Its inflorescences are axillary and arranged as modestly branching, rigid panicles that are 12 centimeters long and covered in very small, fine hairs. Its flowers are unisexual. Male flowers are small, solitary and lack a distinct pedicel. The male flowers are subtended by bracts that are 0.5-1.0 mm long. Male flowers have 4 oval sepals, covered in fine hair, that are 1.35 by 1 millimeters. Male flowers have 4 petals that are 5 by 0.3 millimeters. The apical half of the male petals is divided into linear fringes. The male flowers have 8 stamens with 0.7-1 millimeter long filaments and 0.33 millimeter long anthers. Its smooth, leathery, black fruit are 3.5-4 by 2.5-3 centimeter drupes with one seed. Its thin-shelled seeds are 1.5-2 by 2 centimeters.

=== Distribution and habitat ===
It grows in solid soil or sandy-clay soil.

=== Reproductive biology ===
The pollen of Anisophyllea manausensis is shed as permanent tetrads.
