= Anisophyllea ferruginea =

Conservation status
- Vulnerable (IUCN 2.3)

Scientific classification
- Kingdom: Plantae
- Clade: Tracheophytes
- Clade: Angiosperms
- Clade: Eudicots
- Clade: Rosids
- Order: Cucurbitales
- Family: Anisophylleaceae
- Genus: Anisophyllea
- Species: A. ferruginea

Binomial name
- Anisophyllea ferruginea Ding Hou

Species of tree

Anisophyllea ferruginea is a tree of Borneo in the family Anisophylleaceae. The specific epithet ferruginea is from the Latin meaning "rust-coloured", referring to the leaf hairs.

== Description ==
Anisophyllea ferruginea grows as a tree up to 30 metres (100 ft) tall with a trunk diameter of up to 40 cm (16 in). The bark is smooth to cracking or fissured. The ellipsoid fruits measure up to 8 cm (3 in) long.

== Distribution and habitat ==
Anisophyllea ferruginea is endemic to Borneo. Its habitat is mixed dipterocarp forest from sea-level to 600 m (2,000 ft) altitude.
