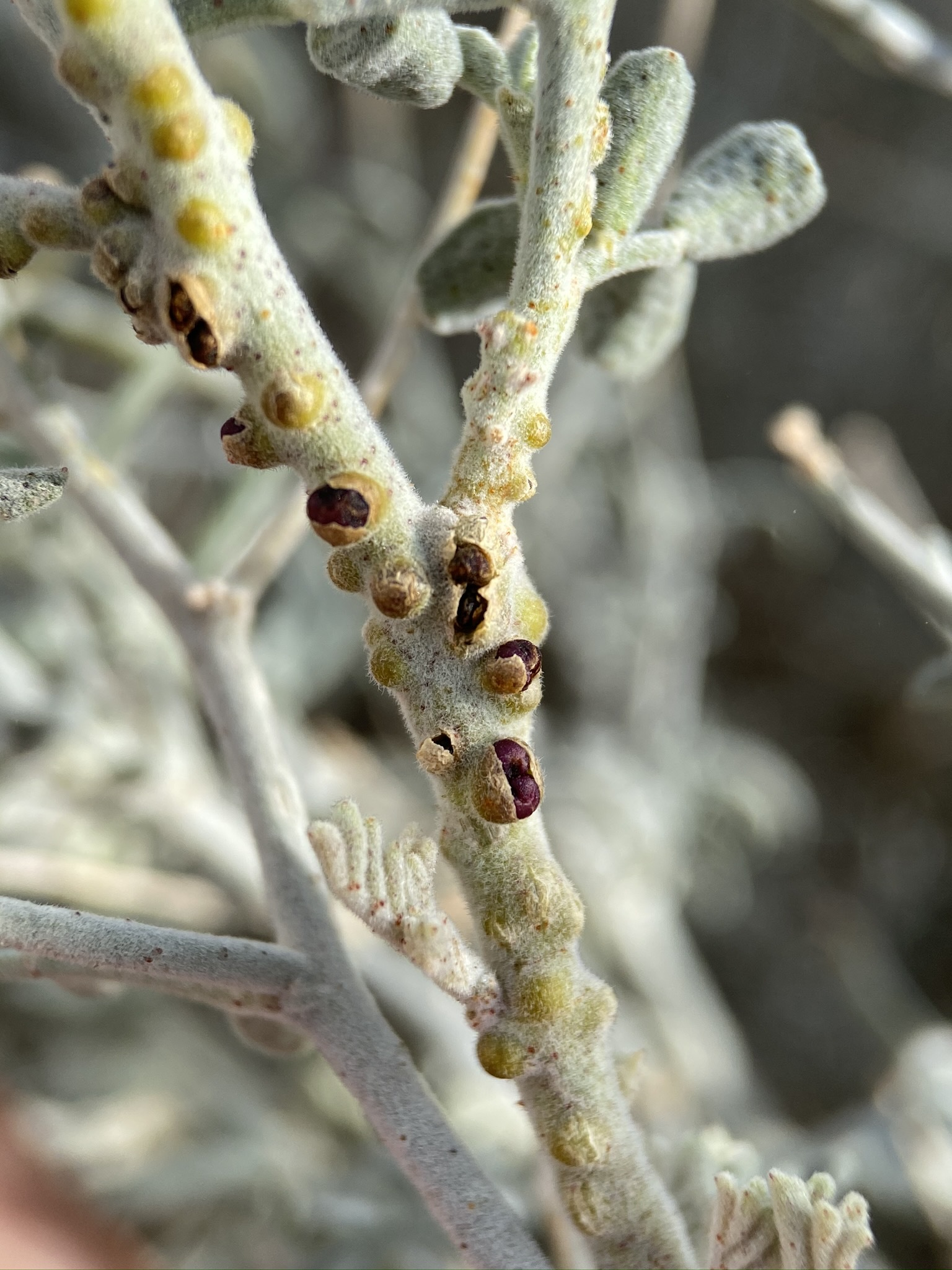
- The flowers erupting from the stem of another plant

Scientific classification
- Kingdom: Plantae
- Clade: Tracheophytes
- Clade: Angiosperms
- Clade: Eudicots
- Clade: Rosids
- Order: Cucurbitales
- Family: Apodanthaceae
- Genus: Pilostyles
- Species: P. thurberi

Binomial name
- Pilostyles thurberi A.Gray

= Pilostyles thurberi =

Species of flowering plant

Pilostyles thurberi is a species of endoparasitic flowering plant known by the common names Thurber's stemsucker and Thurber's pilostyles. It is native to the southwestern United States and northern Mexico, where it grows in desert and woodland. In the United States, P. thurberi has been recorded from the states of Arizona, California, New Mexico, Nevada, and Texas.

== Description ==
It is a tiny parasitic plant, only a few millimeters long, which lives in the stem tissues of its host plants, species of legume shrubs, often of genus Psorothamnus, especially Emory's indigo bush or dyebush (Psorothamnus emoryi). It has no roots, leaves, or chlorophyll, obtaining its water and nutrients from the host. It grows as microscopic strands similar to fungal filaments completely within the stems of its host, until when it blooms, sending tiny flowers through the surface of the host plant.

It is a dioecious species, with male and female individuals producing one type of flower each. Both types are brown or maroon and no more than 2 millimeters across, appearing as specks on the stem of the host plant. The bloom usually occurs in January, but sometimes as early as November. The female flower swells slightly as the fruit capsule develops within, and each may hold over 100 seeds, which are minute.

=== Taxonomy ===
The plant was named by the botanist Asa Gray in honor of George Thurber, another botanist who once worked for the United States and Mexican Boundary Survey.

== Distribution and habitat ==
This species is found in both the United States and Mexico. It has been recorded from the states of Arizona, California, New Mexico, Nevada, Texas in the United States. In Mexico, this species is found in the state of Baja California, ranging from Mexicali to San Felipe, and in the states of Sonora and Chihuahua. It occurs primarily in open desert scrub, from 100 to 1000 meters in elevation.
