= Anisophyllea rhomboidea =

Conservation status
- Vulnerable (IUCN 2.3)

Scientific classification
- Kingdom: Plantae
- Clade: Tracheophytes
- Clade: Angiosperms
- Clade: Eudicots
- Clade: Rosids
- Order: Cucurbitales
- Family: Anisophylleaceae
- Genus: Anisophyllea
- Species: A. rhomboidea

Binomial name
- Anisophyllea rhomboidea Baill.

Species of flowering plant

Anisophyllea rhomboidea is a species of plant in the Anisophylleaceae family. It is found in Indonesia and Malaysia.
