= Anisophyllea grandis =

Conservation status
- Vulnerable (IUCN 2.3)

Scientific classification
- Kingdom: Plantae
- Clade: Tracheophytes
- Clade: Angiosperms
- Clade: Eudicots
- Clade: Rosids
- Order: Cucurbitales
- Family: Anisophylleaceae
- Genus: Anisophyllea
- Species: A. grandis

Binomial name
- Anisophyllea grandis (Benth.) Burkill

Species of tree

Anisophyllea grandis is a species of plant in the Anisophylleaceae family. It is a tree endemic to Peninsular Malaysia. It is threatened by habitat loss.
