= Anisophyllea chartacea =

Conservation status
- Vulnerable (IUCN 2.3)

Scientific classification
- Kingdom: Plantae
- Clade: Tracheophytes
- Clade: Angiosperms
- Clade: Eudicots
- Clade: Rosids
- Order: Cucurbitales
- Family: Anisophylleaceae
- Genus: Anisophyllea
- Species: A. chartacea

Binomial name
- Anisophyllea chartacea Madani

Species of tree

Anisophyllea chartacea is a tree of Borneo in the family Anisophylleaceae. The specific epithet chartacea is from the Latin meaning "papery", referring to the leaves.

== Description ==
Anisophyllea chartacea grows as a tree up to 33 metres (110 ft) tall with a trunk diameter of up to 80 cm (30 in). The leaves are chartaceous.

== Distribution and habitat ==
Anisophyllea chartacea is endemic to Borneo where it is confined to Sarawak. Its habitat is lowland mixed dipterocarp forest.
