= Anisophyllea curtisii =

Conservation status
- Vulnerable (IUCN 2.3)

Scientific classification
- Kingdom: Plantae
- Clade: Tracheophytes
- Clade: Angiosperms
- Clade: Eudicots
- Clade: Rosids
- Order: Cucurbitales
- Family: Anisophylleaceae
- Genus: Anisophyllea
- Species: A. curtisii

Binomial name
- Anisophyllea curtisii King

Species of flowering plant

Anisophyllea curtisii is a species of flowering plant in the family Anisophylleaceae. It is endemic to Peninsular Malaysia. It is threatened by habitat loss.
