= Anisophyllea reticulata =

Conservation status
- Vulnerable (IUCN 2.3)

Scientific classification
- Kingdom: Plantae
- Clade: Tracheophytes
- Clade: Angiosperms
- Clade: Eudicots
- Clade: Rosids
- Order: Cucurbitales
- Family: Anisophylleaceae
- Genus: Anisophyllea
- Species: A. reticulata

Binomial name
- Anisophyllea reticulata Kochummen

Species of flowering plant

Anisophyllea reticulata is a species of plant in the Anisophylleaceae family. It is endemic to Peninsular Malaysia.
