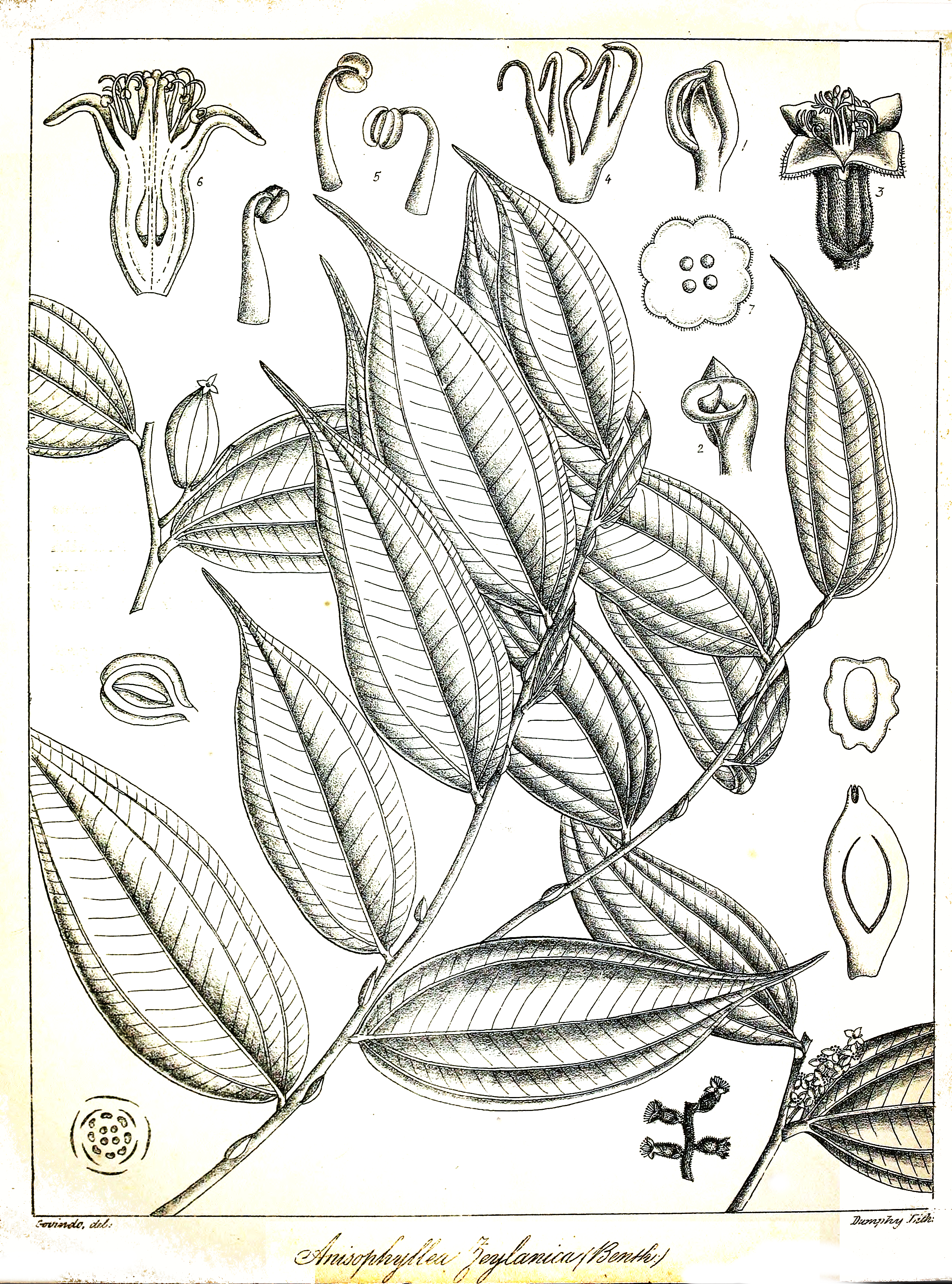

Conservation status
- Vulnerable (IUCN 2.3)

Scientific classification
- Kingdom: Plantae
- Clade: Tracheophytes
- Clade: Angiosperms
- Clade: Eudicots
- Clade: Rosids
- Order: Cucurbitales
- Family: Anisophylleaceae
- Genus: Anisophyllea
- Species: A. cinnamomoides

Binomial name
- Anisophyllea cinnamomoides (Gardner & Champ.) Alston

= Anisophyllea cinnamomoides =

Species of flowering plant

Anisophyllea cinnamomoides is a species of plant in the family Anisophylleaceae. It is endemic to Sri Lanka.

== Culture ==
Known as "වැලි පියන්න - weli piyanna" in Sinhala.
