= Anisophyllea beccariana =

Conservation status
- Least Concern (IUCN 2.3)

Scientific classification
- Kingdom: Plantae
- Clade: Tracheophytes
- Clade: Angiosperms
- Clade: Eudicots
- Clade: Rosids
- Order: Cucurbitales
- Family: Anisophylleaceae
- Genus: Anisophyllea
- Species: A. beccariana

Binomial name
- Anisophyllea beccariana Baill.

Species of tree

Anisophyllea beccariana is a tree of tropical Asia in the family Anisophylleaceae. It is named for the Italian botanist Odoardo Beccari.

== Description ==
Anisophyllea beccariana grows as a tree up to 25 metres (80 ft) tall. Its bark is flaky or scaly. The ellipsoid fruits measure up to 3 cm (1.2 in) long.

== Distribution and habitat ==
Anisophyllea beccariana grows naturally in Sumatra and Borneo. Its habitat is mixed dipterocarp and kerangas forests from sea-level to about 600 m (2,000 ft) altitude.
