= Polygonanthus =

Scientific classification
- Kingdom: Plantae
- Clade: Tracheophytes
- Clade: Angiosperms
- Clade: Eudicots
- Clade: Rosids
- Order: Cucurbitales
- Family: Anisophylleaceae
- Genus: Polygonanthus; Ducke

Species
- See text

Genus of Anisophylleaceae plants

Polygonanthus is a small genus of flowering plants in the family Anisophylleaceae, found in the Amazon. It has a Polygonum‑type embryo sac.

== Species ==
Currently accepted species include:

- Polygonanthus amazonicus Ducke
- Polygonanthus punctulatus Kuhlm.
