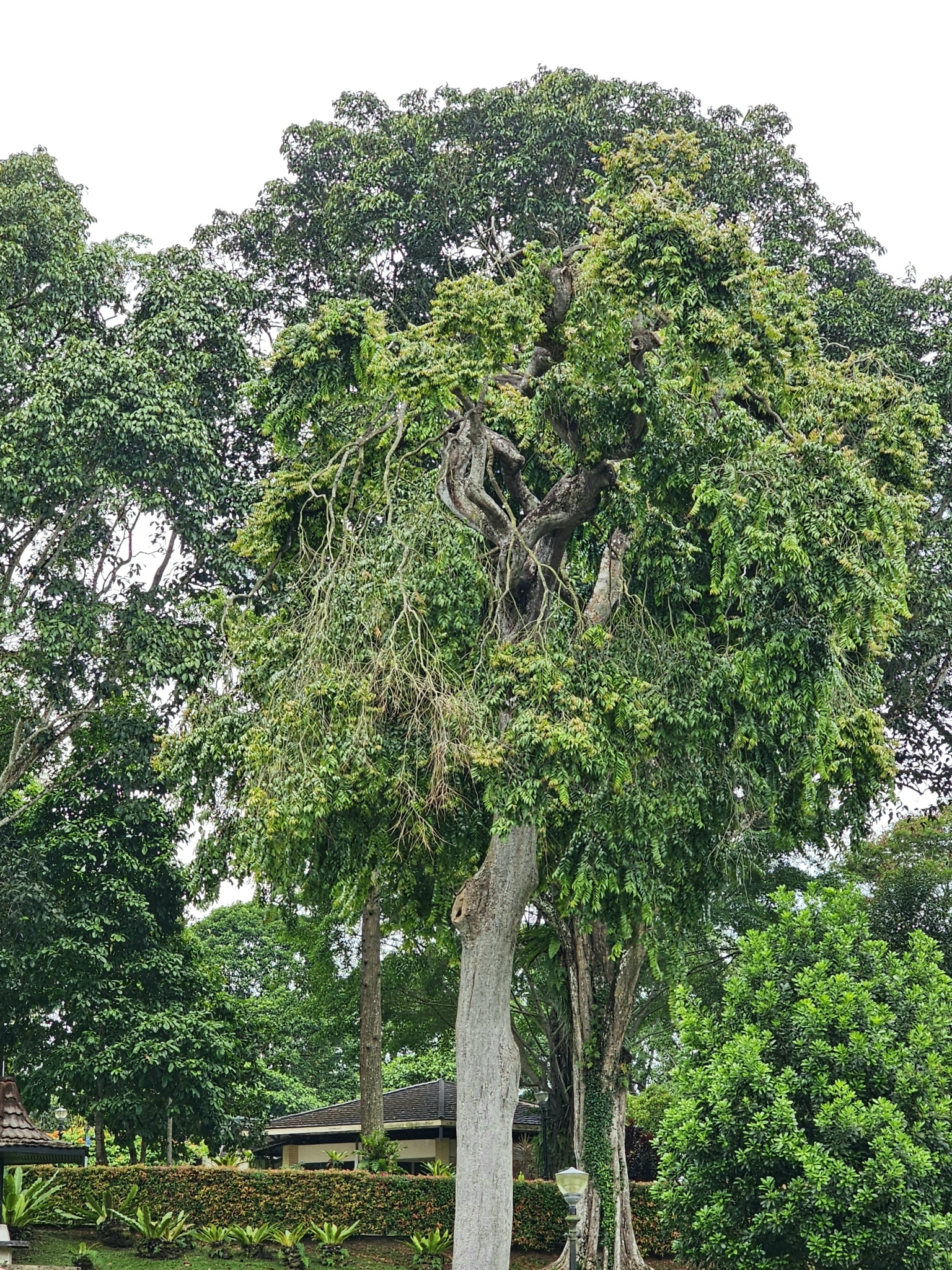
- In Singapore

Conservation status
- Near Threatened (IUCN 3.1)

Scientific classification
- Kingdom: Plantae
- Clade: Tracheophytes
- Clade: Angiosperms
- Clade: Eudicots
- Clade: Rosids
- Order: Cucurbitales
- Family: Anisophylleaceae
- Genus: Anisophyllea
- Species: A. griffithii

Binomial name
- Anisophyllea griffithii Oliv.

Synonyms
- Anisophyllea malayensis Li Bing Zhang, Xin Chen & H.He

= Anisophyllea griffithii =

Species of tree

Anisophyllea griffithii is a species of tree in the family Anisophylleaceae. It grows up to 36 metres (120 ft) tall. The species is native to Peninsular Malaysia, Singapore and Borneo.

== Conservation ==
Anisophyllea griffithii has been assessed as near threatened on the IUCN Red List. It is threatened by logging for its timber and by conversion of its habitat for agriculture and plantations.
