= A. nitida =

A. nitida may refer to:

- Agrochola nitida, a moth species found in most of Europe
- Anisophyllea nitida, a plant species
- Avicennia nitida, the black mangrove, a tree species
- Axinaea nitida, a plant species

== See also ==
- Nitida (disambiguation)
