= Combretocarpus =

Conservation status
- Least Concern (IUCN 3.1)

Scientific classification
- Kingdom: Plantae
- Clade: Tracheophytes
- Clade: Angiosperms
- Clade: Eudicots
- Clade: Rosids
- Order: Cucurbitales
- Family: Anisophylleaceae
- Genus: Combretocarpus; Hook.f.
- Species: C. rotundatus

Binomial name
- Combretocarpus rotundatus (Miq.) Danser

Synonyms
- Combretocarpus motleyi Hook.f.

Genus of trees

Combretocarpus is a monotypic genus of tree in the Anisophylleaceae family. The generic name combretocarpus is from the Greek, referring to the resemblance of its fruit to that of the genus Combretum. As of April 2014 The Plant List recognises the single species Combretocarpus rotundatus.

== Description ==
Combretocarpus rotundatus grows as a tree up to 40 metres (130 ft) tall with a trunk diameter of up to 1 metre (3 ft 3 in). The fissured bark is grey-brown to brown. The bisexual flowers are yellow. The fruits have three or four wings and measure up to 3 cm (1 in) long. The hard heavy wood is used in heavy construction and for indoor floors and panels.

== Distribution and habitat ==
Combretocarpus rotundatus grows naturally in Sumatra, Peninsular Malaysia and Borneo. Its habitat is swamp and kerangas forests.
