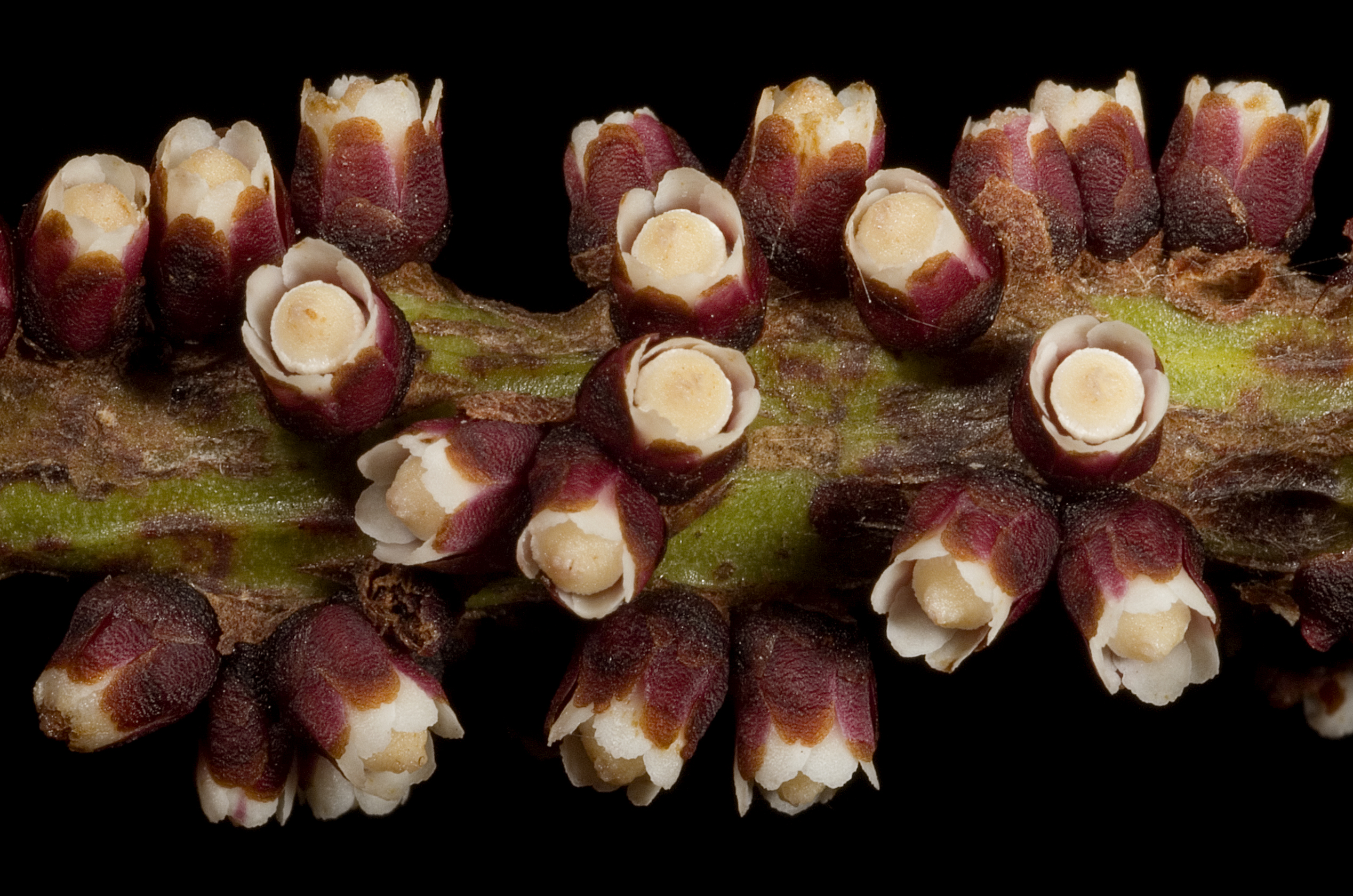
- A cluster of Pilostyles hamiltonii flowers growing out of a Daviesia stem

Scientific classification
- Kingdom: Plantae
- Clade: Tracheophytes
- Clade: Angiosperms
- Clade: Eudicots
- Clade: Rosids
- Order: Cucurbitales
- Family: Apodanthaceae
- Genus: Pilostyles; Guill.

Species
- See text

Synonyms
- Berlinianche (Harms) Vattimo-Gil

= Pilostyles =

Genus of flowering plants

Pilostyles is a genus of flowering plants in the family Apodanthaceae. It includes about 11 species of very small, completely parasitic plants that live inside the stems of woody legumes. Plants of this genus are sometimes referred to as stemsuckers.

The plants completely lack stems, roots, leaves, and chlorophyll. While not flowering, they do not resemble most plants, living entirely inside the host as " [...] a mycelium-like endophyte formed by strands of parenchyma cells that are in close contact to the host vasculature". Their presence is only noticeable when the flowers emerge out of the stems of the host plant.

Pilostyles is dioecious, with separate male and female plants. Male and female plants are not commonly known to inhabit the same host. Flowers are two or three millimeters wide and in some species each female flower can produce over 100 seeds, which are less than 1 mm (0.04 in) long. These seeds contain embryos composed of just eight cells, the smallest dicot embryo presently known.

Species are found in several countries, with a discontinuous distribution. Species have been found in most of South America and tropical Africa, and also in Australia, Iran, Iraq, Mexico, Syria, Turkey, and the United States.

Species include:

- Pilostyles aethiopica Welw.
- Pilostyles berteroi Guill.
- Pilostyles blanchetii (Gardner) R.Br.
- Pilostyles boyacensis F.Gonzáles & Pabón-Mora
- Pilostyles coccoidea K.R.Thiele
- Pilostyles collina Dell
- Pilostyles hamiltonii C.A.Gardner
- Pilostyles haussknechtii Boiss.
- Pilostyles maya P.Ortega, Gonz.-Martínez & S.Vásquez
- Pilostyles mexicana (Brandegee) Rose
- Pilostyles thurberi A.Gray

The genus was formerly considered a member of Rafflesiaceae, and was re-classified after new DNA evidence.
