= Anisophyllea disticha =

Conservation status
- Least Concern (IUCN 3.1)

Scientific classification
- Kingdom: Plantae
- Clade: Tracheophytes
- Clade: Angiosperms
- Clade: Eudicots
- Clade: Rosids
- Order: Cucurbitales
- Family: Anisophylleaceae
- Genus: Anisophyllea
- Species: A. disticha

Binomial name
- Anisophyllea disticha (Jack) Baill.

Synonyms
- Anisophyllea rhomboidea Baill.; Anisophyllea trapezoidalis (Baill.) Baill.; Anisophyllum trapezoidale Baill.

Species of flowering plant

Anisophyllea disticha is a plant of tropical Asia in the family Anisophylleaceae. The specific epithet disticha is from the Latin meaning "2-ranked", referring to the leaf arrangement.

== Description ==
Anisophyllea disticha grows as a shrub or small tree up to 7 metres (20 ft) tall with a stem diameter of up to 5 cm (2 in). Its bark is smooth. The ellipsoid fruits ripen red and measure up to 2.5 cm (1 in) long.

== Distribution and habitat ==
Anisophyllea disticha grows naturally in Sumatra, Peninsular Malaysia and Borneo. Its habitat is forests from sea-level to 1,000 m (3,300 ft) altitude.
