= Anisophyllea nitida =

Conservation status
- Vulnerable (IUCN 2.3)

Scientific classification
- Kingdom: Plantae
- Clade: Tracheophytes
- Clade: Angiosperms
- Clade: Eudicots
- Clade: Rosids
- Order: Cucurbitales
- Family: Anisophylleaceae
- Genus: Anisophyllea
- Species: A. nitida

Binomial name
- Anisophyllea nitida Madani

Species of tree

Anisophyllea nitida is a tree of Borneo in the family Anisophylleaceae. The specific epithet nitida is from the Latin meaning "polished", referring to the shiny appearance of the upper leaf surface.

== Description ==
Anisophyllea nitida grows as a tree up to 23 metres (80 ft) tall with a trunk diameter of up to 25 cm (10 in). The bark is smooth to scaly. The ellipsoid fruits measure up to 5 cm (2 in) long.

== Distribution and habitat ==
Anisophyllea nitida is endemic to Borneo. Its habitat is dipterocarp forests.
