= Poga =

Scientific classification
- Kingdom: Plantae
- Clade: Tracheophytes
- Clade: Angiosperms
- Clade: Eudicots
- Clade: Rosids
- Order: Cucurbitales
- Family: Anisophylleaceae
- Genus: Poga; Pierre
- Species: P. oleosa

Binomial name
- Poga oleosa Pierre

Genus of flowering plants

Poga is a genus of flowering plants in the family Anisophylleaceae. It has only one currently accepted species, Poga oleosa, a large tree found from southeast Nigeria to Gabon. Its common names include afo nut, inoi/inoy nut and poga. Its seeds are dispersed by forest elephants (Loxodonta cyclotis). Local people collect and sell the edible nuts for their oil. The wood, known as ovoga, is used for veneers, furniture and boxes.
