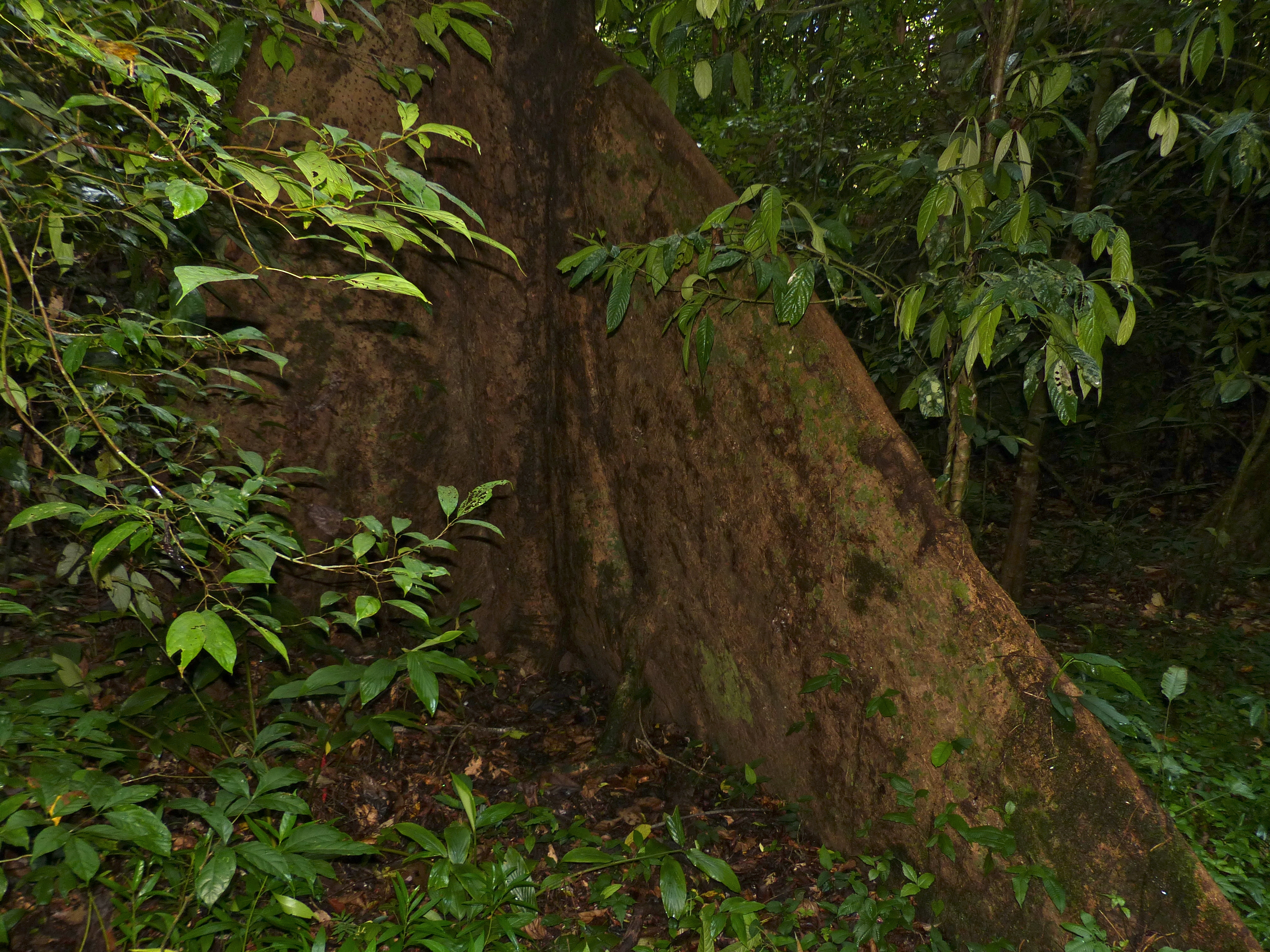

Conservation status
- Least Concern (IUCN 3.1)

Scientific classification
- Kingdom: Plantae
- Clade: Tracheophytes
- Clade: Angiosperms
- Clade: Eudicots
- Clade: Rosids
- Order: Cucurbitales
- Family: Tetramelaceae
- Genus: Octomeles; Miq.
- Species: O. sumatrana

Binomial name
- Octomeles sumatrana Miq.

= Octomeles =

Genus of trees

Octomeles is a monotypic genus of plant in family Tetramelaceae. The sole species is Octomeles sumatrana, sometimes written O. sumatranum.

Octomeles sumatrana, commonly called Benuang, or Ilimo, is found in Brunei, Indonesia, Malaysia, Papua New Guinea, the Philippines, and the Solomon Islands. It and Tetrameles nudiflora are the only two species in the family Tetramelaceae. They were previously classified in the Datiscaceae but found genetically not to form a natural clade with the other members of that family.

== Description ==
The tree is dioecious and large, reaching up to 75 metres (246 ft) in height and up to 4 m (13 ft) diameter above the buttresses. A pioneer species, it regenerates quickly in disturbed habitats such as logged forest and previously cultivated land. It has been known to grow as much as 25 m (82 ft) in height and up to 47 cm (19 in) diameter at breast height (DBH) in just four years. Also, like other pioneer species, it is relatively short lived; even the emergent titans rarely exceeding 85 years of age. It also has noteworthy buttresses; up to 6 m (20 ft) high by up to 15 m (49 ft) in length. On Bougainville the buttresses take a different form; higher and narrower, up to 16 m (52 ft) in height while only 5.5 m (18 ft) length.
