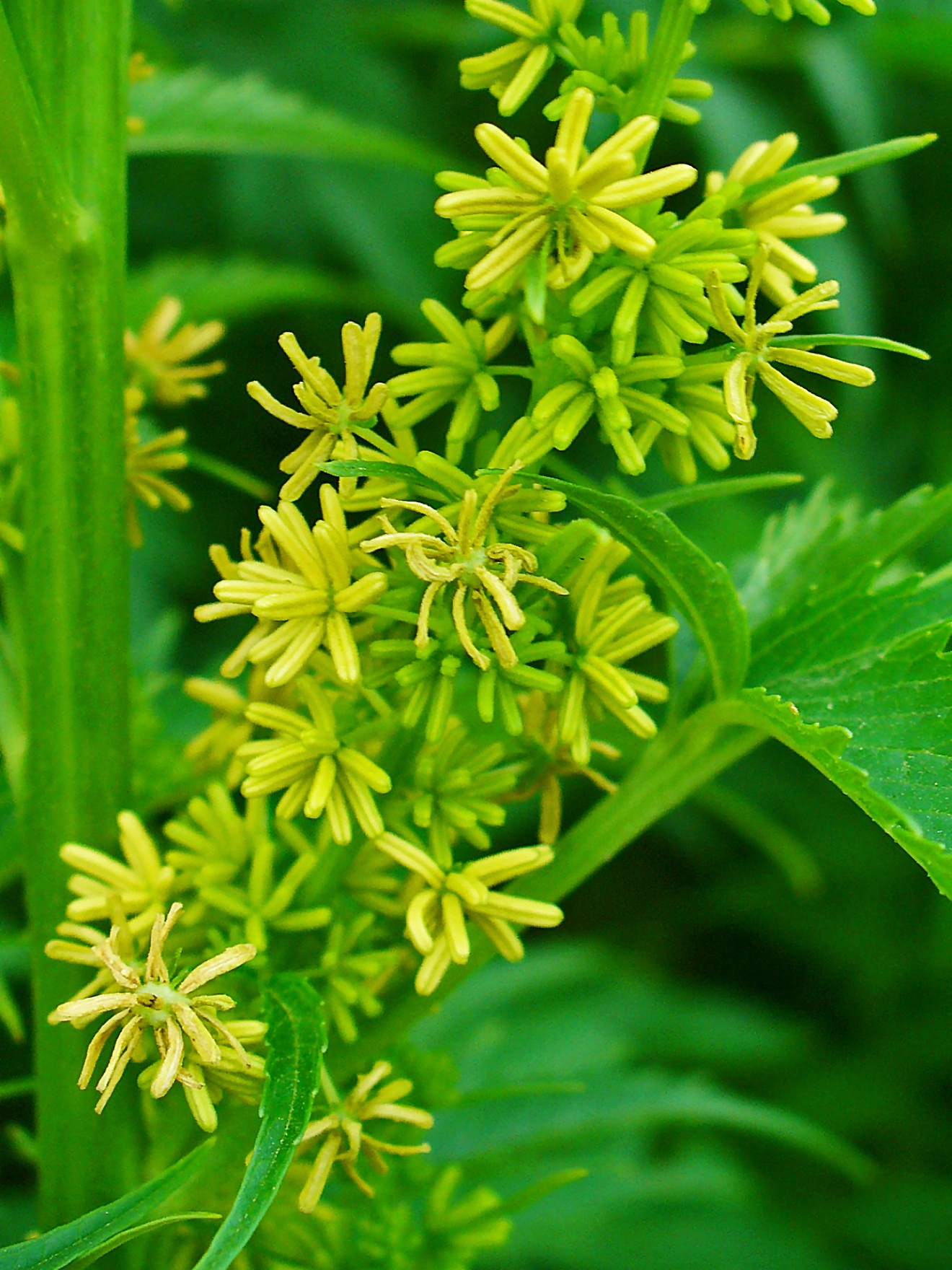
- Male flowers

Scientific classification
- Kingdom: Plantae
- Clade: Tracheophytes
- Clade: Angiosperms
- Clade: Eudicots
- Clade: Rosids
- Order: Cucurbitales
- Family: Datiscaceae
- Genus: Datisca
- Species: D. cannabina

Binomial name
- Datisca cannabina L.

Synonyms
- List: Cannabina laevis Moench; Datisca glabra Stokes; Datisca nepalensis D.Don

= Datisca cannabina =

Species of plant in the genus Datisca

Datisca cannabina, called false hemp, is a species of flowering plant in the genus Datisca, family Datiscaceae, native to the Aegean Islands, Crete, Cyprus, Anatolia, the Levant, the Transcaucasus, Iraq, Iran, Central Asia, Afghanistan, Pakistan, the western Himalayas and Nepal. It is one of the very few species known to have true androdioecy, meaning it has a mix of male and hermaphroditic individuals.

This tall herbaceous perennial grows to a maximum height and spread of 2.5 m (8.2 ft), with ash-like clusters of bright green leaves, and arching shoots covered in tassels of small green and white flowers during summer. It is hardy but prefers a sheltered position in full sun or partial shade.

Local artisans use its roots to produce a fast yellow dye.

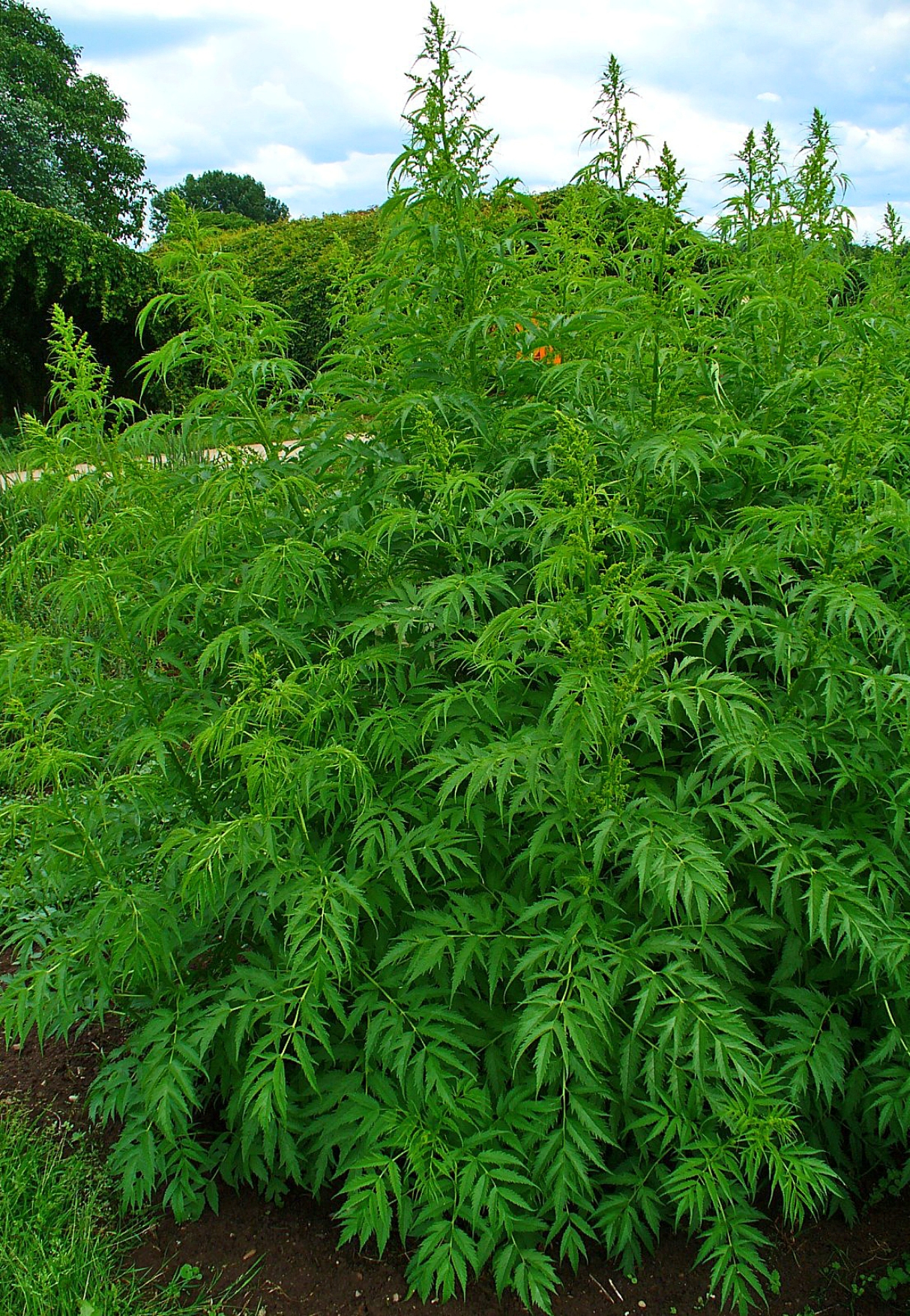
Growth form

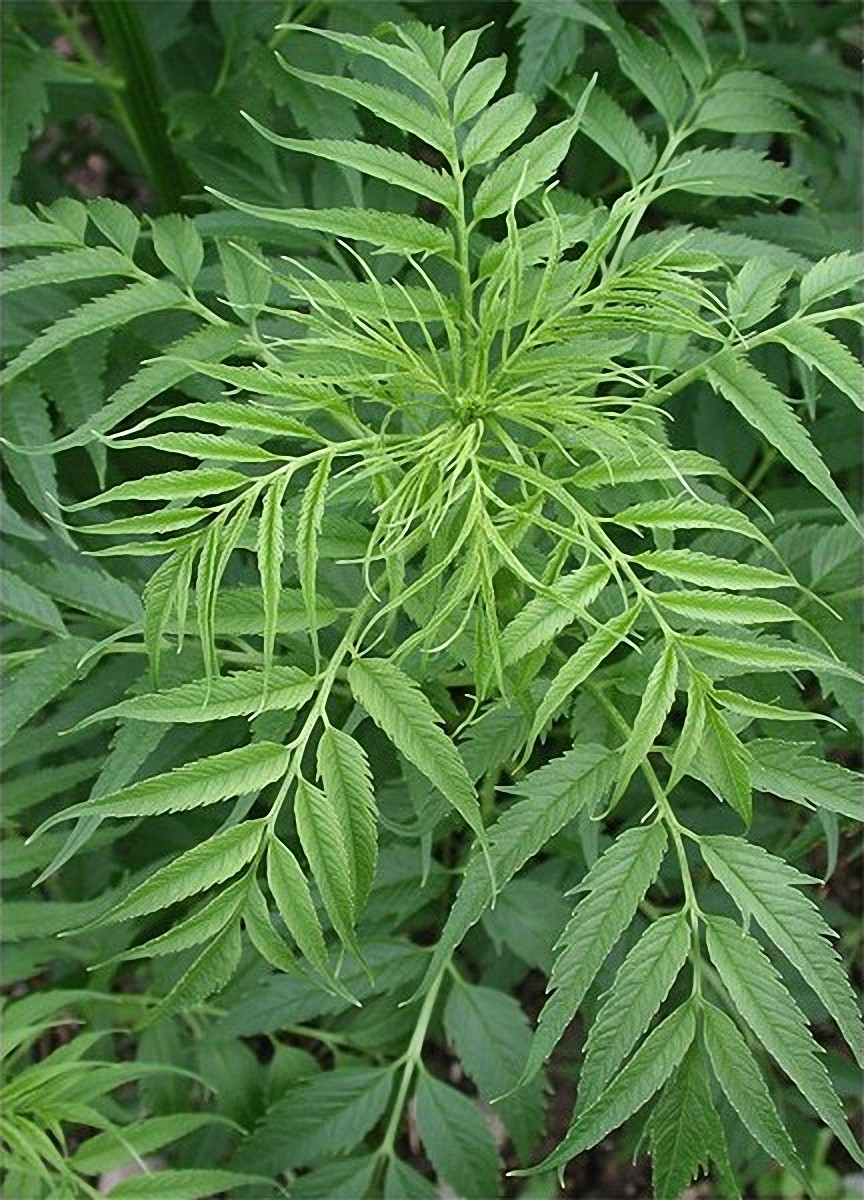
Top

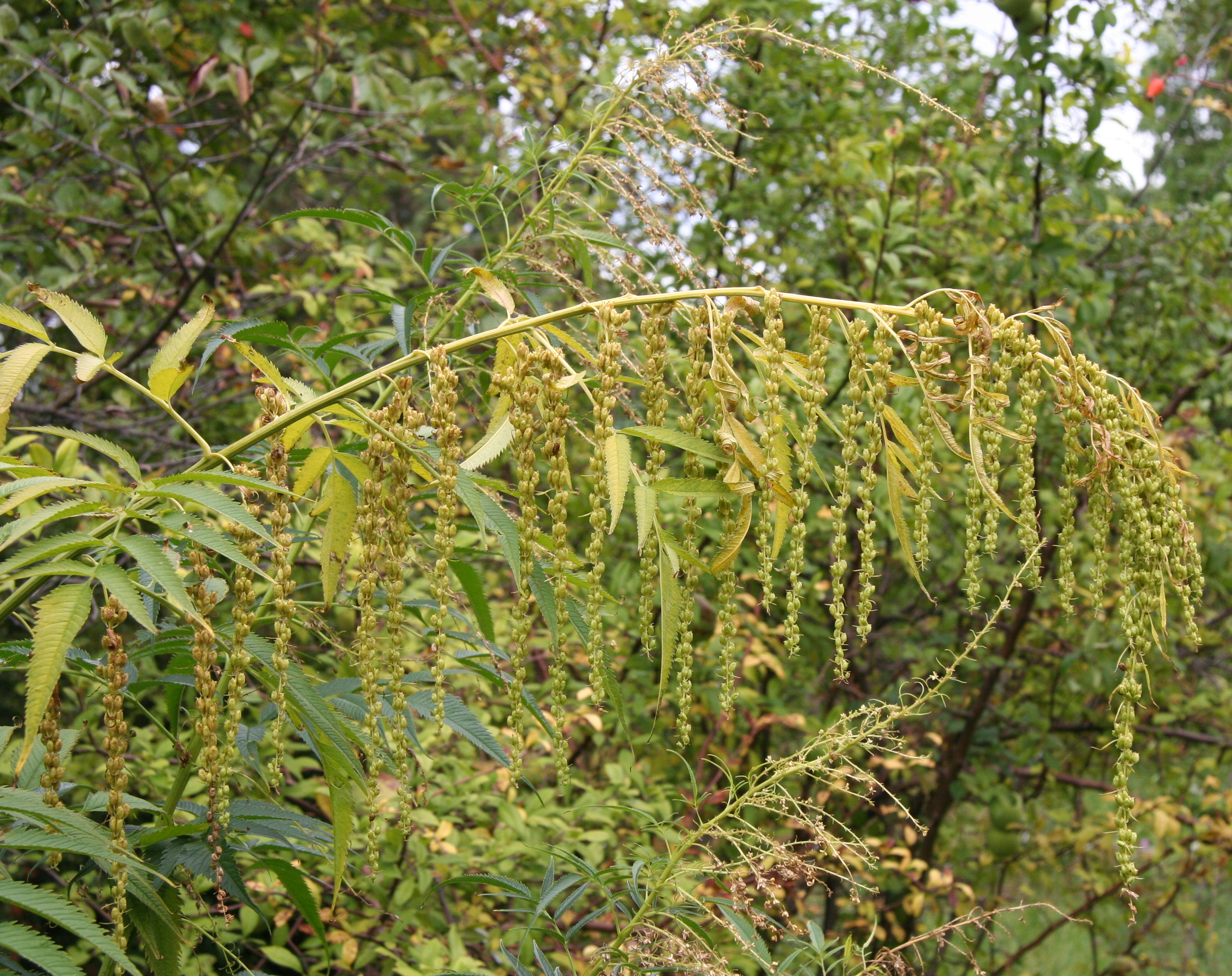
In fruit

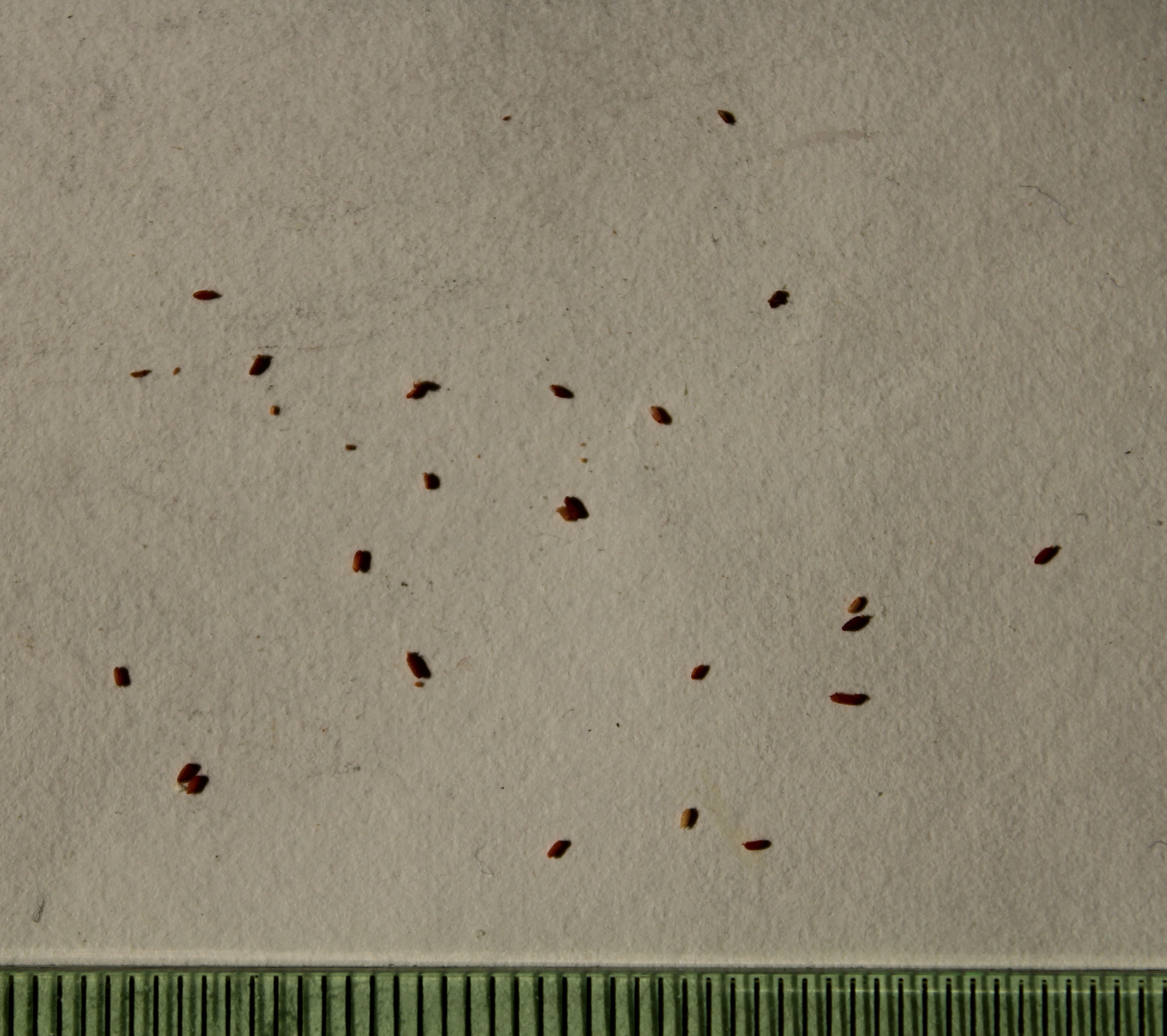
Seeds
