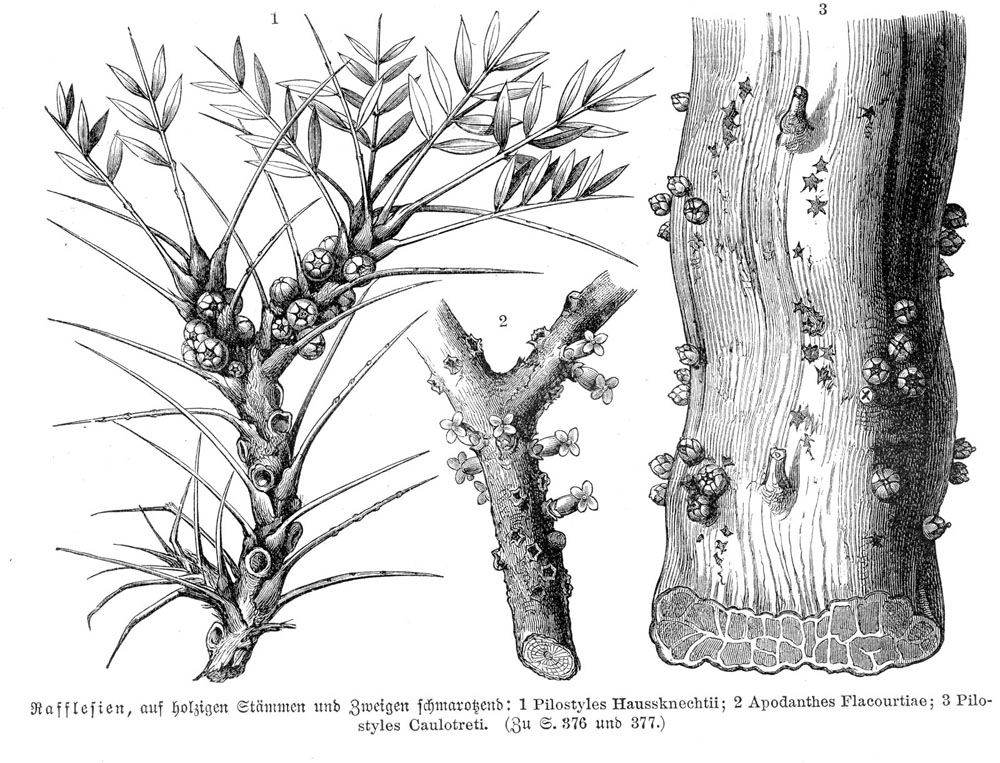
- Apodanthes caseariae botanical illustration

Scientific classification
- Kingdom: Plantae
- Clade: Tracheophytes
- Clade: Angiosperms
- Clade: Eudicots
- Clade: Rosids
- Order: Cucurbitales
- Family: Apodanthaceae
- Genus: Apodanthes; Poit.
- Species: A. caseariae

Binomial name
- Apodanthes caseariae Poit.

Synonyms
- List: Apodanthes minarum Vattimo; Apodanthes panamensis Vattimo; Apodanthes roraimae Vattimo; Apodanthes surinamensis Pulle; Apodanthes tribracteata Rusby

= Apodanthes =

Genus of endoparasitic plants

Apodanthes is a genus of flowering plants in the family Apodanthaceae. It has only one currently accepted species, Apodanthes caseariae, native to Central America and northern South America. It is a holoparasite that lives inside plants from the families Salicaceae and Fabaceae, and emerges only to flower.
