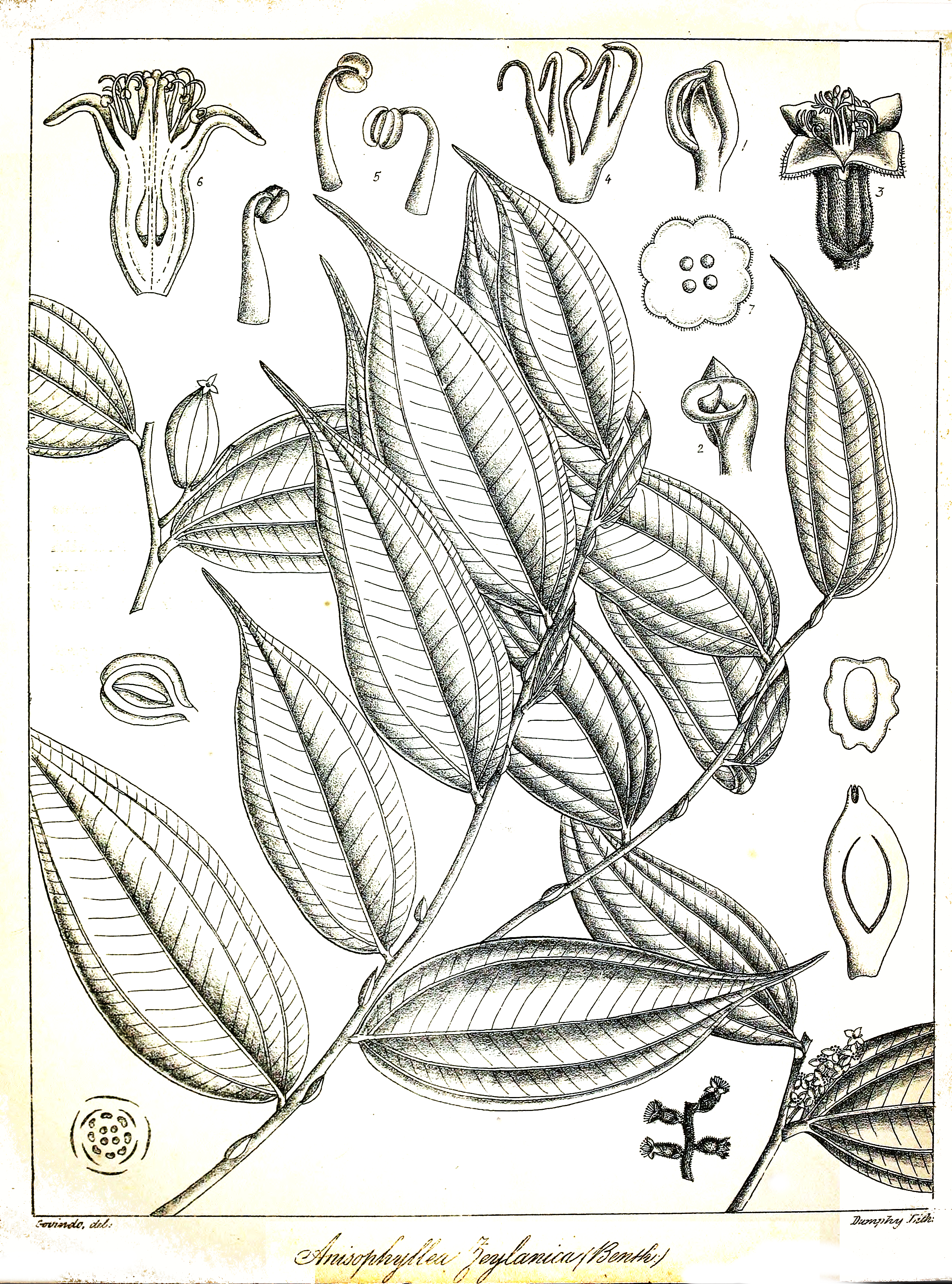
- Anisophyllea cinnamomoides

Scientific classification
- Kingdom: Plantae
- Clade: Tracheophytes
- Clade: Angiosperms
- Clade: Eudicots
- Clade: Rosids
- Order: Cucurbitales
- Family: Anisophylleaceae
- Genus: Anisophyllea; R.Br. ex Sabine

Species
- See text

= Anisophyllea =

Genus of flowering plants

Anisophyllea is a genus of plant in the family Anisophylleaceae. The generic name is from the Greek meaning "unequal leaf", referring to the dimorphism of the leaves.

== Description ==
Anisophyllea species grow as shrubs or trees. The bark is smooth to flaky. The flowers are unisexual. The fruits are drupes (pitted) and are ellipsoid or pear-shaped.

== Distribution and habitat ==
Anisophyllea species are distributed widely throughout the old world tropics, including Africa, India, Sri Lanka, mainland Southeast Asia, Sumatra and Borneo. Their habitat is lowland and hill forests from sea-level to 1,000 metres (3,300 ft) altitude.

== Species ==
As of June 2014 The Plant List recognises about 36 accepted species:

- Anisophyllea apetala Scort. ex King
- Anisophyllea beccariana Baill.
- Anisophyllea boehmii Engl.
- Anisophyllea buchneri Engl. & Brehmer
- Anisophyllea buettneri Engl.
- Anisophyllea cabole Henriq.
- Anisophyllea chartacea Madani
- Anisophyllea cinnamomoides (Gardner & Champ.) Alston
- Anisophyllea corneri Ding Hou
- Anisophyllea curtisii King
- Anisophyllea dichostila Engl. & Brehmer
- Anisophyllea disticha (Jack) Baill.
- Anisophyllea fallax Scott-Elliot
- Anisophyllea ferruginea Ding Hou
- Anisophyllea glandulifolia Madani
- Anisophyllea globosa Madani
- Anisophyllea grandis (Benth.) Burkill
- Anisophyllea griffithii Oliv.
- Anisophyllea guianensis Sandwith
- Anisophyllea impressinervia Madani
- Anisophyllea ismailii J.A.McDonald
- Anisophyllea laurina R.Br. ex Sabine
- Anisophyllea manausensis Pires & W.A.Rodrigues
- Anisophyllea meniaudii Aubrév. & Pellegr.
- Anisophyllea myriosticta Floret
- Anisophyllea nitida Madani
- Anisophyllea obtusifolia Engl. & Brehmer
- Anisophyllea penninervata J.E.Vidal
- Anisophyllea polyneura Floret
- Anisophyllea pomifera Engl. & Brehmer
- Anisophyllea purpurascens Hutch. & Dalziel
- Anisophyllea quangensis Engl. ex Henriq.
- Anisophyllea reticulata Kochummen
- Anisophyllea rhomboidea Baill.
- Anisophyllea scortechinii King
- Anisophyllea sororia Pierre
- Anisophyllea thouarsiana Baill.
