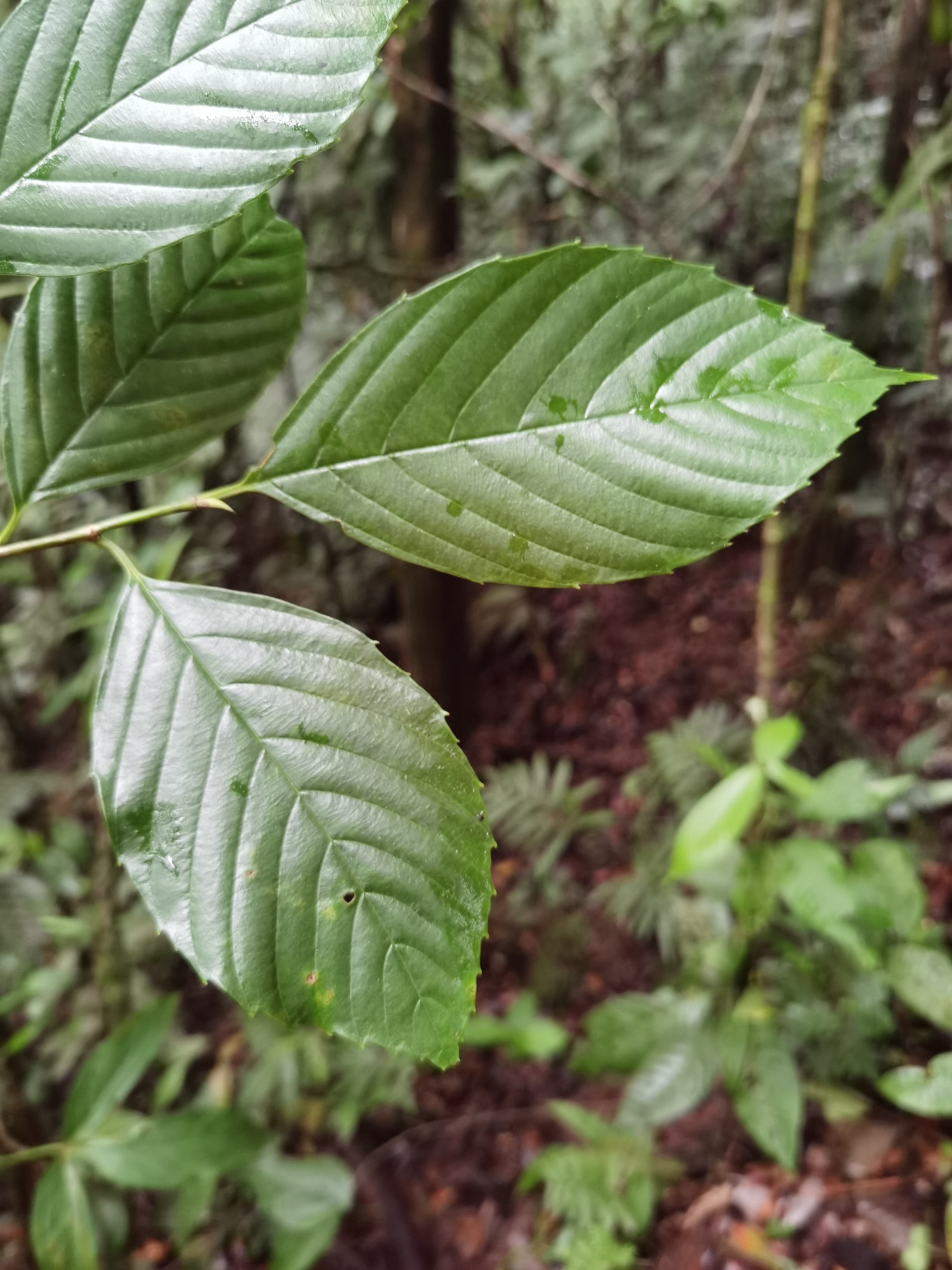

Conservation status
- Near Threatened (IUCN 3.1)

Scientific classification
- Kingdom: Plantae
- Clade: Tracheophytes
- Clade: Angiosperms
- Clade: Eudicots
- Clade: Rosids
- Order: Fagales
- Family: Ticodendraceae; Gómez-Laur. & L.D.Gómez
- Genus: Ticodendron; Gómez-Laur. & L.D.Gómez
- Species: T. incognitum

Binomial name
- Ticodendron incognitum Gómez-Laur. & L.D.Gómez
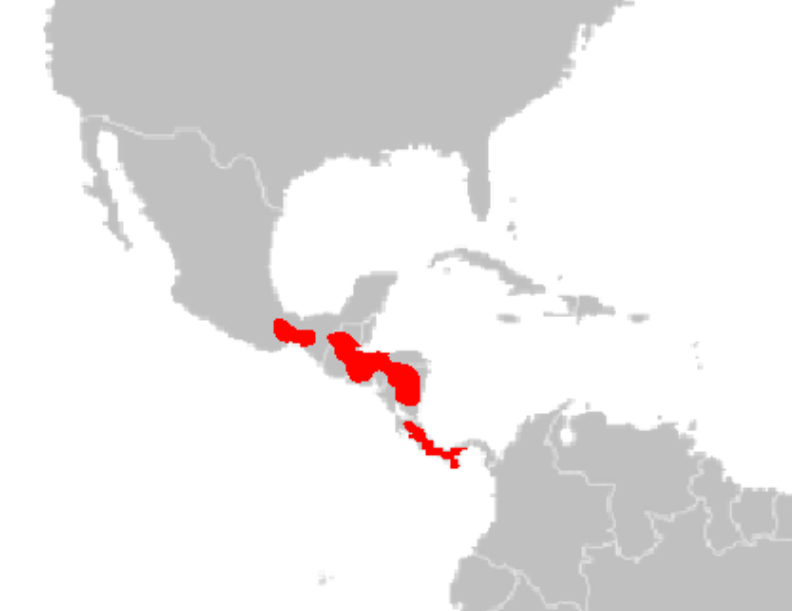

= Ticodendron =

Genus of plants

Ticodendron incognitum is the only species of Ticodendron, and the only member of the family Ticodendraceae. It is most closely related to the family Betulaceae.

It was discovered only in 1989 in Costa Rica, having been overlooked previously due to its habitat in poorly researched cloud forests and its very 'ordinary' appearance; further research showed its range extends from southern Mexico (Veracruz, Oaxaca, Chiapas), south through Central America to Panama.

It is a tree, 20–30 m tall, superficially resembling an alder in appearance, with alternate, simple leaves 5–12 cm long with a serrated margin. It is generally dioecious, with separate male and female plants.

== Fossil record ==
†Ferrignocarpus bivalvis fossil fruits, from the Middle Eocene of Oregon and the Early Eocene London Clay flora of southern England, correspond closely in morphology and anatomy to fruits of extant Ticodendron.
