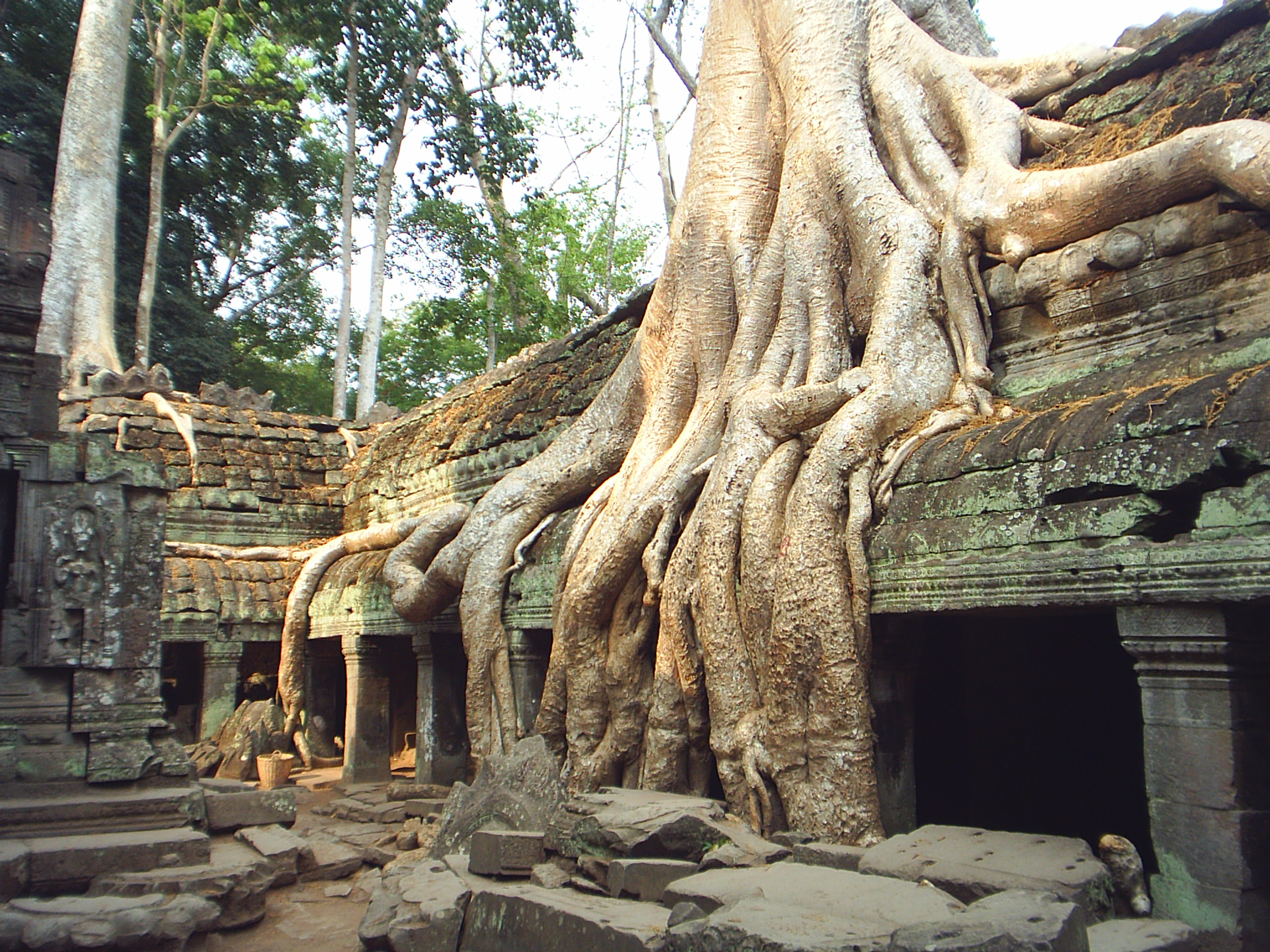
- In the Ta Prohm temple ruins in Cambodia

Conservation status
- Least Concern (IUCN 3.1)

Scientific classification
- Kingdom: Plantae
- Clade: Tracheophytes
- Clade: Angiosperms
- Clade: Eudicots
- Clade: Rosids
- Order: Cucurbitales
- Family: Tetramelaceae
- Genus: Tetrameles; R.Br.
- Species: T. nudiflora

Binomial name
- Tetrameles nudiflora R.Br.

Synonyms
- Anictoclea Nimmo; Macaranga balakrishnanii B.Mitra & Chakrab.; Anictoclea grahamiana Nimmo; Tetrameles grahamiana (Nimmo) Wight; Tetrameles grahamiana var. ceylanica A.DC.; Tetrameles horsfieldii Steud.; Tetrameles rufinervis Miq.

= Tetrameles =

Genus of trees

Tetrameles is a genus of flowering plants in the family Tetramelaceae with one species, Tetrameles nudiflora. It grows as a large deciduous tree and is found across southern Asia from India through southeast Asia, Malesia, and into northern Australia.

== Taxonomy ==
Robert Brown described Tetrameles nudiflora in 1844, from material collected in Java. It is the only species in its genus Tetrameles, and together with Octomeles sumatrana comprise the only two species in the family Tetramelaceae. They were previously classified in the Datiscaceae but found genetically to not form a natural clade with the other members of that family.

== Description ==
Tetrameles nudiflora grows as a large dioecious tree, capable of growing over 45 m tall with a spread of over 10 m. The trunk is buttressed, and the bark is grey and often shiny. The tree often contains large hollows in the trunk or branches. It is deciduous, bare of leaves between October and December in Australia and typically January–April in Vietnam. The genus name is derived from the Ancient Greek tetra "four" and melos "part", and refers to the flower having four sepals. The species name is from the Latin nudiflora "bare flowers". The largest tree in Thailand is of this species, and was measured on 29 February 2016 by dendrologist Marc Meyer using a Nikon Forestry 500/pro laser. Its height is exactly 64.20 m (210.6 ft) with a girth of exactly 24.20 m (79.4 ft).

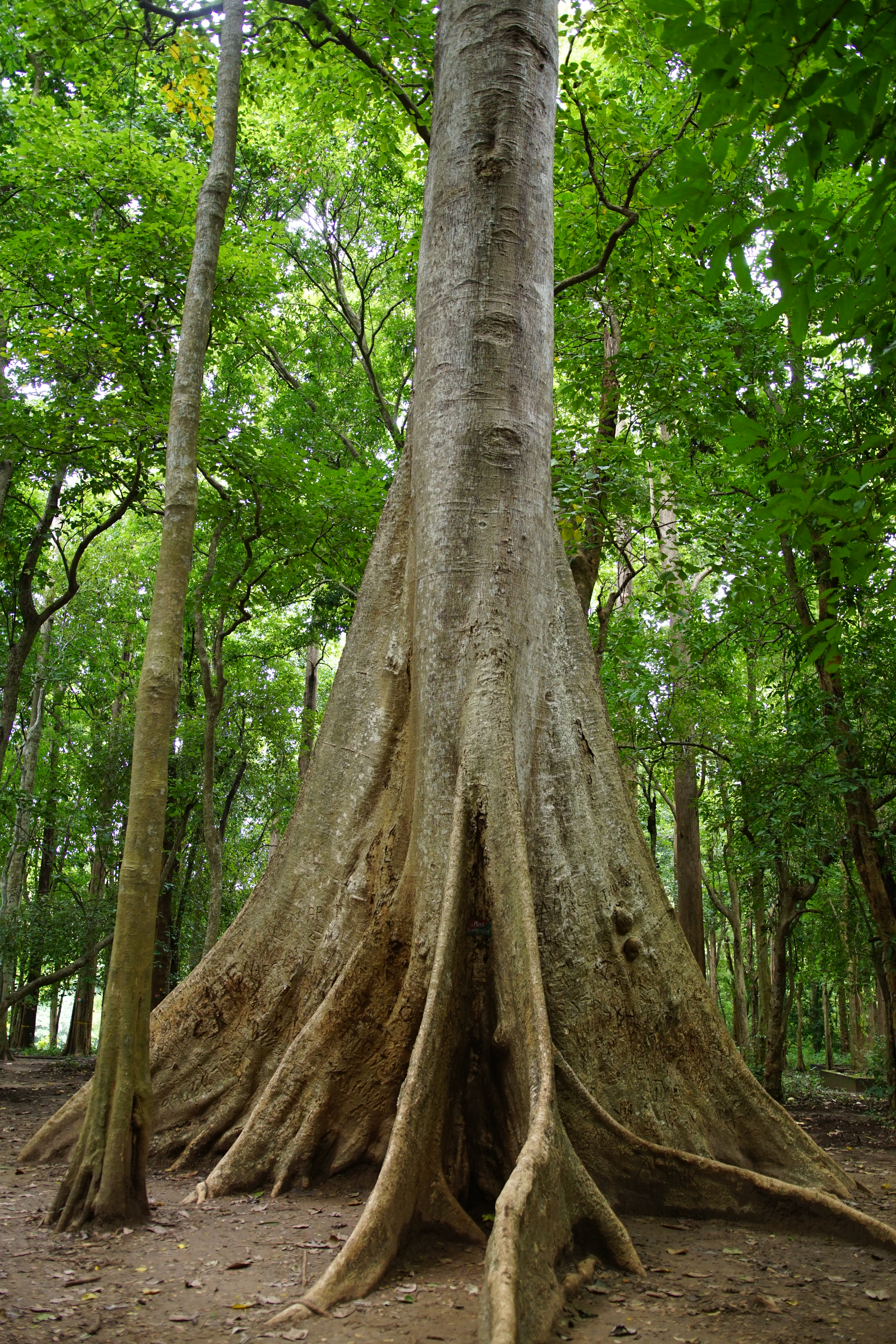
buttressed trunk (Nilambur teak forest)

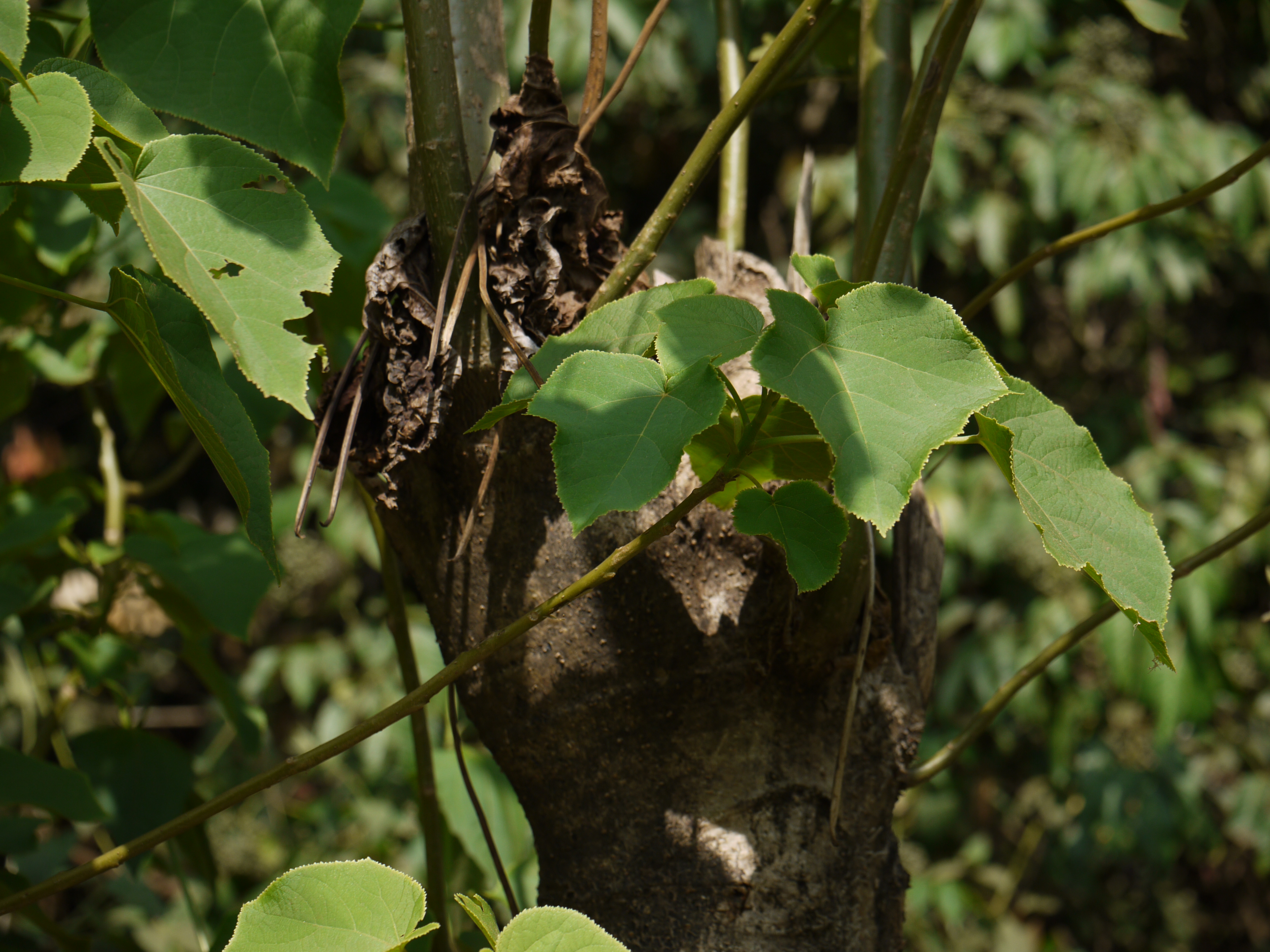
leaves of T. nudiflora

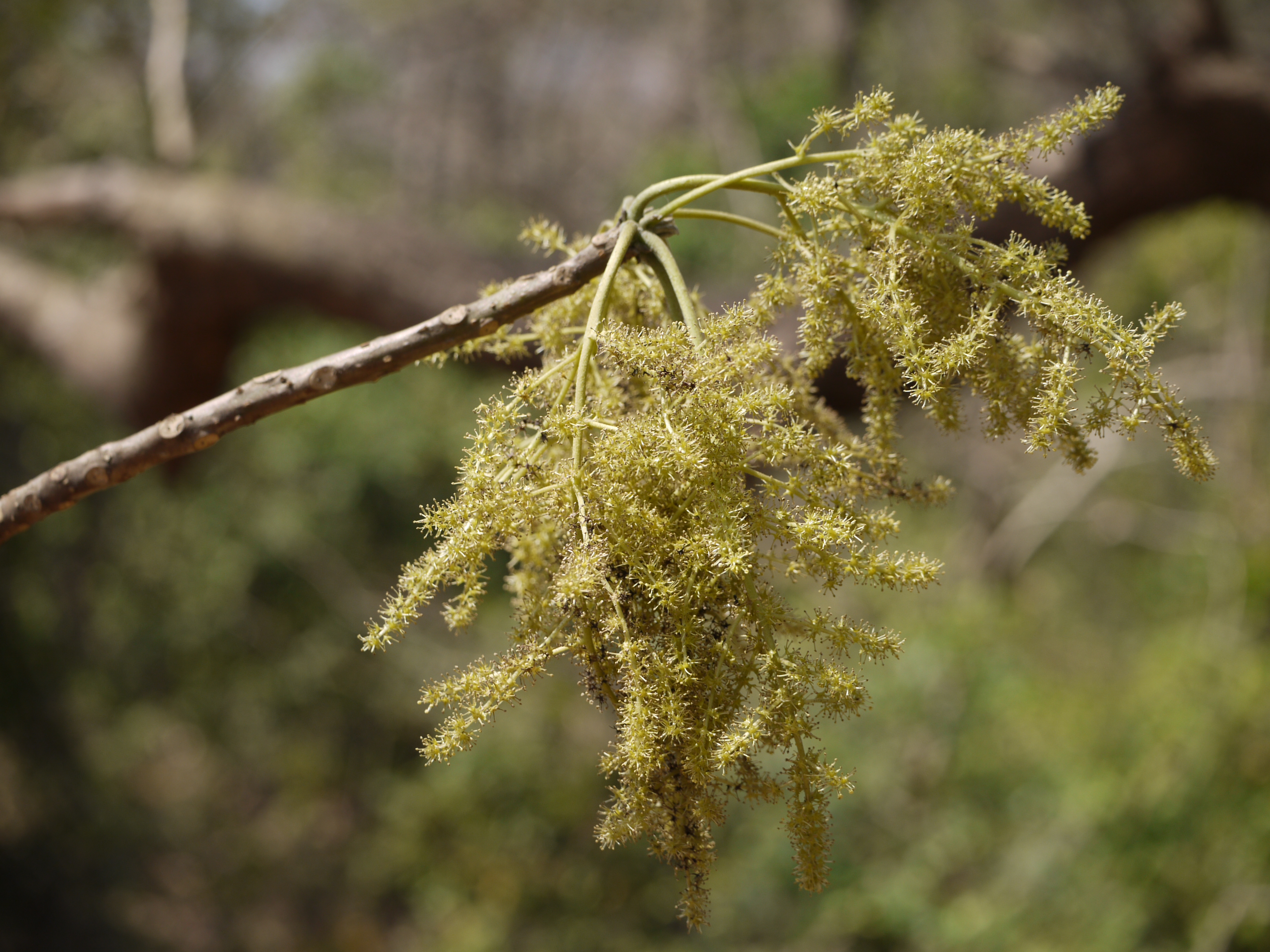
male flowers

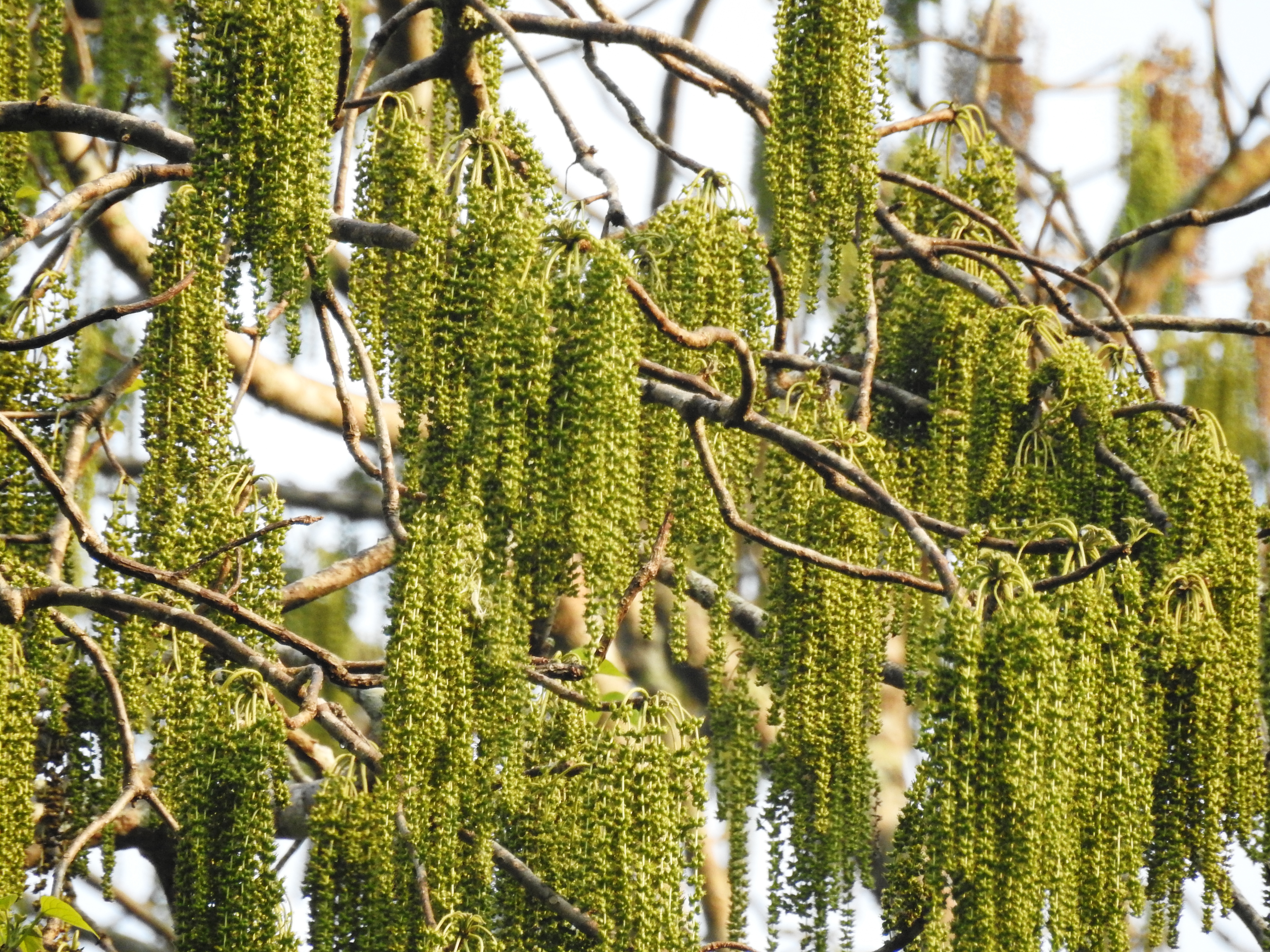
female flowers

== Distribution and habitat ==
Tetrameles nudiflora is a subtropical and tropical forest species, native to India, Sri Lanka, Bangladesh, Bhutan, Myanmar, China, Laos, Cambodia, Thailand, Vietnam, Malaysia, Indonesia, East Timor, Papua New Guinea, and into the Cape York Peninsula in north Queensland (Australia).

In India, these trees can be found in particularly large numbers in the Thattekad Bird Sanctuary, Kerala. In Myanmar, an old, around 60 m (200 ft) specimen can be found in the University of Yangon campus (illustrated). In Vietnam, where the species is called tung or thung, a number of fine specimens are shown to visitors in Cat Tien National Park – one within walking distance of the park headquarters.

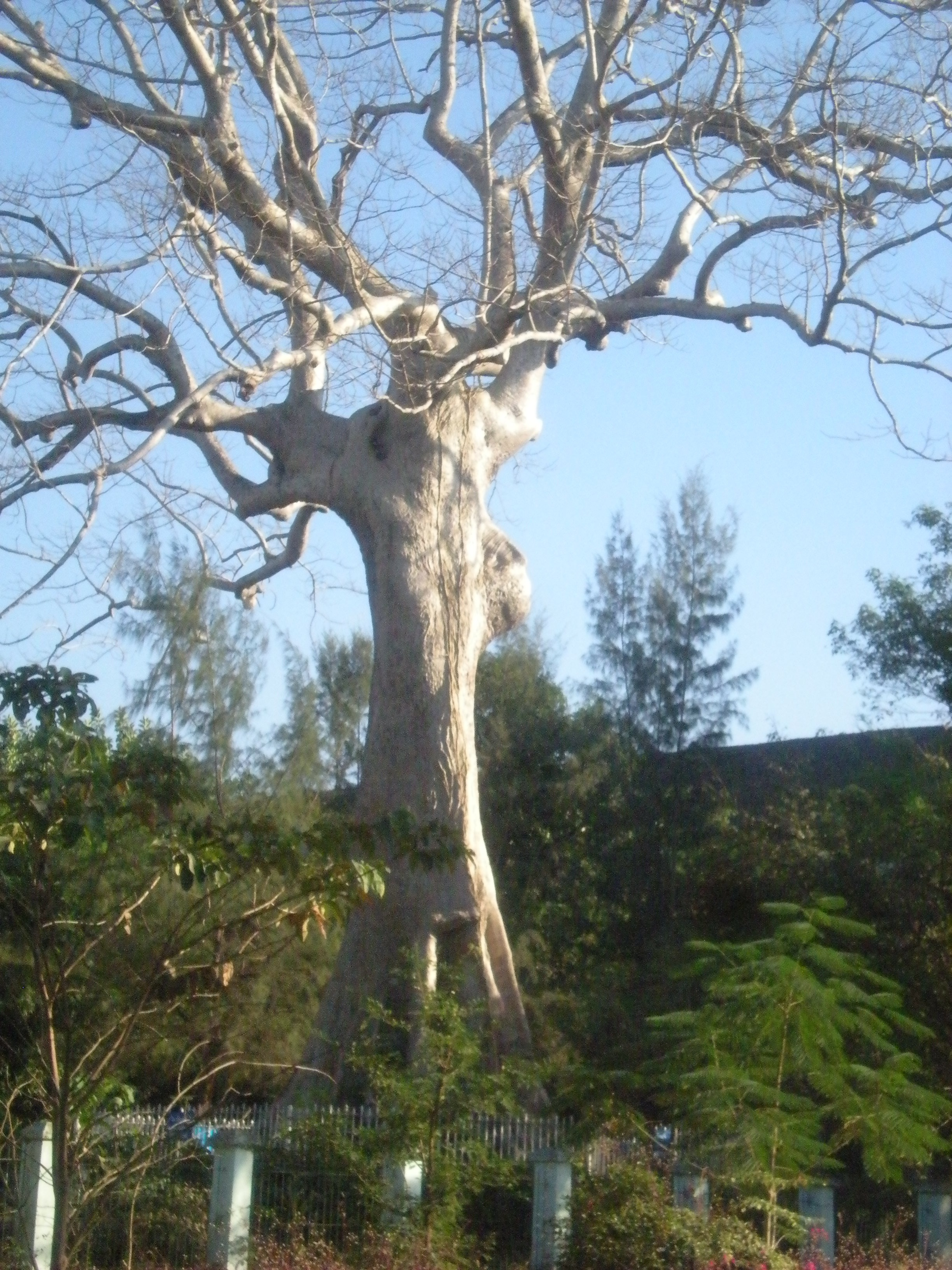
University of Yangon

== Uses and cultivation ==
Many specimens have grown to immense proportions of height and width. Its large size means that Tetrameles nudiflora is suited to nature reserves, parks and other large spaces rather than private gardens.

Despite its timber being soft, it is used in New Guinea to make canoes. T. nudiflora does not require deep soil and is a useful 'coloniser' species for forest regeneration.

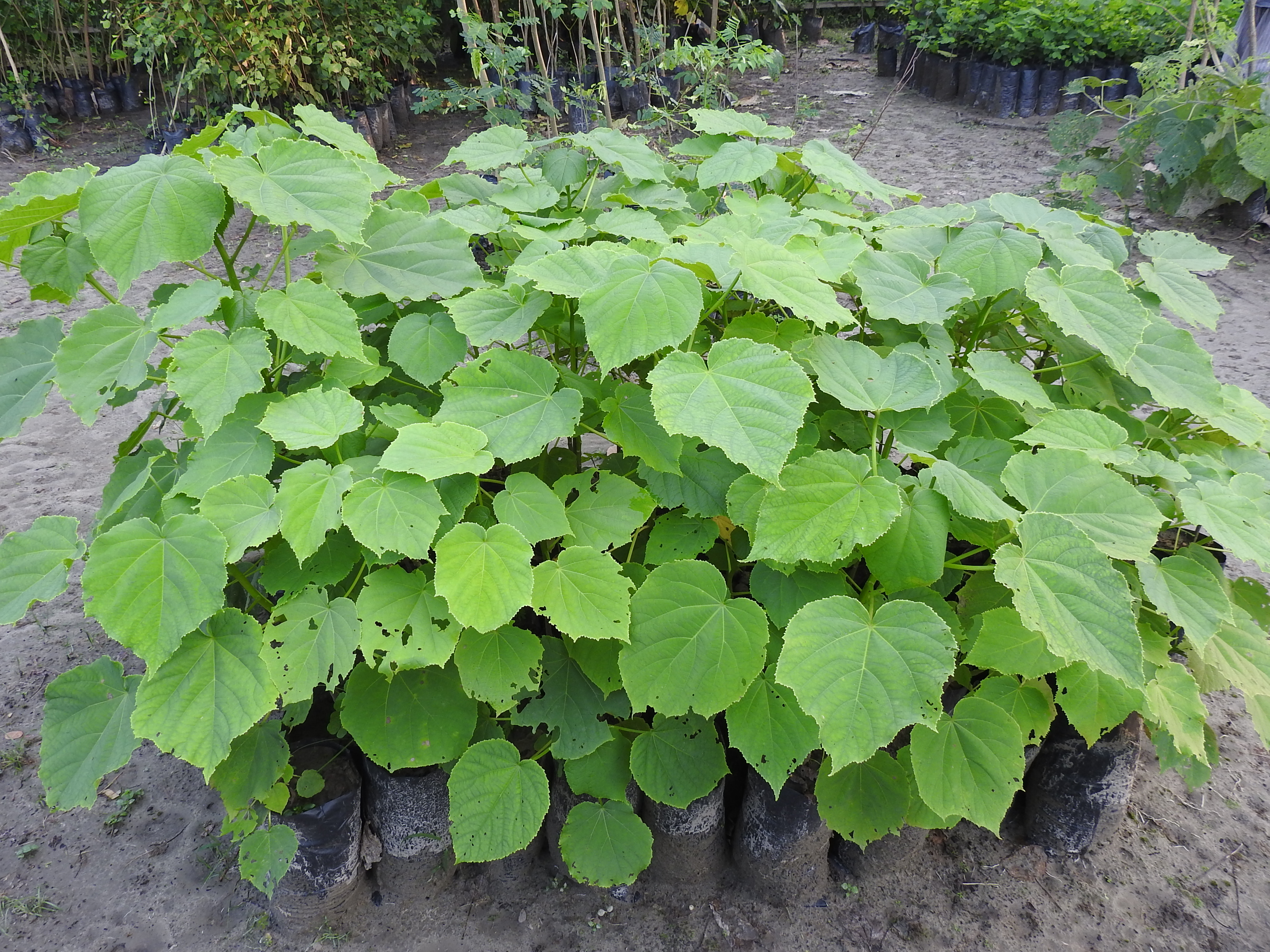
Seedlings prepared for reforestation
