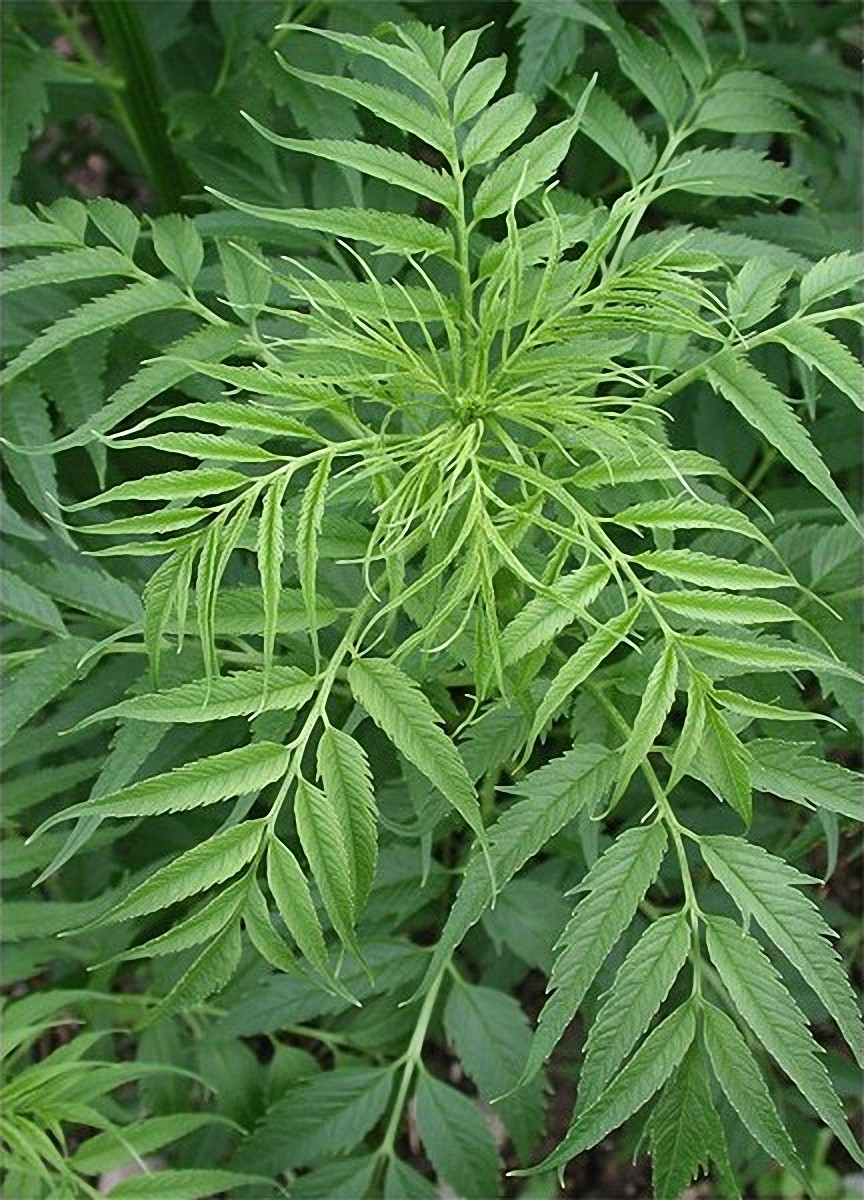
- Datisca cannabina

Scientific classification
- Kingdom: Plantae
- Clade: Tracheophytes
- Clade: Angiosperms
- Clade: Eudicots
- Clade: Rosids
- Order: Cucurbitales
- Family: Datiscaceae; Dumort.
- Genus: Datisca; L.
- The range of Datisca

Synonyms
- Cannabina Mill.; Tricerastes C.Presl

= Datisca =

Genus of flowering plants

The Datiscaceae are a family of dicotyledonous plants, containing two species of the genus Datisca. Two other genera, Octomeles and Tetrameles, are now classified in the family Tetramelaceae.

Datiscaceae are large herbaceous plants, with alternate and pinnate leaves.

They are actinorhizal plants, that host nitrogen-fixing bacteria in their roots, and are the only ones that are non-woody, although non-actinorrhizal plants also fix nitrogen, such as the legumes.

== Species ==
The genus Datisca contains two or three species; two from Asia and one from North America.

The species Datisca cannabina is found in Crete and Turkey, and closely related Datisca nepalensis is found in the Himalayas, and is sometimes included in D. cannabina. It grows to about 2.0 m tall, and in May to August it produces small greenish-yellow flowers. This species is strictly dioecious, with male and female flowers on different plants. It is grown for ornamental foliage and can be used to produce a laxative and a yellow dye.

The North American species Datisca glomerata is native to California, Nevada, and Mexico. This species is more or less dioecious, except that female plants may possess some bisexual flowers, as well.
