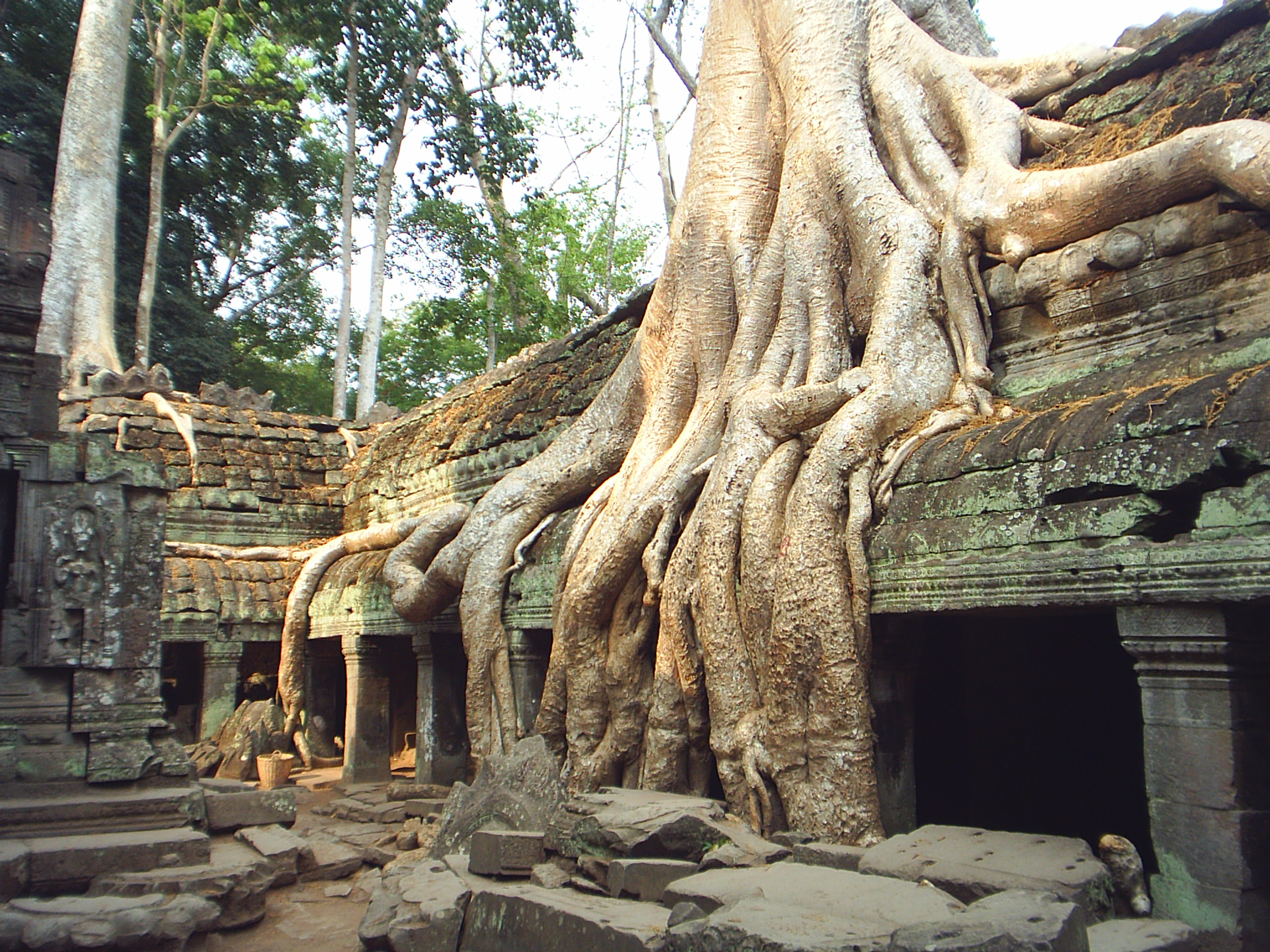
- Roots of a Tetrameles nudiflora tree along a gallery in Ta Prohm

Scientific classification
- Kingdom: Plantae
- Clade: Tracheophytes
- Clade: Angiosperms
- Clade: Eudicots
- Clade: Rosids
- Order: Cucurbitales
- Family: Tetramelaceae; Airy Shaw

Genera
- Octomeles Miq.; Tetrameles R.Br.

= Tetramelaceae =

Family of plants

The Tetramelaceae are a family of plants in the order Cucurbitales, containing two genera of mostly Asian, large trees, Octomeles and Tetrameles, each with a single species. These genera were formerly placed in the Datiscaceae, but genetic studies confirmed that they do not form a natural clade with the other members of that family.
