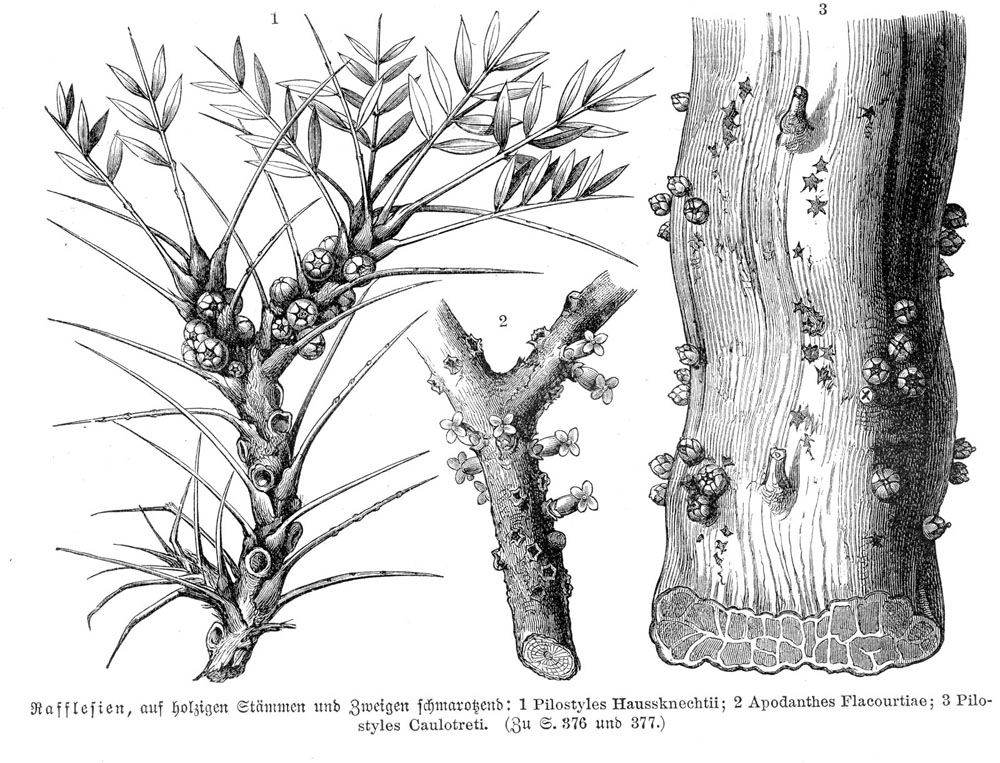

Scientific classification
- Kingdom: Plantae
- Clade: Tracheophytes
- Clade: Angiosperms
- Clade: Eudicots
- Clade: Rosids
- Order: Cucurbitales
- Family: Apodanthaceae; Tiegh. ex Takht.

Genera
- Apodanthes; Pilostyles

= Apodanthaceae =

Family of flowering plants

The family Apodanthaceae comprises about 10 species of endoparasitic herbs. They live in the branches or stems of their hosts (as filaments similar to a fungal mycelium), emerging only to flower and fruit. The plants produce no green parts and do not carry out any photosynthesis (that is, they are holoparasitic). There are two genera: Pilostyles and Apodanthes. A third genus, Berlinianche, was never validly published.

The native range of Apodanthes is restricted to Central and tropical South America, while Pilostyles has a much wider though disjointed native range, encompassing many countries in tropical and subtropical America, a section of Africa from Gabon to Tanzania and down to Zimbabwe, as well as Turkey, Iran, Iraq, and Western Australia.

== Taxonomy ==
The relationship of the Apodanthaceae to other plant families remains unresolved, though recent research has given more clarity to the family's position and suggests inclusion in the order Malpighiales with a possible link to the family Rafflesiaceae.

While the APG III system of classification (2009) listed the family's taxonomic position as uncertain, the APG IV update in 2016 assigned it to the Cucurbitales based on mitochondrial and nuclear DNA sequences. However, two 2024 studies, both of which use large sets of nuclear DNA for analysis, indicate that it is a basal member of the Malpighiales.

The difficulty with using plastid DNA for phylogenetics of the Apodanthaceae was discussed in a 2021 study by Li et al. This paper refers to the Apodanthaceae as one of five 'problematic' families (along with Balanophoraceae, Mitrastemonaceae, Rafflesiaceae, and Thismiaceae) and notes that plastome sequences in these families are highly reduced and they have unusually high substitution rates in the retained sequences, which can hamper proper phylogenetic alignment and cause long branch attraction artifacts.
