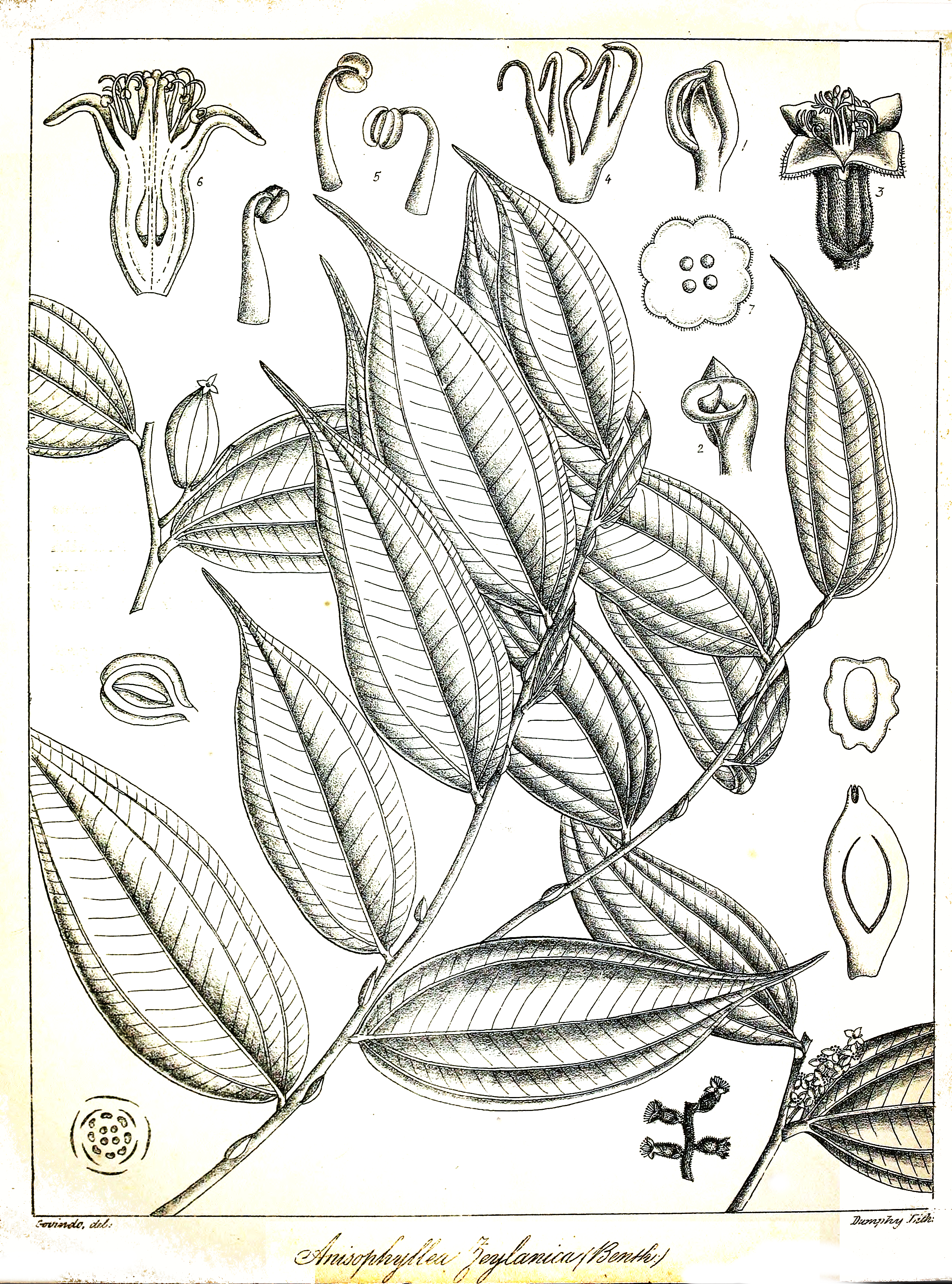

Scientific classification
- Kingdom: Plantae
- Clade: Tracheophytes
- Clade: Angiosperms
- Clade: Eudicots
- Clade: Rosids
- Order: Cucurbitales
- Family: Anisophylleaceae; Ridl. 1922

Type genus
- Anisophyllea R.Br. ex Sabine. 1824

Genera
- Anisophyllea R.Br. ex Sabine 1824; Combretocarpus Hook.f. 1865; Poga Pierre 1896; Polygonanthus Ducke 1932

= Anisophylleaceae =

Family of flowering plants

The Anisophylleaceae are a small family with four genera and about 70 species, in the order Cucurbitales, according to the APG II. However, it is more isolated from the other suprafamilial clades in this order, while it shows some similarities in flower morphology with the genus Ceratopetalum (family Cunoniaceae, order Oxalidales). Several wood features of this family are more primitive than those of the other families in the order Cucurbitales.

Previously, this family was categorized under its own order, Anisophylleales, by Takhtajan in 1997.

It is a pantropical family of shrubs and medium-sized to fairly large trees, occurring in wet, tropical forests and swamps of America, Africa and Asia.

The palmately veined leaves have a rather leathery texture, entire margins, and are often asymmetrical at the base. They have minute stipules or simply lack them. They are alternate; spiral, or distichous, or four-ranked (such as in Anisophyllea). The paired leaves may be different in size or shape.

The small flowers are regular and trimerous to pentamerous. They are usually aggregated in axillary racemes or panicles. The flower type varies considerably, most are monoecious, except Combretocarpus; which is hermaphrodite, having perfect flowers.

The inferior, tri- or quadrilocular ovary develops into a drupe or a samara (as in Combretocarpus) with usually one seed, but with three or four seeds in Poga.

== Systematics ==
Modern molecular phylogenetics suggest the following relationships:

- - Cucurbitaceae (outgroup)
  - Anisophylleaceae
    - Combretocarpus
    - - Polygonanthus
      - - Poga
        - Anisophyllea
