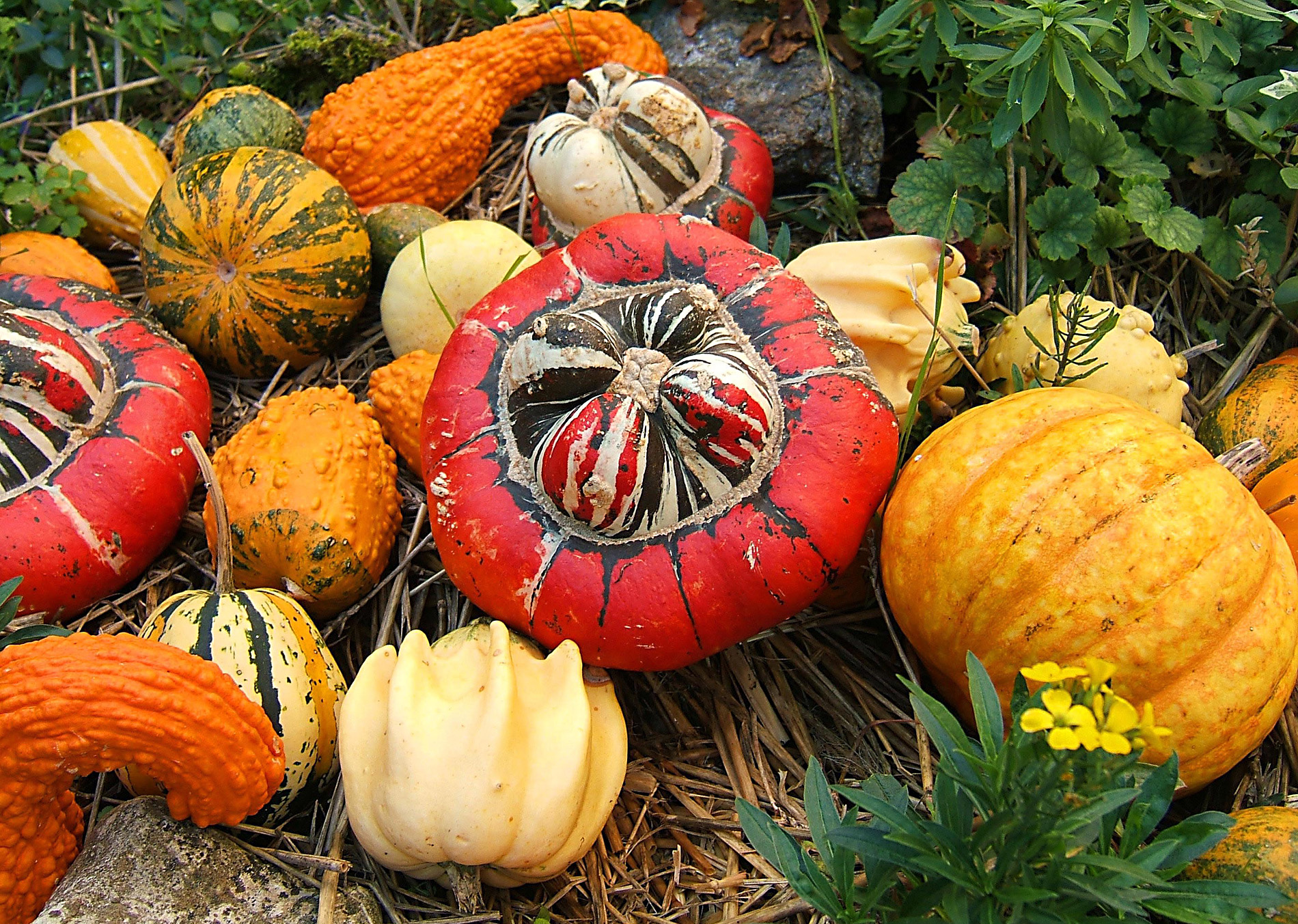

Scientific classification
- Kingdom: Plantae
- Clade: Tracheophytes
- Clade: Angiosperms
- Clade: Eudicots
- Clade: Rosids
- Clade: Fabids
- Order: Cucurbitales; Juss. ex Bercht. & J.Presl

Families
- Anisophylleaceae Ridl. 1922; Apodanthaceae Tiegh. ex Takht. 1987; Begoniaceae C. Agardh 1824 (begonia family); Coriariaceae DC. 1824; Corynocarpaceae Engl. 1897; Cucurbitaceae Juss. 1789 (gourd family); Datiscaceae Dumort. 1829; Tetramelaceae Airy Shaw 1965

Synonyms
- Anisophylleales Reveal & Doweld; Begoniales Link; Begonianae Doweld; Coriariales Lindley; Coriariopsida Parlatore; Corynocarpales Takhtajan; Corynocarpanae Takhtajan; Cucurbitanae Reveal; Cucurbitopsida Brongniart; Datiscales Dumortier

= Cucurbitales =

Cucurbitales Temporal range: 107–0 Ma Early Cretaceous – Recent

Order of flowering plants

The Cucurbitales are an order of flowering plants, included in the rosid group of dicotyledons. This order mostly belongs to tropical areas, with limited presence in subtropical and temperate regions. The order includes shrubs and trees, together with many herbs and climbers. One major characteristic of the Cucurbitales is the presence of unisexual flowers, mostly pentacyclic, with thick pointed petals (whenever present). The pollination is usually performed by insects, but wind pollination is also present (in Coriariaceae and Datiscaceae).

The order consists of roughly 3000 species in eight families. The largest families are Begoniaceae (begonia family) with around 2040 species and Cucurbitaceae (gourd family) with around 960 species. These two families include the only economically important plants. Specifically, the Cucurbitaceae (gourd family) include some food species, such as squash, pumpkin (both from Cucurbita), watermelon (Citrullus vulgaris), and cucumber and melons (Cucumis). The Begoniaceae are known for their horticultural species, of which there are over 130 with many more varieties.

== Overview ==
The Cucurbitales are an order of plants with a cosmopolitan distribution, particularly diverse in the tropics. Most are herbs, climber herbs, woody lianas or shrubs but some genera include canopy-forming evergreen lauroid trees. Members of the Cucurbitales form an important component of low to montane tropical forest with greater representation in terms of the number of species. Although not known with certainty the total number of species in the order, conservative estimates indicate about 2600 species worldwide, distributed in 109 genera. Compared to other flowering plant orders, the taxonomy is poorly understood due to their great diversity, difficulty in identification, and limited study.

The order Cucurbitales in the eurosid I clade comprises almost 2600 species in 109 or 110 genera in eight families, tropical and temperate, of very different sizes, morphology, and ecology. It is a case of divergent evolution. In contrast, there is convergent evolution with other groups not related due to ecological or physical drivers toward a similar solution, including analogous structures. Some species are trees that have similar foliage to the true laurels due to convergent evolution.

The patterns of speciation in the Cucurbitales are diversified in a high number of species. They have a pantropical distribution with centers of diversity in Africa, South America, and Southeast Asia. They most likely originated in West Gondwana 67–107 million years ago, so the oldest split could relate to the break-up of Gondwana in the middle Eocene to late Oligocene, 45–24 million years ago. The group reached their current distribution by multiple intercontinental dispersal events. One factor was product of aridification, other groups responded to favorable climatic periods and expanded across the available habitat, occurring as opportunistic species across wide distribution; other groups diverged over long periods within isolated areas.

The Cucurbitales comprise the families: Apodanthaceae, Anisophylleaceae, Begoniaceae, Coriariaceae, Corynocarpaceae, Cucurbitaceae, Tetramelaceae, and Datiscaceae. Some of the synapomorphies of the order are: leaves in spiral with secondary veins palmated, calyx or perianth valvate, and the elevated stomatal calyx/perianth bearing separate styles. The two whorls are similar in texture.

Tetrameles nudiflora is a tree of immense proportions of height and width; Tetramelaceae, Anisophylleaceae, and Corynocarpaceae are tall canopy trees in temperate and tropical forests. The genus Dendrosicyos, with the only species being the cucumber tree, is adapted to the arid semidesert island of Socotra. Deciduous perennial Cucurbitales lose all of their leaves for part of the year depending on variations in rainfall. The leaf loss coincides with the dry season in tropical, subtropical and arid regions. In temperate or polar climates, the dry season is due to the inability of the plant to absorb water available in the form of ice. Apodanthaceae are obligatory endoparasites that only emerge once a year in the form of small flowers that develop into small berries, however taxonomists have not agreed on the exact placement of this family within the Cucurbitales. Over half of the known members of this order belong to the greatly diverse begonia family Begoniaceae, with around 1500 species in two genera. Before modern DNA-molecular classifications, some Cucurbitales species were assigned to orders as diverse as Ranunculales, Malpighiales, Violales, and Rafflesiales. Early molecular studies revealed several surprises, such as the nonmonophyly of the traditional Datiscaceae, including Tetrameles and Octomeles, but the exact relationships among the families remain unclear. The lack of knowledge about the order in general is due to many species being found in countries with limited economic means or unstable political environments, factors unsuitable for plant collection and detailed study. Thus the vast majority of species remain poorly determined, and a future increase in the number of species is expected.

== Etymology ==
The name Cucurbitales originates from the Latin word cucurbita, meaning "gourd."

== Classification ==
Under the Cronquist system, the families Begoniaceae, Cucurbitaceae, and Datiscaceae were placed in the order Violales, within the subclass Dilleniidae, with the Tetramelaceae subsumed into the Datiscaceae. Corynocarpaceae was placed in order Celastrales, and Anisophylleaceae in order Rosales, both under subclass Rosidae. Coriariaceae was placed in Ranunculaceae, subclass Magnoliidae. Apodanthaceae was not recognised as a family, its genera being assigned to another parasitic plant family, the Rafflesiaceae. The present classification is due to APG III (2009).

== Systematics ==
Modern molecular phylogenetics suggest the following relationships:

- - Fagales (outgroup)
  - Cucurbitales
    - Apodanthaceae
    - - Anisophylleaceae
      - - - Corynocarpaceae
          - Coriariaceae
        - Cucurbitaceae
        - - Tetramelaceae
          - - Datiscaceae
            - Begoniaceae
