= Semecarpus impressicostatus =

Conservation status
- Endangered (IUCN 3.1)

Scientific classification
- Kingdom: Plantae
- Clade: Embryophytes
- Clade: Tracheophytes
- Clade: Angiosperms
- Clade: Eudicots
- Clade: Rosids
- Order: Sapindales
- Family: Anacardiaceae
- Genus: Semecarpus
- Species: S. impressicostatus

Binomial name
- Semecarpus impressicostatus Kochummen

Species of flowering plant

Semecarpus impressicostatus is a flowering plant in the family Anacardiaceae. It is native to Borneo.

== Description ==
Semecarpus impressicostatus grows as a tree up to 20 m (70 ft) tall, with a stem diameter of up to 10 cm (4 in). The leathery leaves are oblanceolate and measure up to 85 cm (33 in) long and to 22 cm (9 in) wide. The inflorescences, with woolly bracts, feature black-veined flowers. The oblong fruits measure up to 1.7 cm (0.7 in) long.

== Taxonomy ==
Semecarpus impressicostatus was described by Malaysian botanist Kizhakkedathu Mathai Kochummen in Sandakania in 1996. The type specimen was collected in Tongod in Sabah, Borneo. The specific epithet impressicostatus means 'sunken vein', referring to the surface of the leaf.

== Distribution and habitat ==
Semecarpus impressicostatus is endemic to Borneo, where it is confined to Sabah. Its habitat is in lowland forests.

== Conservation ==
Semecarpus impressicostatus has been assessed as endangered on the IUCN Red List. It is threatened by forest fires and by conversion of its habitat for plantations. However the species is present in two protected areas: Bidu-Bidu Forest Reserve and Gunung Tinkar Forest Reserve.
