= Semecarpus pulvinatus =

Conservation status
- Endangered (IUCN 3.1)

Scientific classification
- Kingdom: Plantae
- Clade: Embryophytes
- Clade: Tracheophytes
- Clade: Angiosperms
- Clade: Eudicots
- Clade: Rosids
- Order: Sapindales
- Family: Anacardiaceae
- Genus: Semecarpus
- Species: S. pulvinatus

Binomial name
- Semecarpus pulvinatus Kochummen

Species of flowering plant

Semecarpus pulvinatus is a flowering plant in the family Anacardiaceae. It is native to Borneo.

== Description ==
Semecarpus pulvinatus grows as a tree up to 8 m (30 ft) tall, with a stem diameter of up to 20 cm (8 in). The grey bark is smooth. The brown twigs are fissured. The leaves are oblanceolate to elliptic and measure up to 30 cm (12 in) long and to 6.5 cm (2.6 in) wide. The inflorescences are in panicles. The roundish fruits measure up to 1.5 cm (0.6 in) long.

== Taxonomy ==
Semecarpus pulvinatus was described by Malaysian botanist Kizhakkedathu Mathai Kochummen in Sandakania in 1996. The type specimen was collected in Kinabatangan in Sabah, Borneo. The specific epithet pulvinatus means 'cushion-shaped', referring to the base of the petiole.

== Distribution and habitat ==
Semecarpus pulvinatus is endemic to Borneo, where it is confined to Deramakot and Sungai Tiagau Forest Reserves in Sabah. Its habitat is in lowland forests, at about 300 m (1,000 ft) elevation.

== Conservation ==
Semecarpus pulvinatus has been assessed as endangered on the IUCN Red List. It is threatened by conversion of its habitat for agriculture and by forest fires. While the species is present in forest reserves, Deramakot Forest Reserve is now part of a commercial forest and Sungai Tiagau Forest Reserve is fragmented.
