= Semecarpus kinabaluensis =

Conservation status
- Endangered (IUCN 3.1)

Scientific classification
- Kingdom: Plantae
- Clade: Tracheophytes
- Clade: Angiosperms
- Clade: Eudicots
- Clade: Rosids
- Order: Sapindales
- Family: Anacardiaceae
- Genus: Semecarpus
- Species: S. kinabaluensis

Binomial name
- Semecarpus kinabaluensis Kochummen

Species of flowering plant

Semecarpus kinabaluensis is a flowering plant in the family Anacardiaceae. It is native to Borneo.

== Description ==
Semecarpus kinabaluensis grows as a tree up to 10 m (30 ft) tall. The fissured twigs are brown to grey. The leaves are obovate and measure up to 37.5 cm (15 in) long and 15.5 cm (6.1 in) wide. The inflorescences, in panicles feature yellow flowers. The roundish fruits measure up to 1.3 cm (0.5 in) long.

== Taxonomy ==
Semecarpus kinabaluensis was described by Malaysian botanist Kizhakkedathu Mathai Kochummen in Sandakania in 1996. The type specimen was collected in Kinabalu Park in Sabah, Borneo. The specific epithet kinabaluensis refers to Mount Kinabalu.

== Distribution and habitat ==
Semecarpus kinabaluensis is endemic to Borneo, where it is confined to the area of Mount Kinabalu in Sabah, including Tenompok Forest Reserve. Its habitat is in lower montane forests, at elevations of 1,200–1,800 m (4,000–6,000 ft).

== Conservation ==
Semecarpus kinabaluensis has been assessed as endangered on the IUCN Red List. It is threatened by changes in land use, as the forests of its habitat are converted for agriculture and urban development. The species is present in two protected areas, Kinabalu Park and Tenompok Forest Reserve.
