= Varnish tree =

The name varnish tree may refer to numerous species of tree:

- The candlenut, or kukui (Aleurites moluccanus)
- The goldenrain tree (Koelreuteria paniculata)
- The marking nut tree (Semecarpus anacardium)
- The Chinese lacquer tree (Toxicodendron vernicifluum)
