= Semecarpus euodiifolius =

Conservation status
- Critically Endangered (IUCN 3.1)

Scientific classification
- Kingdom: Plantae
- Clade: Embryophytes
- Clade: Tracheophytes
- Clade: Angiosperms
- Clade: Eudicots
- Clade: Rosids
- Order: Sapindales
- Family: Anacardiaceae
- Genus: Semecarpus
- Species: S. euodiifolius

Binomial name
- Semecarpus euodiifolius Kochummen

Species of flowering plant

Semecarpus euodiifolius is a flowering plant in the family Anacardiaceae. It is endemic to Borneo.

== Description ==
Semecarpus euodiifolius grows as a tree up to 23 m (80 ft) tall, with a trunk diameter of up to 20 cm (8 in). The smooth bark is brown. The leathery leaves are oblong or elliptic and measure up to 19.5 cm (8 in) long and to 6.5 cm (2.6 in) wide. The inflorescences, in clusters or panicles, may feature male and female flowers on the same inflorescence, and measure up to 16 cm (6 in) long. The round fruits are hairy and measure up to 1.5 cm (0.6 in) in diameter.

== Taxonomy ==
Semecarpus euodiifolius was described by Malaysian botanist Kizhakkedathu Mathai Kochummen in Sandakania in 1996. The type specimen was collected in Beaufort District in Sabah, Borneo. The specific epithet euodiifolius means 'Euodia leaf', referring to the leaves' resemblance to those of the genus Euodia.

== Distribution and habitat ==
Semecarpus euodiifolius is endemic to Borneo, where it is known only from Sabah. Its habitat is in lowland forests, at elevations of 10–100 m (30–330 ft).

== Conservation ==
Semecarpus euodiifolius has been assessed as critically endangered on the IUCN Red List. Its habitat is at risk of conversion to palm oil plantations and for agriculture. Forest fires are also a risk. The species is present in Gunung Lumaku Forest Reserve, a totally protected area.
