= Semecarpus calcicola =

Conservation status
- Vulnerable (IUCN 3.1)

Scientific classification
- Kingdom: Plantae
- Clade: Embryophytes
- Clade: Tracheophytes
- Clade: Angiosperms
- Clade: Eudicots
- Clade: Rosids
- Order: Sapindales
- Family: Anacardiaceae
- Genus: Semecarpus
- Species: S. calcicola

Binomial name
- Semecarpus calcicola Kochummen

Species of flowering plant

Semecarpus calcicola is a flowering plant in the family Anacardiaceae. It is native to Borneo.

== Description ==
Semecarpus calcicola grows as a tree up to 15 m (50 ft) tall, with a trunk diameter of up to 20 cm (8 in). The bark is white to grey. The leaves are oblanceolate and measure up to 34 cm (13 in) long and 8.5 cm (3.3 in) wide. The oblong fruits measure up to 2.5 cm (1 in) long.

== Taxonomy ==
Semecarpus calcicola was described by Malaysian botanist Kizhakkedathu Mathai Kochummen in Sandakania in 1996. The type specimen was collected on Mantanani Besar Island, off the coast of Kota Belud District in Sabah, Borneo. The specific epithet calcicola means 'chalk dweller', referring to the species' habitat.

== Distribution and habitat ==
Semecarpus calcicola is endemic to Borneo, where it is confined to Mantanani Besar Island off Sabah. Its habitat is on limestone formations.

== Conservation ==
Semecarpus calcicola has been assessed as vulnerable on the IUCN Red List. It is threatened by changes in land use, climate change and tsunamis. Mantanani Besar Island is not currently a protected area.
