= Semecarpus angulatus =

Conservation status
- Critically endangered, possibly extinct (IUCN 3.1)

Scientific classification
- Kingdom: Plantae
- Clade: Tracheophytes
- Clade: Angiosperms
- Clade: Eudicots
- Clade: Rosids
- Order: Sapindales
- Family: Anacardiaceae
- Genus: Semecarpus
- Species: S. angulatus

Binomial name
- Semecarpus angulatus Kochummen

Species of flowering plant

Semecarpus angulatus is a flowering plant in the family Anacardiaceae. It is native to Borneo.

== Description ==
Semecarpus angulatus grows as a tree up to 6 m (20 ft) tall, with a stem diameter of up to 5 cm (2 in). It has brown to grey twigs. The leathery leaves are lanceolate and measure up to 31.5 cm (12 in) long and to 12.5 cm (4.9 in) wide. The inflorescences are in clusters and measure up to 19 cm (7.5 in) long.

== Taxonomy ==
Semecarpus angulatus was described by Malaysian botanist Kizhakkedathu Mathai Kochummen in Sandakania in 1996. The type specimen was collected in Kalabakan District, Borneo. The specific epithet angulatus means 'angular', referring to the axes of the inflorescence.

== Distribution and habitat ==
Semecarpus angulatus is endemic to Borneo, where it is known only from Kalabakan District of Sabah. Its habitat is in lowland dipterocarp forests, at elevations of 150–170 m (500–600 ft).

== Conservation ==
Semecarpus angulatus has been assessed as critically endangered (possibly extinct) on the IUCN Red List. Much of its habitat has been converted to palm oil plantations. It is not known to be present in any protected areas.
