= Semecarpus cupularis =

Conservation status
- Endangered (IUCN 3.1)

Scientific classification
- Kingdom: Plantae
- Clade: Embryophytes
- Clade: Tracheophytes
- Clade: Angiosperms
- Clade: Eudicots
- Clade: Rosids
- Order: Sapindales
- Family: Anacardiaceae
- Genus: Semecarpus
- Species: S. cupularis

Binomial name
- Semecarpus cupularis Kochummen

Species of flowering plant

Semecarpus cupularis is a flowering plant in the family Anacardiaceae. It is native to Borneo.

== Description ==
Semecarpus cupularis grows as a tree up to 10 m (33 ft) tall, with a stem diameter of up to 10 cm (4 in). It has yellowish, fissured twigs. The leaves are obovate and measure up to 52 cm (20 in) long and to 19 cm (7.5 in) wide. The green fruits ripen orange and measure up to 2 cm (0.8 in) long.

== Taxonomy ==
Semecarpus cupularis was described by Malaysian botanist Kizhakkedathu Mathai Kochummen in Sandakania in 1996. The type specimen was collected in Kapit in Sarawak, Borneo. The specific epithet cupularis means 'cup-shaped', referring to the hypanthium of the flower.

== Distribution and habitat ==
Semecarpus cupularis is endemic to Borneo, where it is confined to Sarawak. Its habitat is in lowland forest, at elevations of 250–300 m (800–1,000 ft).

== Conservation ==
Semecarpus cupularis has been assessed as endangered on the IUCN Red List. It is threatened by logging and conversion of its habitat for plantations. It is not known to be present in any protected areas.
