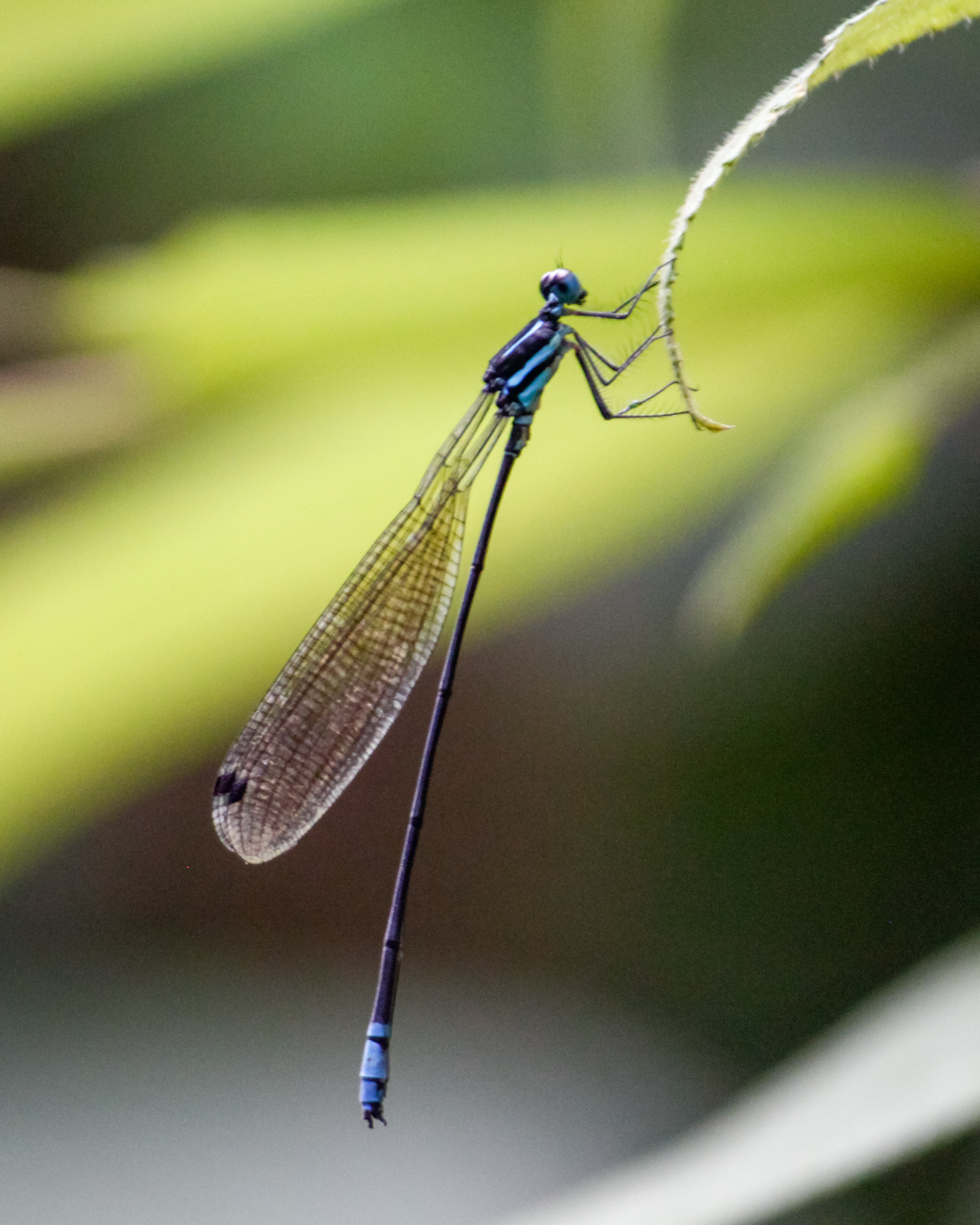
- Male

Conservation status
- Near Threatened (IUCN 3.1)

Scientific classification
- Kingdom: Animalia
- Phylum: Arthropoda
- Clade: Pancrustacea
- Class: Insecta
- Order: Odonata
- Suborder: Zygoptera
- Superfamily: Coenagrionoidea
- Family: Platycnemididae
- Subfamily: Disparoneurinae
- Genus: Phylloneura
- Species: P. westermanni

Binomial name
- Phylloneura westermanni (Hagen in Selys, 1860)

Synonyms
- Alloneura westermanni Hagen in Selys, 1860

= Phylloneura westermanni =

Species of damselfly

Phylloneura westermanni, Myristica bambootail is a damselfly species in the family Platycnemididae. It is endemic to Myristica swamps of Western Ghats in India. The habitat is restricted to a few localities in Karnataka, Kerala and Tamil Nadu.

== Description and habitat ==
It is a medium-sized damselfly with black-capped blue eyes. Its thorax is black, marked with a narrow ante-humeral azure blue stripe. Lateral side is blue with a moderately broad black stripe over the postero-lateral suture. Its abdomen is black, marked with azure blue broadly on the sides of the segments 1 and 2. Segments 3 to 5 have very narrow baso-dorsal annules in blue. Apical end of segment 7 and segments 8 to 9 are blue on dorsum with very narrow annules in black. Segment 10 is blue on dorsum and black on the sides. Female is similar to the male except in the markings on the last abdominal segments.

The species is closely associated with Myristica swamps and streams with good riparian forest cover. They usually found in small colonies, perching on overhanging plants.

== See also ==
- List of odonates of India
- List of odonata of Kerala
