= Semecarpus trengganuensis =

Conservation status
- Vulnerable (IUCN 3.1)

Scientific classification
- Kingdom: Plantae
- Clade: Embryophytes
- Clade: Tracheophytes
- Clade: Angiosperms
- Clade: Eudicots
- Clade: Rosids
- Order: Sapindales
- Family: Anacardiaceae
- Genus: Semecarpus
- Species: S. trengganuensis

Binomial name
- Semecarpus trengganuensis Kochummen

Species of flowering plant

Semecarpus trengganuensis is a plant in the family Anacardiaceae. It is native to Malaysia.

== Description ==
Semecarpus trengganuensis grows as a shrub or tree, up to 5 m (16 ft) tall. The twigs are grey to brown. The leaves are obovoate to elliptic and measure up to 33 cm (13 in) long and 11 cm (4.3 in) wide. The inflorescences are in panicles. The oblong to roundish fruits measure up to 1.0 cm (0.4 in) long.

== Taxonomy ==
Semecarpus trengganuensis was described by Malaysian botanist Kizhakkedathu Mathai Kochummen in the Gardens' Bulletin Singapore in 1984. The type specimen was collected in Terengganu (formerly Trengganu) in Peninsular Malaysia, giving rise to the specific epithet trengganuensis.

== Distribution and habitat ==
Semecarpus trengganuensis is native to Peninsular Malaysia and Malaysian Borneo. Its habitat is in hill and lowland forests.

== Conservation ==
Semecarpus trengganuensis has been assessed as vulnerable on the IUCN Red List. It is threatened by nearby changes in land use and by local harvesting of forest species in general.
