= Dactylispa semecarpi =

Scientific classification
- Kingdom: Animalia
- Phylum: Arthropoda
- Class: Insecta
- Order: Coleoptera
- Suborder: Polyphaga
- Infraorder: Cucujiformia
- Family: Chrysomelidae
- Genus: Dactylispa
- Species: D. semecarpi

Binomial name
- Dactylispa semecarpi Gressitt, 1963

Species of beetle

Dactylispa semecarpi is a species of beetle of the family Chrysomelidae. It is found in north-western New Guinea (Biak).

== Description ==
Adults reach a length of about 5.2-5.8 mm. They are orange testaceous to black, with the head and prothorax pale orange ochraceous. The elytra are black with the base pitchy brown.

== Life history ==
The host plants for this species are thought to be Semecarpus species.
