= Semecarpus sandakanus =

Conservation status
- Critically endangered, possibly extinct (IUCN 3.1)

Scientific classification
- Kingdom: Plantae
- Clade: Embryophytes
- Clade: Tracheophytes
- Clade: Angiosperms
- Clade: Eudicots
- Clade: Rosids
- Order: Sapindales
- Family: Anacardiaceae
- Genus: Semecarpus
- Species: S. sandakanus

Binomial name
- Semecarpus sandakanus Kochummen

Species of flowering plant

Semecarpus sandakanus is a flowering plant in the family Anacardiaceae. It is native to Borneo.

== Description ==
Semecarpus sandakanus grows as a tree up to 5 m (16 ft) tall. It has grey, slender twigs. The leathery leaves are elliptic and measure up to 30.5 cm (12 in) long and to 10 cm (3.9 in) wide. The inflorescences, in panicles, measure up to 10 cm (4 in) long.

== Taxonomy ==
Semecarpus sandakanus was described by Malaysian botanist Kizhakkedathu Mathai Kochummen in Sandakania in 1996. The type specimen was collected in Sandakan District in Sabah, Borneo. The species is named for Sandakan.

== Distribution and habitat ==
Semecarpus sandakanus is endemic to Borneo, where it is known only from a single collection in Sandakan District. Its habitat is in lowland forest.

== Conservation ==
Semecarpus sandakanus has been assessed as critically endangered (possibly extinct) on the IUCN Red List. Its single habitat has been converted to a palm oil plantation and the species has not been encountered since 1977. It is not known to be present in any protected areas.
