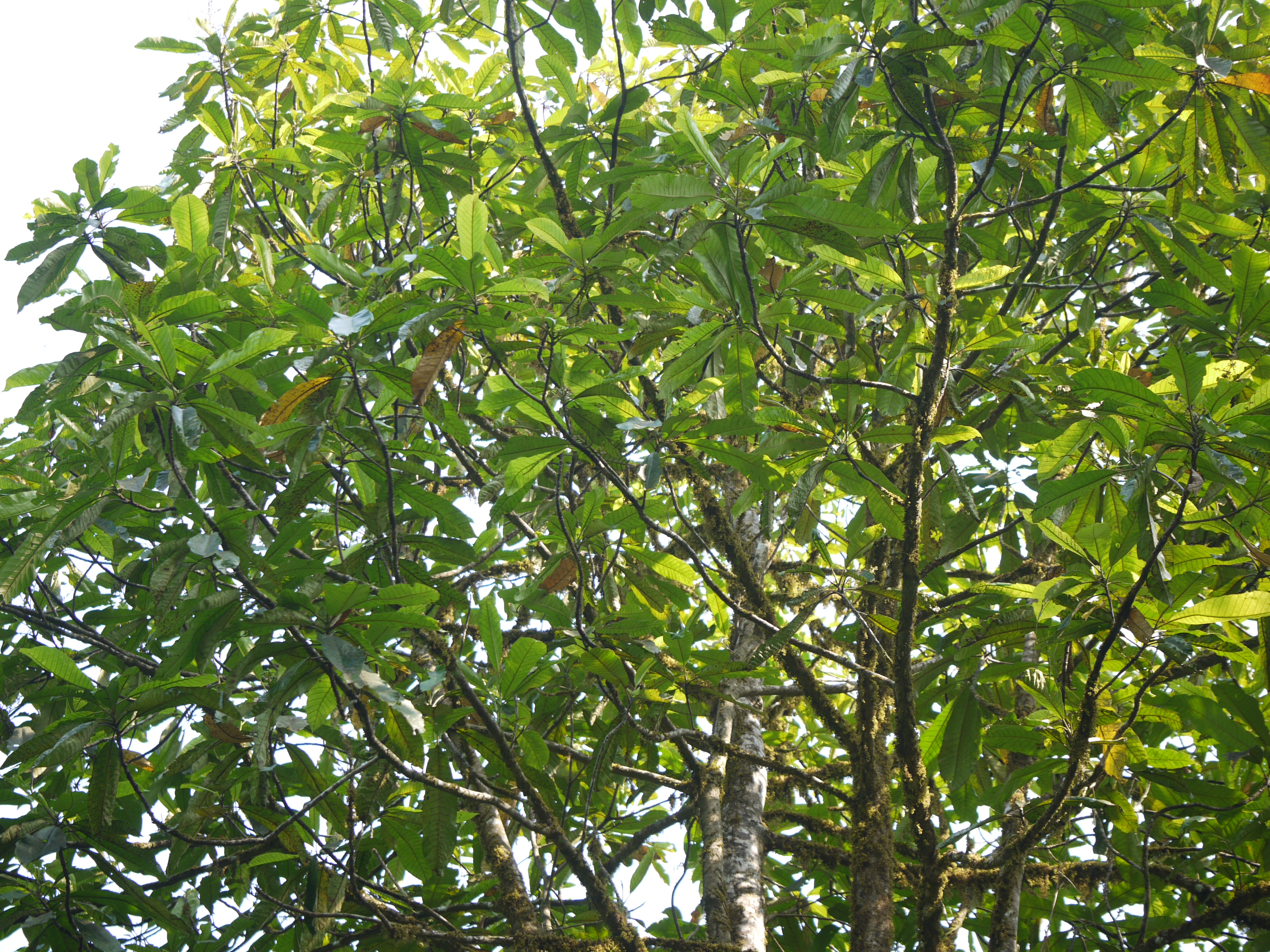

Conservation status
- Critically Endangered (IUCN 3.1)

Scientific classification
- Kingdom: Plantae
- Clade: Tracheophytes
- Clade: Angiosperms
- Clade: Eudicots
- Clade: Rosids
- Order: Sapindales
- Family: Anacardiaceae
- Genus: Semecarpus
- Species: S. kathalekanensis

Binomial name
- Semecarpus kathalekanensis Dasappa & Swaminath, 2016

= Semecarpus kathalekanensis =

Species of plants

Semecarpus kathalekanensis is a critically endangered species of plant endemic to the Western Ghats of the states of Goa and Karnataka in India. It is also called Kathalekan marsh nut.

== Etymology ==
This species is named after Kathalekan, a small hamlet in Siddapur taluk of Uttara Kannada district in Karnataka that has Myristica swamp where the tree was found and described.

== Distribution and habitat ==
This species of tree were found from six localities inside the Myristica swamps of the Western ghats spreading across Karnataka and Goa.

== Description ==
The tree can grow up to 20 meters high. The bark is greyish brown. Leaves have leathery texture with oblique at the base and they are alternate with dark green in color above and pale green below. The petioles are 5-10 cm long. The flowers are mostly dioecious and unisexual with female flowers larger than the male. It usually have 4-5 sepals and petals. Flowers are green and fruit is fleshy with greyish color that turns into brown when ripened with a single kidney shaped seed inside. The flowering season is from November to May.

== Conservation and threats ==
A 2021 survey found that there were less than 120 mature individual trees found in the wild. Major threats for this species include road expansion, conversion of the swamp forests that host the trees into agriculture lands or plantations and diversion of the swamp water for agriculture.

This species are pollinated by Malabar nymph and seeds dispersal is done by lion-tailed macaque two endemic and endangered species. This combined with skewed seed sex ratio and specific fresh water swamp habitat needs adds to the challenges faced by this species.

A species conservation plan was attempted for this species where seeds from Sirsi were planted in Myristica swamps of Kerala. Some seeds were successfully grown in nursery and transferred to the natural habitats in Karnataka.
