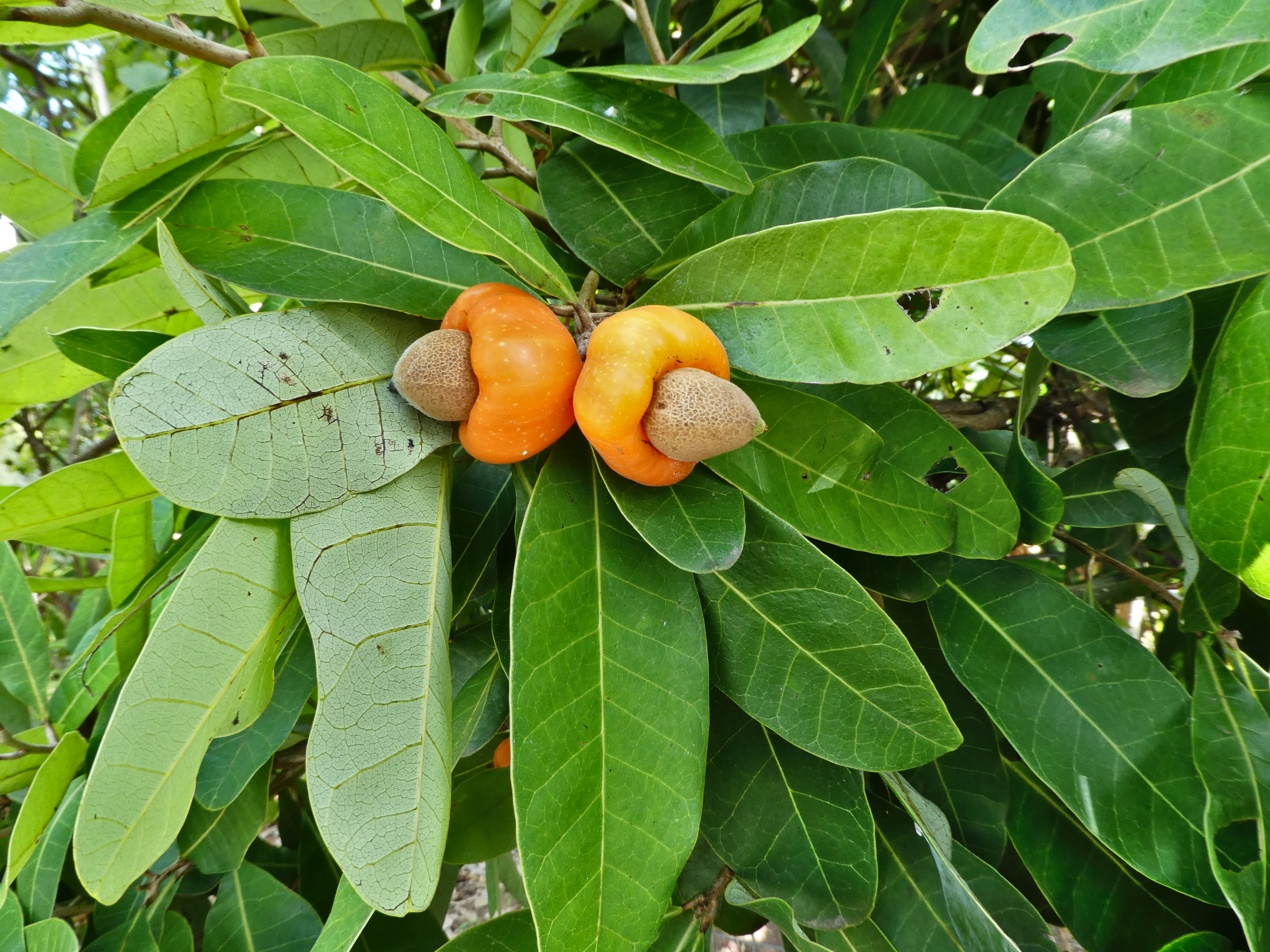
- Fruits and foliage

Conservation status
- Least Concern (IUCN 3.1)
- Least Concern (NCA)

Scientific classification
- Kingdom: Plantae
- Clade: Embryophytes
- Clade: Tracheophytes
- Clade: Spermatophytes
- Clade: Angiosperms
- Clade: Eudicots
- Clade: Rosids
- Order: Sapindales
- Family: Anacardiaceae
- Genus: Semecarpus
- Species: S. australiensis

Binomial name
- Semecarpus australiensis Engl.

Synonyms
- Cassuvium australiense (Engl.) Kuntze; Semecarpus anacardium var. parvifolius Benth.; Semecarpus australiensis var. macrophyllus Domin; Semecarpus australiensis var. obtusifolius Domin; Semecarpus congestiflorus K.Schum. & Lauterb.

= Semecarpus australiensis =

Tar tree

Species of flowering plant

Semecarpus australiensis, commonly known as the tar tree, native cashew, marking nut, or cedar plum, is a species of tree in the cashew and mango family Anacardiaceae, native to parts of Melanesia and northern Australia. Contact with the plant can cause serious allergic reactions, a common characteristic of this family.

== Description ==
The tar tree is a large rainforest tree up to 40 m (130 ft) in height. The trunk is generally straight and cylindrical, and marked with numerous oval-shaped lenticels arranged in more or less vertical lines. When cut or damaged the trunk and branches produce a tar-like exudate which turns black on exposure to the air.

The leaves are up to 30 cm (12 in) long by wide 12 cm (4.7 in) with prominent pale yellow veins. They are dark green and glabrous on the upper surface and chalky blue-green (glaucous) underneath.

The flowers are pentamerous and are quite small; petals on the male flowers are about 1.5 mm (0.059 in) long, while those on female flowers measure up to 4 mm (0.16 in) long. Flowering occurs in spring (September to November) and fruits are produced through the summer.

The fruits are a true nut attached beneath a colourful fleshy receptacle. To the casual observer it appears to be a "fruit" (the receptacle) with a "seed" (the nut) on the outside. The receptacle is actually the swollen flower stem or pedicel and is much larger than the nut (see images below). Neither are edible to humans in their raw state due to the presence of highly irritant resins.

== Taxonomy ==
Semecarpus australiensis was first described by the German botanist Adolf Engler. His treatment was published in volume 4 of Monographiae Phanerogamarum in 1883.

=== Etymology ===
The genus name Semecarpus is from the Latin semi-, meaning half, and the Ancient Greek κᾰρπός (karpós), meaning fruit. It is a reference to the appearance of the fruit. The species epithet means "from Australia".

== Distribution and habitat ==
The natural range of Semecarpus australiensis is from the Moluccas in the west, into New Guinea, the Bismark Archipelago, Vanuatu and New Caledonia in the east; and south to the coastal parts of the Northern Territory and Queensland in Australia.

It grows in lowland rainforest, monsoon forest and gallery forest, close to the sea or to water courses.

== Ecology ==
The fruits of this species are eaten by cassowaries (Casuarius casuarius) with no apparent adverse effects from the sap that is toxic to humans. The tree also serves as one of the host plants for the larvae of the Purple Line-blue butterfly (Prosotas dubiosa).

== Toxicity ==
Like many other species in the family Anacardiaceae, this tree may cause severe allergic responses after contact with it. The agents responsible for the allergies are resinous phenolic compounds found in most parts of the plant, including the fruits and the exudate from the trunk and branches. Direct contact with the tree is not necessary to elicit the allergic response; in March 1954, an article appeared in the local newspaper in Cairns, Australia, describing how a number of children suffered rashes after swimming in a stream beneath a tar tree.

== Indigenous uses ==
Indigenous Australians were are aware of the toxic nature of this plant, and kept their children away from it. They also knew that the fleshy receptacle and the nut (which is similar to the cashew) were edible, and they developed methods of deactivating the toxins so that they could be eaten. These included covering the hands with clay before handling the plant, and roasting the nuts in a fire. Even the smoke from the fire can cause problems, and they were careful to prepare the food well away from their camp.

== Gallery ==
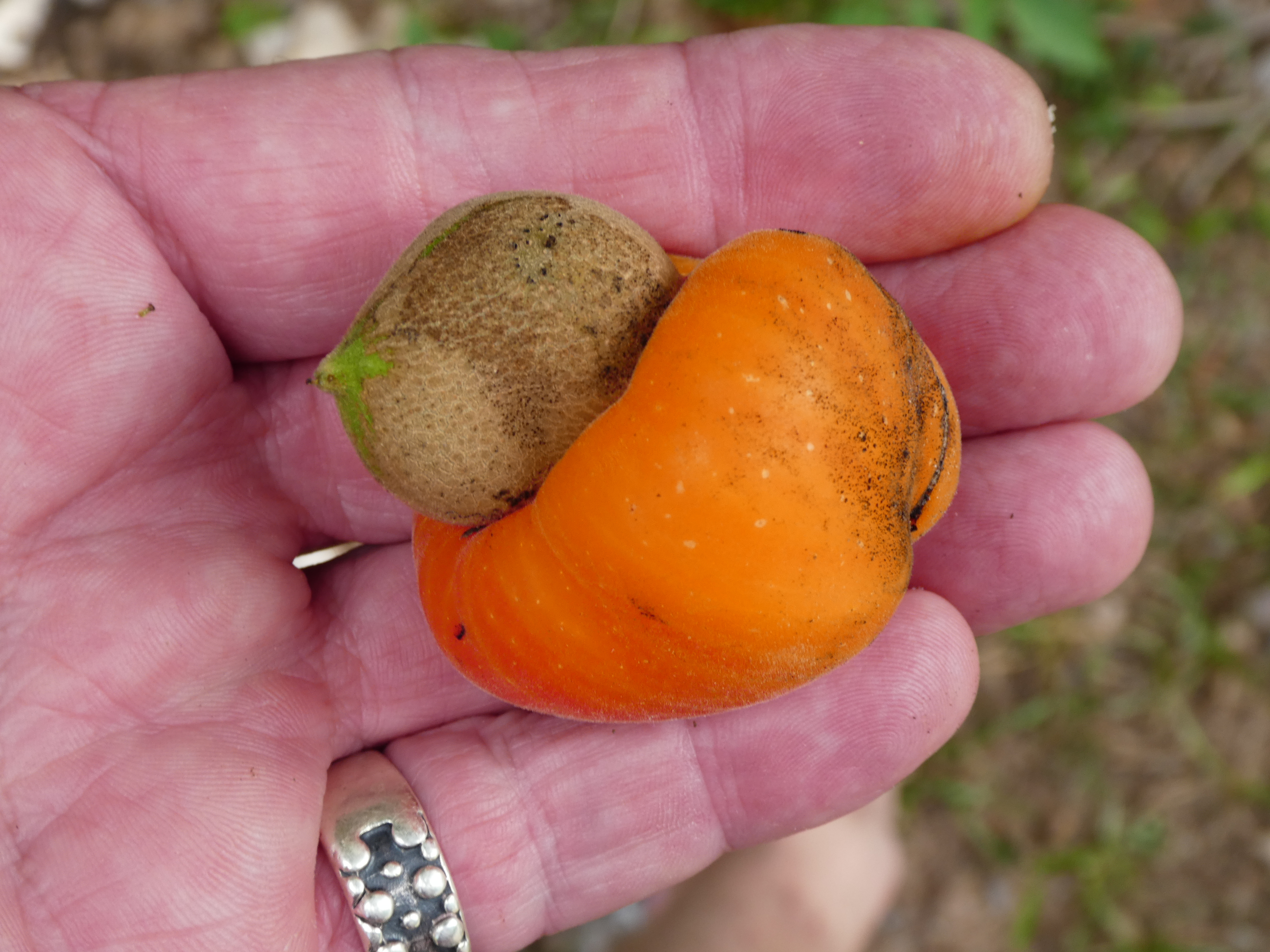
Mature fruit

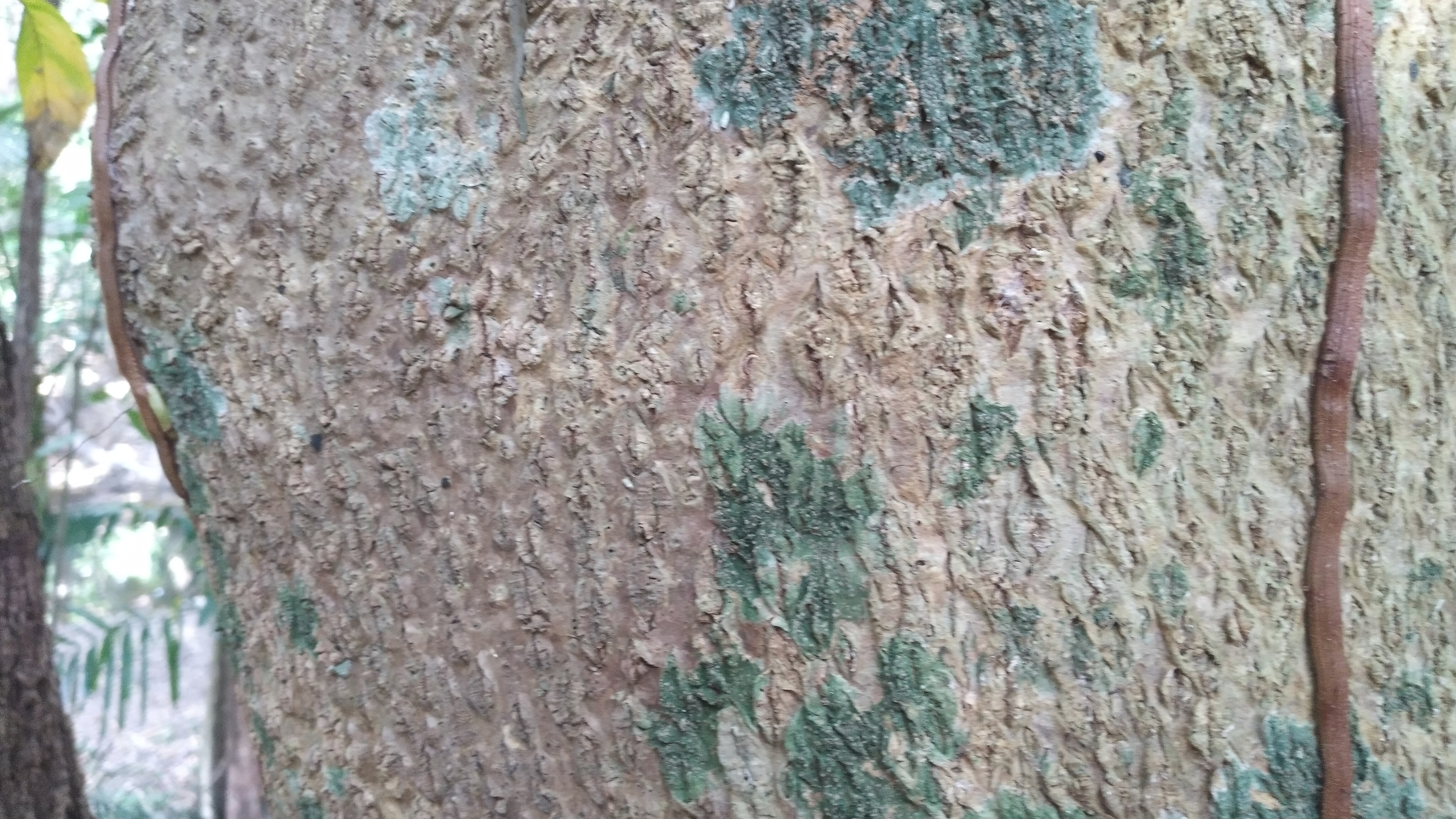
Detail of trunk

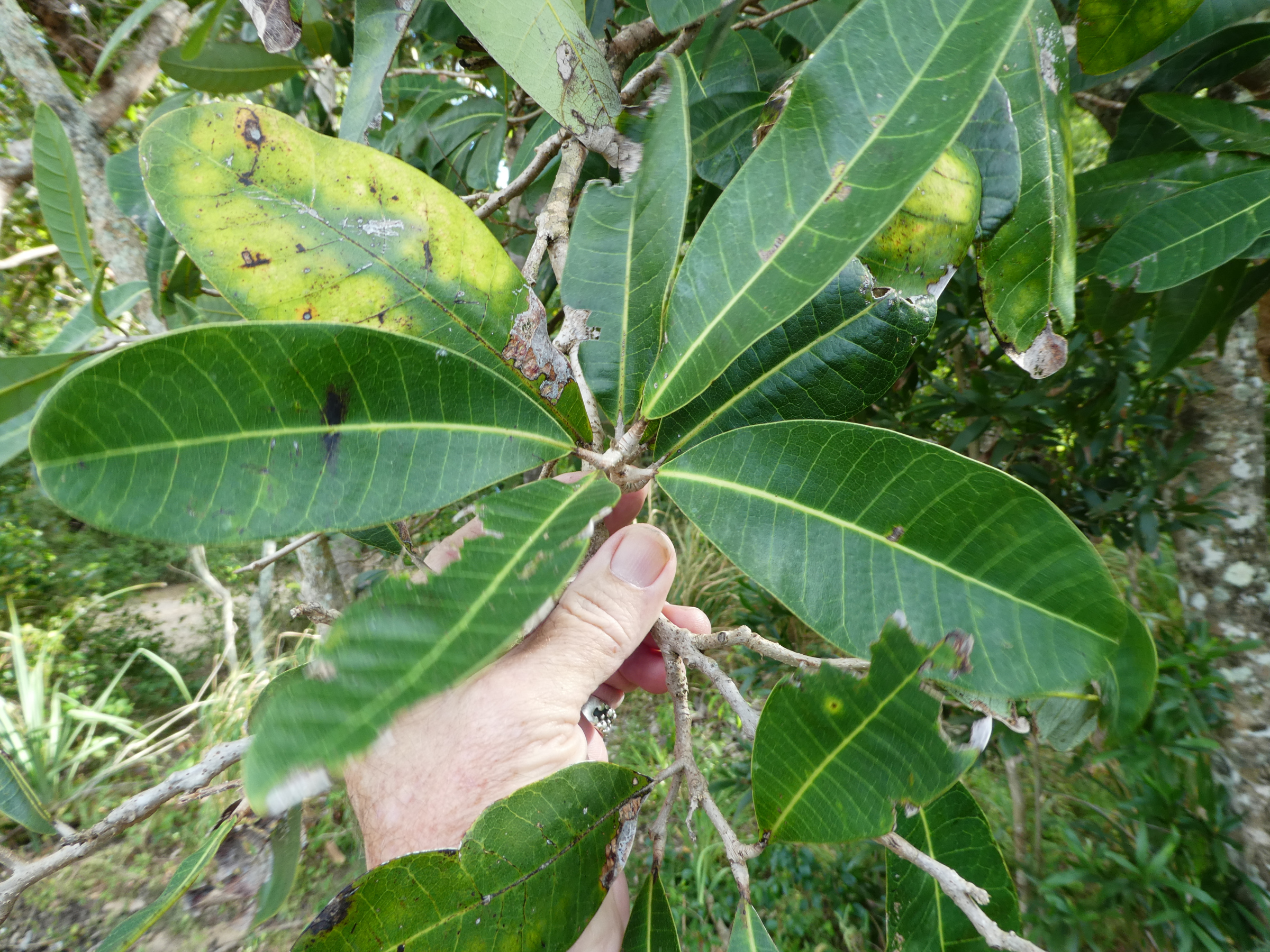
Foliage

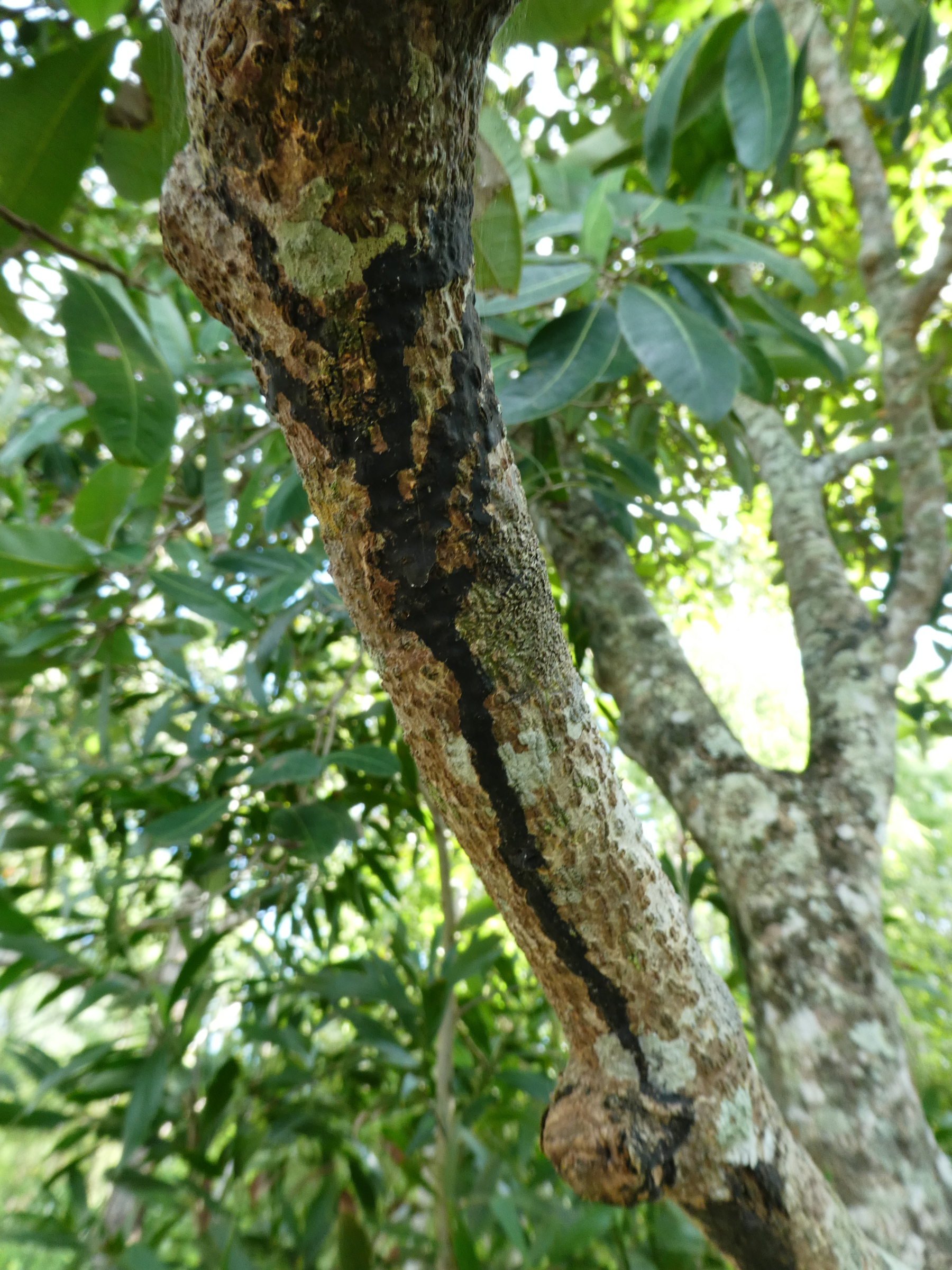
Branch with black exudate
