= Krus na Ligas =

Barangay in Quezon City, Metro Manila, Philippines

Krus na Ligas Cruz Na Ligas
- Barangay
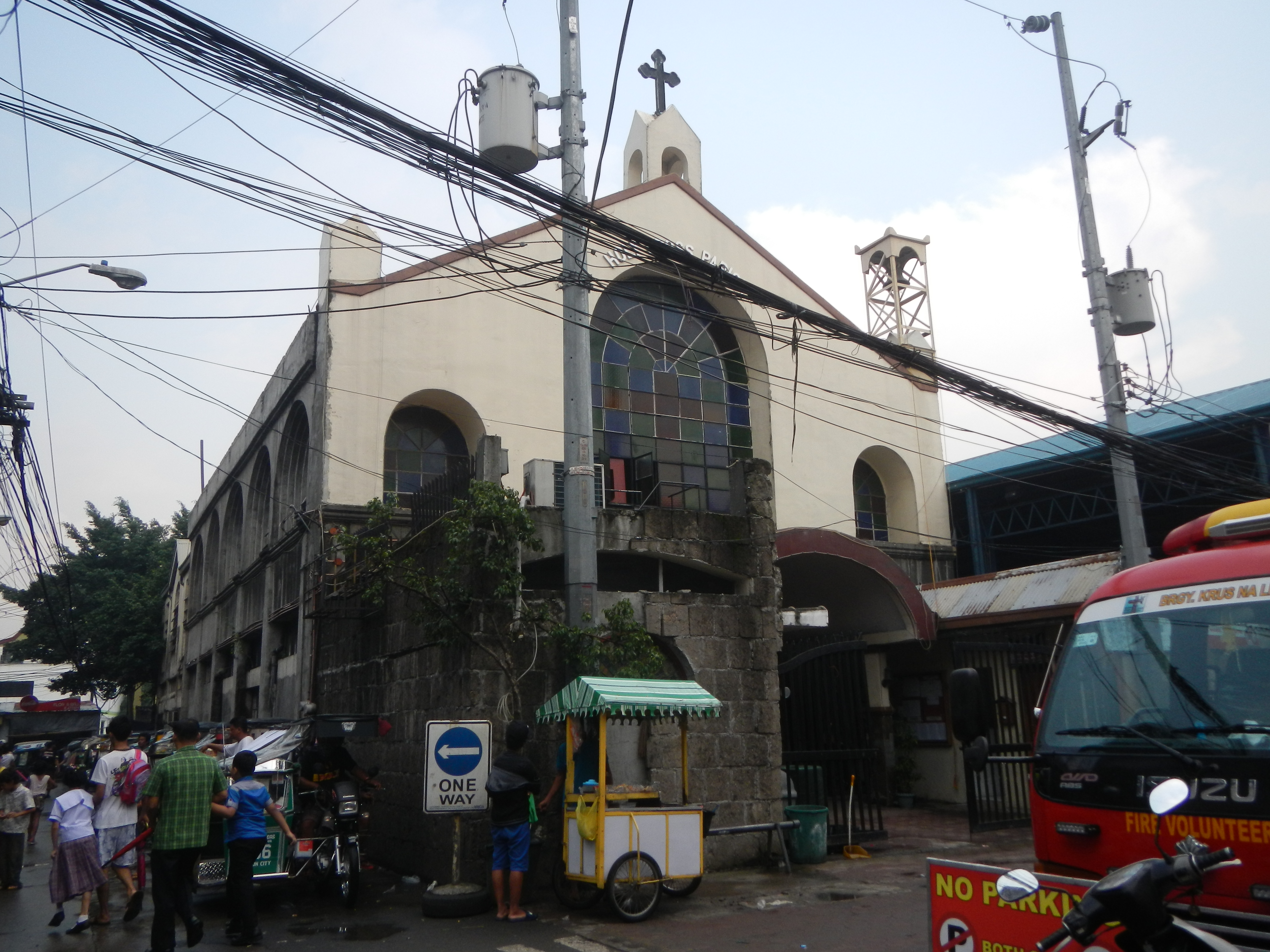
- Holy Cross Parish
- Nickname: KNL
- Interactive map of Krus na Ligas
- Location in Metro Manila
- Coordinates: 14°38′39″N 121°03′49″E
- Country: Philippines
- Region: National Capital Region
- City: Quezon City
- District: 4th District of Quezon City

Government
  - Type: Barangay
  - Barangay Captain: Renz Perdido

Population (2020)
  - Total: 21,287
- Time zone: UTC+8 (PST)
- Postal Code: 1101
- Area code: 02

Krus na Ligas is a barangay in Diliman, Quezon City in the Philippines. It is located within the premises of the University of the Philippines Diliman. It has a population of 21,287 based on the census conducted in 2020.

== History ==
Krus na Ligas was founded in the 17th century by Marikina townsfolk who settled in the hilly area to cultivate the land. The residents initially called their community Gulod (Tagalog for hilltop). It became a visita of Marikina, and as popular folklore has it, a small chapel was built near a cross-shaped marking nut tree known in Tagalog as ligas that gave the place its current name. This was first recorded in 1705 with 30 families residing in the community.

After the Battle of Pasong Tamo on 26 August 1896, during the Philippine Revolution against Spain, Andres Bonifacio, Emilio Jacinto, Guillermo Masangkay, Pio Valenzuela and other Katipuneros camped in Krus na Ligas and met in one of the houses fronting Plaza Santa Inez before heading to San Juan del Monte.

In 1939, Krus na Ligas together with the barrios of Balara, Diliman, Barangka, and Jesus de la Peña were separated from Marikina to form part of Quezon City. Jesus de la Peña and Barangka would later be reverted to Marikina. On April 2, 1949, a vast tract of public land which tilled by residents of the surrounding communities including Krus na Ligas was authorized by President Elpidio Quirino to be sold to the University of the Philippines for one peso, for it to build its new campus outside of Manila. Significant portions of the farmlands of Krus na Ligas would be turned into government housing projects that would be latter known as Sikatuna Village, UP Village and Teacher's Village. Despite the growth the university campus, sections of Krus na Ligas remained farmlands well into the 1990s, until the remaining farmland was used for a housing project for university personnel, displacing the last farmers in the area.

=== Land dispute ===
The inclusion of the settlement of Krus na Ligas into the UP Diliman campus effectively turned the residents of the barrio into illegal settlers. This resulted in several court cases attempting to secure legitimate ownership of the land the residents claim to have been in their family for generations, long before UP Diliman was even established. Attempts to settle land ownership between the residents and several UP Administrations have repeatedly failed. During the administration of Edgardo Angara as UP President, an agreement was reached to donate 15.8379 hectares of land to the Quezon City government—acting as trustee of the residents—in exchange for the removal of structures on the boundary of the university and the community of Krus na Ligas; construction of a fence to demarcate such boundary; and relocation of families living on the university side of the boundary. However, the failure of the residents to fulfill the specified conditions caused the revocation of the donation.

In 2008, the new charter of the University of the Philippines was passed by Congress prohibiting the sale of any of its land. Attempts to allow the legitimate residents of Krus na Ligas to finally attain ownership of their land was then sought through an amendment of the university's charter. In September 2019, Republic Act No. 11454 was made into law. This law included amendments to aforesaid charter to allow the sale of some portions of the land, subject to conditions. It remains to be seen how the law and land distribution will be implemented.

Despite the dispute, Krus Na Ligas remains to be a very important residential community for UP students and employees.

== Government ==
Barangay Captain: Reniel John Perdido (Renz Perdido)

Kagawad: Patria Uchi

Kagawad: Willy Fulgencio

Kagawad: Arlene Montiano

Kagawad: Airene Dela Cruz

Kagawad: Jessie Virtucio

Kagawad: Felix Cuevas

== Education ==
Krus Na Ligas Elementary School (KNLES)

Krus Na Ligas Jr. High School (KNLHS)
