= Mangifera khoonmengiana =

Conservation status
- Endangered (IUCN 3.1)

Scientific classification
- Kingdom: Plantae
- Clade: Embryophytes
- Clade: Tracheophytes
- Clade: Angiosperms
- Clade: Eudicots
- Clade: Rosids
- Order: Sapindales
- Family: Anacardiaceae
- Genus: Mangifera
- Species: M. khoonmengiana

Binomial name
- Mangifera khoonmengiana Kochummen

Species of flowering plant

Mangifera khoonmengiana is a flowering plant in the family Anacardiaceae. It is native to Borneo.

== Description ==
Mangifera khoonmengiana grows as a tree up to 30 m (100 ft) tall with a trunk diameter of up to 40 cm (16 in). The brown bark is smooth or somewhat fissured. The leathery leaves are oblong or elliptic and measure up to 20 cm (8 in) long and up to 9.5 cm (4 in) wide. The inflorescences, in panicles, feature cream-coloured to greenish flowers. The fruits are green, drying to brown, and measure up to 3.5 cm (1.4 in) wide.

== Taxonomy ==
Mangifera khoonmengiana was first described by Malaysian botanist Kizhakkedathu Mathai Kochummen in 1996. The type specimen was collected in Brunei. The specific epithet khoonmengiana honours the Malaysian botanist Khoon Meng Wong.

== Distribution and habitat ==
Mangifera khoonmengiana is endemic to Borneo, where it is confined to Brunei and Sarawak. Its habitat is in lowland forests, including in swamps.

== Conservation ==
Mangifera khoonmengiana has been assessed as endangered on the IUCN Red List. The species' habitat is threatened by deforestation and conversion of land for plantations and agriculture. In Sarawak, the species is confined to Lambir Hills National Park, affording it some protection.
