= Semecarpus forstenii =

Scientific classification
- Kingdom: Plantae
- Clade: Tracheophytes
- Clade: Angiosperms
- Clade: Eudicots
- Clade: Rosids
- Order: Sapindales
- Family: Anacardiaceae
- Genus: Semecarpus
- Species: S. forstenii

Binomial name
- Semecarpus forstenii Blume

Species of tree

Semecarpus forstenii is a species of tree in the family Anacardiaceae. It is found in Indonesia, Papua New Guinea, and the Solomon Islands. The tree's sap is poisonous.

== Names ==
S. forstenii is reconstructed as *lapuka in the Proto-Malayo-Polynesian language, the reconstructed ancestor of the Malayo-Polynesian languages.
