= Semecarpus reticulatus =

Scientific classification
- Kingdom: Plantae
- Clade: Embryophytes
- Clade: Tracheophytes
- Clade: Spermatophytes
- Clade: Angiosperms
- Clade: Eudicots
- Clade: Rosids
- Order: Sapindales
- Family: Anacardiaceae
- Subfamily: Anacardioideae
- Genus: Semecarpus
- Species: S. reticulatus

Binomial name
- Semecarpus reticulatus Lecomte

Synonyms
- Semecarpus reticulata Lecomte

Species of tree

Semecarpus reticulatus (a.k.a. S. reticulata) is a tree species in the family Anacardiaceae. It can be found in China (Yunnan), Laos, northern Thailand and Viet Nam (where it may be called sựng mạng); no subspecies are listed in the Catalogue of Life.
