= Semecarpus coriaceus =

Conservation status
- Endangered (IUCN 2.3)

Scientific classification
- Kingdom: Plantae
- Clade: Tracheophytes
- Clade: Angiosperms
- Clade: Eudicots
- Clade: Rosids
- Order: Sapindales
- Family: Anacardiaceae
- Genus: Semecarpus
- Species: S. coriaceus

Binomial name
- Semecarpus coriaceus Thwaites

Species of flowering plant

Semecarpus coriaceus is a species of plant in the family Anacardiaceae. It is endemic to Sri Lanka. The specific epithet was originally spelt coriacea.
