= Semecarpus rufovelutinus =

Conservation status
- Least Concern (IUCN 3.1)

Scientific classification
- Kingdom: Plantae
- Clade: Tracheophytes
- Clade: Angiosperms
- Clade: Eudicots
- Clade: Rosids
- Order: Sapindales
- Family: Anacardiaceae
- Genus: Semecarpus
- Species: S. rufovelutinus

Binomial name
- Semecarpus rufovelutinus Ridl.

Synonyms
- Melanocommia borneensis Ridl.

Species of flowering plant

Semecarpus rufovelutinus is a flowering plant in the family Anacardiaceae. It is native to Southeast Asia.

== Description ==
Semecarpus rufovelutinus grows as a tree up to 10 m (33 ft) tall, with a stem diameter up to 10 cm (4 in). The grey bark is smooth. The leaves are obovate, oblong or elliptic and measure up to 32 cm (13 in) long and 11 cm (4 in) wide. The inflorescences, in panicles, measure up to 34 cm (13 in) long. The velvety fruits are roundish and measure up to 1.7 cm (0.7 in) long.

== Taxonomy ==
Semecarpus rufovelutinus was described by the English botanist Henry Nicholas Ridley in the Kew Bulletin of Miscellaneous Information in 1933. The type specimen was collected in Miri Division in Sarawak, Borneo. The specific epithet rufovelutinus means 'reddish velvety', referring to the leaf indumentum.

== Distribution and habitat ==
Semecarpus rufovelutinus is native to Peninsular Malaysia and Borneo. Its habitat is in lowland forests, to elevations of 500 m (1,600 ft).

== Conservation ==
Semecarpus rufovelutinus has been assessed as least concern on the IUCN Red List. The species occurs over a wide area. However, it is threatened by deforestation and by conversion of land for agriculture and urban development. The species is known to be present in three protected areas.
