= Semecarpus moonii =

Conservation status
- Vulnerable (IUCN 2.3)

Scientific classification
- Kingdom: Plantae
- Clade: Embryophytes
- Clade: Tracheophytes
- Clade: Spermatophytes
- Clade: Angiosperms
- Clade: Eudicots
- Clade: Rosids
- Order: Sapindales
- Family: Anacardiaceae
- Genus: Semecarpus
- Species: S. moonii

Binomial name
- Semecarpus moonii Thwaites

Species of flowering plant

Semecarpus moonii is a species of plant in the family Anacardiaceae. It is endemic to Sri Lanka.No subspecies are listed.
