= Semecarpus heterophyllus =

Conservation status
- Near Threatened (IUCN 3.1)

Scientific classification
- Kingdom: Plantae
- Clade: Tracheophytes
- Clade: Angiosperms
- Clade: Eudicots
- Clade: Rosids
- Order: Sapindales
- Family: Anacardiaceae
- Genus: Semecarpus
- Species: S. heterophyllus

Binomial name
- Semecarpus heterophyllus Blume

Synonyms
- Cassuvium heterophyllum (Blume) Kuntze; Cassuvium nicobarense (Engl.) Kuntze; Semecarpus cinereus H.Pearson; Semecarpus glabrescens Heine; Semecarpus heterophyllus var. angustus Blume; Semecarpus heterophyllus var. majus Blume; Semecarpus heterophyllus var. recurvus Blume; Semecarpus nicobarensis Engl.

Species of flowering plant

Semecarpus heterophyllus is a flowering plant in the family Anacardiaceae. It is native to Southeast Asia.

== Description ==
Semecarpus heterophyllus grows as a tree up to 22 m (70 ft) tall, with a trunk diameter of 60 cm (20 in). The smooth bark is brown to grey. The leaves, in spirals, are obovate, oblanceolate or elliptic and measure up to 22 cm (9 in) long and 8 cm (3 in) wide. The inflorescences, in panicles, feature sessile flowers (without a stalk). The roundish fruits measure up to 2 cm (0.8 in) long.

== Taxonomy ==
Semecarpus heterophyllus was described by German-Dutch botanist Carl Ludwig Blume in Museum botanicum Lugduno-Batavum in 1850. The type specimen was collected in Java. The specific epithet heterophyllus means 'different leaves'.

== Distribution and habitat ==
Semecarpus heterophyllus is native to Malesia (including Java, Borneo, Peninsular Malaysia, Sulawesi, Sumatra and the Lesser Sunda Islands. Its habitat is in rainforest or tropical deciduous forest, to elevations of about 1,800 m (6,000 ft).

== Conservation ==
Semecarpus heterophyllus has been assessed as near threatened on the IUCN Red List. It is threatened by changes in land use, as the forests of its habitat are converted for agriculture, including for plantations, and urban development. The species is not known to be in any protected areas.
