= Semecarpus nigroviridis =

Conservation status
- Vulnerable (IUCN 2.3)

Scientific classification
- Kingdom: Plantae
- Clade: Tracheophytes
- Clade: Angiosperms
- Clade: Eudicots
- Clade: Rosids
- Order: Sapindales
- Family: Anacardiaceae
- Genus: Semecarpus
- Species: S. nigroviridis

Binomial name
- Semecarpus nigroviridis Thwaites

Species of flowering plant

Semecarpus nigroviridis is a species of plant in the family Anacardiaceae. Its native range includes Bangladesh, Sri Lanka and Borneo.
