= Lithocarpus kochummenii =

Scientific classification
- Kingdom: Plantae
- Clade: Tracheophytes
- Clade: Angiosperms
- Clade: Eudicots
- Clade: Rosids
- Order: Fagales
- Family: Fagaceae
- Genus: Lithocarpus
- Species: L. kochummenii

Binomial name
- Lithocarpus kochummenii S.Julia & Soepadmo

Species of tree

Lithocarpus kochummenii is a tree in the beech family Fagaceae. It is named for the botanist K. M. Kochummen.

== Description ==
Lithocarpus kochummenii grows as a tree up to 30 metres (100 ft) tall with a trunk diameter of up to 60 cm (24 in) with stilt roots measuring up 2 metres (7 ft) high. The reddish brown bark is fissured or lenticellate. Its coriaceous leaves measure up to 22 cm (9 in) long. The flowers are solitary along the rachis. Its brown acorns are conical and measure up to 2 cm (1 in) across.

== Distribution and habitat ==
Lithocarpus kochummenii is endemic to Borneo. Its habitat is kerangas, riverside or montane forests from 900 m (3,000 ft) to 1,300 m (4,000 ft) elevation.
