= Semecarpus magnificus =

Scientific classification
- Kingdom: Plantae
- Clade: Tracheophytes
- Clade: Angiosperms
- Clade: Eudicots
- Clade: Rosids
- Order: Sapindales
- Family: Anacardiaceae
- Genus: Semecarpus
- Species: S. magnificus

Binomial name
- Semecarpus magnificus K.Schum.

Synonyms
- Semecarpus undulatus C.T.White

Species of flowering plant

Semecarpus magnificus is a species of unbranched, or scantily branched pachycaulous rainforest tree in the family Anacardiaceae. It is endemic to New Guinea.

== Description ==
According to the original describer Karl Schumann, Semecarpus magnificus is a tree growing to 4–6 m tall. Its leaves are 0.7–1.2 m long and 10.5–20 cm wide near the tip. They are crowded together at the ends of the branches, as in Clavija, Theophrasta and other similar genera. Schumann only had access to male flowers. They are grouped in inflorescences 60–80 cm long, that are composed of distant branches laden with flower clusters. The calyx is about 1 mm long. The petals are 3 mm long, the stamens 4 mm. The rudimentary ovary is about 1 mm long. The fruit is about 3 cm long, including the hypocarpium, and 2.5 cm across.

== Taxonomy ==
Semecarpus magnificus was first described by Karl Schumann in 1889, based on a collection by Max Hollrung made during a research expedition to New Guinea from 1886 to 1888. Schumann used the feminine form of the specific epithet, magnifica, as also noted by the International Plant Names Index, which alters it to magnificus, in agreement with the masculine genus name.

== Distribution ==
Semecarpus magnificus is endemic to New Guinea. It was first observed in what was then Kaiser-Wilhelmsland, in the northeast of the island.
