= Semecarpus ochraceus =

Conservation status
- Critically Endangered (IUCN 2.3)

Scientific classification
- Kingdom: Plantae
- Clade: Tracheophytes
- Clade: Angiosperms
- Clade: Eudicots
- Clade: Rosids
- Order: Sapindales
- Family: Anacardiaceae
- Genus: Semecarpus
- Species: S. ochraceus

Binomial name
- Semecarpus ochraceus Alston

Species of flowering plant

Semecarpus ochraceus is a species of plant in the family Anacardiaceae. It is endemic to Sri Lanka. The specific epithet has also been spelt ochracea.
