= Drimycarpus luridus =

Conservation status
- Least Concern (IUCN 3.1)

Scientific classification
- Kingdom: Plantae
- Clade: Tracheophytes
- Clade: Angiosperms
- Clade: Eudicots
- Clade: Rosids
- Order: Sapindales
- Family: Anacardiaceae
- Genus: Drimycarpus
- Species: D. luridus

Binomial name
- Drimycarpus luridus (Hook.f.) Ding Hou

Synonyms
- Semecarpus luridus Hook.f.; Semecarpus glaber Ridl.; Swintonia lurida King

Species of flowering plant

Drimycarpus luridus is a plant in the family Anacardiaceae. It is native to Southeast Asia.

== Description ==
Drimycarpus luridus grows as a tree up to 27 m (90 ft) tall with a trunk diameter of up to 40 cm (16 in). The smooth bark is brown to grey. The leathery leaves are oblanceolate, oblong or elliptic and measure up to 37 cm (15 in) long and up to 10 cm (4 in) wide. The inflorescences are axillary.

== Taxonomy ==
Drimycarpus luridus was first described as Semecarpus luridus by British botanist Joseph Dalton Hooker in 1879 in The Flora of British India. In 1978, Dutch botanist Ding Hou transferred the species to the genus Drimycarpus. The type specimen was collected in Malacca. The specific epithet luridus means 'brown or sallow', a possible reference to the colouring of twig patches.

== Distribution and habitat ==
Drimycarpus luridus is native to Thailand, Sumatra, Peninsular Malaysia and Borneo. Its habitat is in forests, in lowlands or on hills, at elevations to about 1,000 m (3,300 ft).

== Conservation ==
Drimycarpus luridus has been assessed as least concern on the IUCN Red List. However, the species' habitat is threatened by deforestation and conversion of land for agricultural and urban development purposes. The species is present in a few protected areas.

== Uses ==
The timber of Drimycarpus luridus is locally used in making beams. It is considered durable.
