= Semecarpus gardneri =

Conservation status
- Vulnerable (IUCN 2.3)

Scientific classification
- Kingdom: Plantae
- Clade: Tracheophytes
- Clade: Angiosperms
- Clade: Eudicots
- Clade: Rosids
- Order: Sapindales
- Family: Anacardiaceae
- Genus: Semecarpus
- Species: S. gardneri

Binomial name
- Semecarpus gardneri Thwaites (1858)

Synonyms
- Cassuvium gardneri Kuntze (1891)

Species of flowering plant

Semecarpus gardneri is a species of plant in the family Anacardiaceae. It is a tree endemic to Sri Lanka.
