= Semecarpus riparius =

Conservation status
- Endangered (IUCN 2.3)

Scientific classification
- Kingdom: Plantae
- Clade: Tracheophytes
- Clade: Angiosperms
- Clade: Eudicots
- Clade: Rosids
- Order: Sapindales
- Family: Anacardiaceae
- Genus: Semecarpus
- Species: S. riparius

Binomial name
- Semecarpus riparius Virot

Species of flowering plant

Semecarpus riparius is a species of plant in the family Anacardiaceae. It is endemic to New Caledonia. The specific epithet is also spelt riparia.
