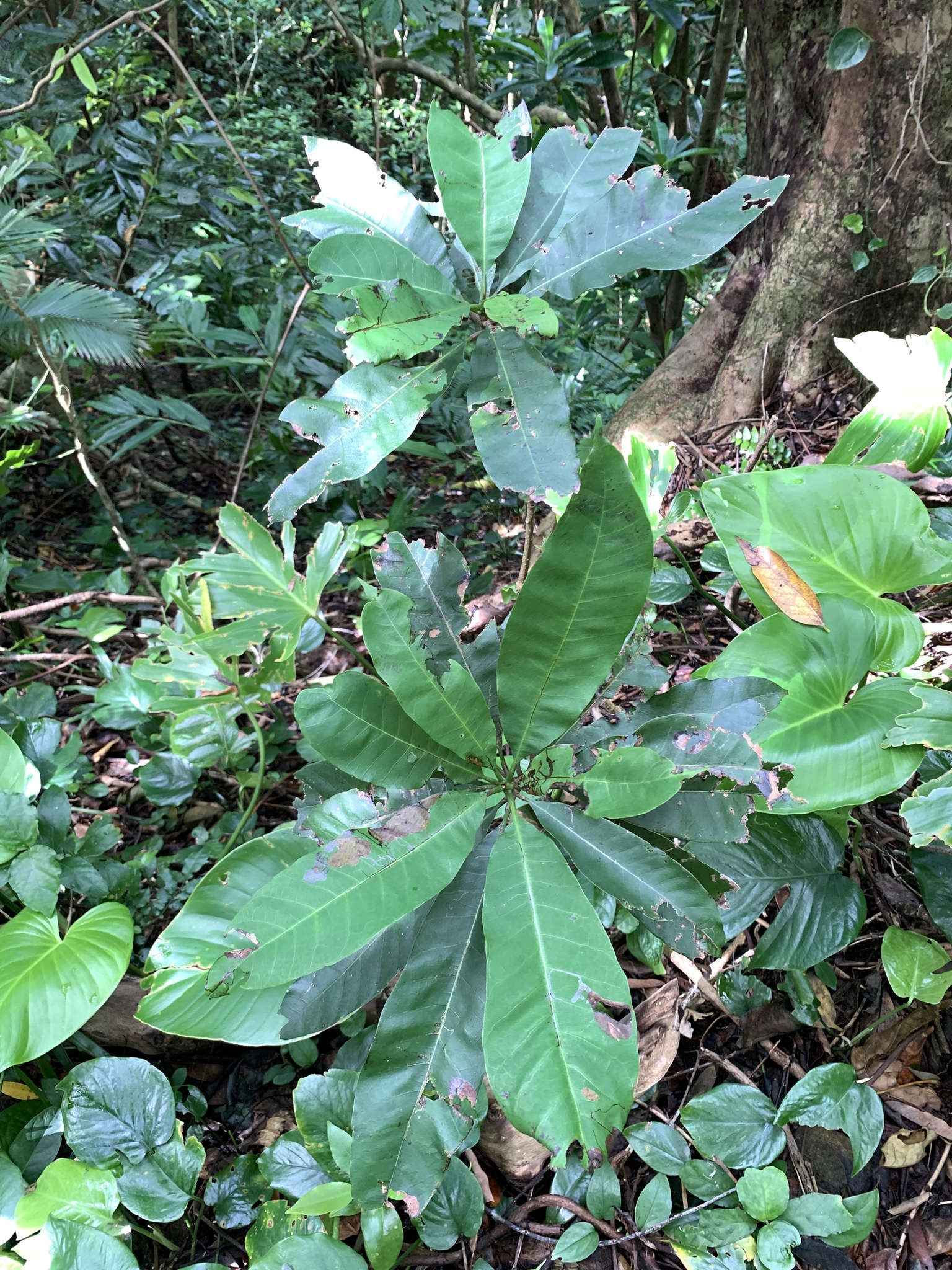
- In Taiwan

Scientific classification
- Kingdom: Plantae
- Clade: Tracheophytes
- Clade: Angiosperms
- Clade: Eudicots
- Clade: Rosids
- Order: Sapindales
- Family: Anacardiaceae
- Genus: Semecarpus
- Species: S. cuneiformis

Binomial name
- Semecarpus cuneiformis Blanco

Synonyms
- List: Semecarpus elmeri Perkins; Semecarpus ferrugineus Merr.; Semecarpus megabotrys Merr.; Semecarpus merrillianus Perkins; Semecarpus micranthus Perkins; Semecarpus obtusifolius Merr.; Semecarpus perrottetii Marchand; Semecarpus philippinensis Engl.; Semecarpus pilosus Merr.; Semecarpus ridleyi Merr.; Semecarpus taftianus Perkins; Semecarpus thyrsoideus Elmer; Semecarpus whitfordii Merr.

= Semecarpus cuneiformis =

Species of plant in the family Anacardiaceae

Semecarpus cuneiformis is a tree in the cashew and sumac family Anacardiaceae. The specific epithet cuneiformis is from the Latin meaning 'wedge-shaped', referring to the leaf base.

== Description ==
Semecarpus cuneiformis grows as a tree up to 15 metres (50 ft) tall with a trunk diameter of up to 20 cm (8 in). The leaves measure up to 28 cm (11 in) long. Its roundish fruits measure up to 0.7 cm (0.3 in) in diameter.

== Distribution and habitat ==
Semecarpus cuneiformis grows naturally in Borneo, the Philippines, Sulawesi, the Lesser Sunda Islands and Taiwan. Its habitat is lowland forests from sea-level to 100 m (300 ft) altitude.

Semecarpus cuneiformis figures in the etiological legend of the community of Krus Na Ligas in Quezon City, Philippines, which is famous for adjoining the campus of the University of the Philippines Diliman. According to the legend, the earliest settlers of the village noticed that a particular specimen of Semecarpus cuneiformis, known locally as a "Ligas" tree had branches which took the form of a cross. The highly religious settlers thus named their community after the tree.
