= Drimycarpus maximus =

Conservation status
- Critically Endangered (IUCN 3.1)

Scientific classification
- Kingdom: Plantae
- Clade: Tracheophytes
- Clade: Angiosperms
- Clade: Eudicots
- Clade: Rosids
- Order: Sapindales
- Family: Anacardiaceae
- Genus: Drimycarpus
- Species: D. maximus

Binomial name
- Drimycarpus maximus Kochummen

Species of flowering plant

Drimycarpus maximus is a tree of Borneo in the family Anacardiaceae. The specific epithet maximus means 'greatest', referring to the large leaves and fruits.

== Description ==
Drimycarpus maximus grows as a tree up to 23 metres (80 ft) tall with a trunk diameter of up to 30 cm (12 in). Its smooth bark is coloured grey. The leaves measure up to 35.5 cm (14 in) long. The oblong fruits measure up to 2 cm (0.8 in) long.

== Distribution and habitat ==
Drimycarpus maximus is endemic to Borneo, where it is confined to Sarawak. Its habitat is mixed dipterocarp forests.

== Conservation ==
Drimycarpus maximus has been assessed as critically endangered on the IUCN Red List. It is threatened by being in a confined area which is subject to logging and plantation activity. The species is not present in any protected area.
