= Semecarpus borneensis =

Conservation status
- Least Concern (IUCN 3.1)

Scientific classification
- Kingdom: Plantae
- Clade: Tracheophytes
- Clade: Angiosperms
- Clade: Eudicots
- Clade: Rosids
- Order: Sapindales
- Family: Anacardiaceae
- Genus: Semecarpus
- Species: S. borneensis

Binomial name
- Semecarpus borneensis Merr.

Species of flowering plant

Semecarpus borneensis is a flowering plant in the family Anacardiaceae. It is native to Borneo.

== Description ==
Semecarpus borneensis grows as a tree up to 12 m (40 ft) tall, with a stem diameter up to 15 cm (6 in). The leaves are oblanceolate, oblong or elliptic and measure up to 20 cm (8 in) long and 8 cm (3 in) wide. The inflorescences, in panicles, measure up to 20 cm (8 in) long. The fruits are ellipsoid.

== Taxonomy ==
Semecarpus borneensis was described by the American botanist Elmer Drew Merrill in the Journal of the Straits Branch of the Royal Asiatic Society in 1922. The type specimen was collected in Kudat Division in Sabah, Borneo. The specific epithet refers to Borneo.

== Distribution and habitat ==
Semecarpus borneensis is endemic to Borneo, where it is present in Sabah and Sarawak. Its habitat is in lowland to lower montane forests, at elevations to 1,800 m (6,000 ft).

== Conservation ==
Semecarpus borneensis has been assessed as least concern on the IUCN Red List. Its population is stable and the forests of its habitat remain intact. The species is present in five protected areas.
