= Melanochyla condensata =

Conservation status
- Endangered (IUCN 3.1)

Scientific classification
- Kingdom: Plantae
- Clade: Embryophytes
- Clade: Tracheophytes
- Clade: Angiosperms
- Clade: Eudicots
- Clade: Rosids
- Order: Sapindales
- Family: Anacardiaceae
- Genus: Melanochyla
- Species: M. condensata

Binomial name
- Melanochyla condensata Kochummen

Species of flowering plant

Melanochyla condensata is a flowering plant in the family Anacardiaceae. It is native to Borneo.

== Description ==
Melanochyla condensata grows as a tree up to 12 m (40 ft) tall, with a trunk diameter of up to 8 cm (3 in). The smooth bark is grey to brown. The leathery leaves are oblanceolate and measure up to 55 cm (22 in) long and to 13 cm (5 in) wide. The flowers have triangular sepals. The oblong fruits are brown and measure up to 2 cm (0.8 in) long.

== Taxonomy ==
Melanochyla condensata was first described in 1996 by Malaysian botanist Kizhakkedathu Mathai Kochummen in the journal Sandakania. The type specimen was collected in Sarawak in Borneo. The specific epithet condensata means 'condensed', referring to the inflorescence.

== Distribution and habitat ==
Melanochyla condensata is endemic to Borneo, where it is confined to Sarawak and Brunei. Its habitat is in lowland forests.

== Conservation ==
Melanochyla condensata has been assessed as endangered on the IUCN Red List. Its habitat is threatened by deforestation and by conversion of land for plantations and agriculture. However, the species is present in at least one protected area.
