= Semecarpus acuminatus =

Conservation status
- Endangered (IUCN 2.3)

Scientific classification
- Kingdom: Plantae
- Clade: Tracheophytes
- Clade: Angiosperms
- Clade: Eudicots
- Clade: Rosids
- Order: Sapindales
- Family: Anacardiaceae
- Genus: Semecarpus
- Species: S. acuminatus

Binomial name
- Semecarpus acuminatus Thwaites

Species of flowering plant

Semecarpus acuminatus is a species of plant in the family Anacardiaceae. It is native to Sri Lanka, Sri Lanka, Bangladesh and Myanmar. The specific epithet was originally spelt acuminata.
