= Kochummenia =

Scientific classification
- Kingdom: Plantae
- Clade: Embryophytes
- Clade: Tracheophytes
- Clade: Angiosperms
- Clade: Eudicots
- Clade: Asterids
- Order: Gentianales
- Family: Rubiaceae
- Subfamily: Ixoroideae
- Tribe: Gardenieae
- Genus: Kochummenia; K.M.Wong

Genus of plants

Kochummenia is a genus of plants in the family Rubiaceae. As of March 2023, it contains three accepted species, all endemic to Peninsular Malaysia. It is named for the Malaysian botanist Kizhakkedathu Mathai Kochummen.

- Kochummenia parviflora K.M.Wong – Terengganu
- Kochummenia stenopetala (King & Gamble) K.M.Wong – Perak
- Kochummenia terengganuensis K.M.Wong
