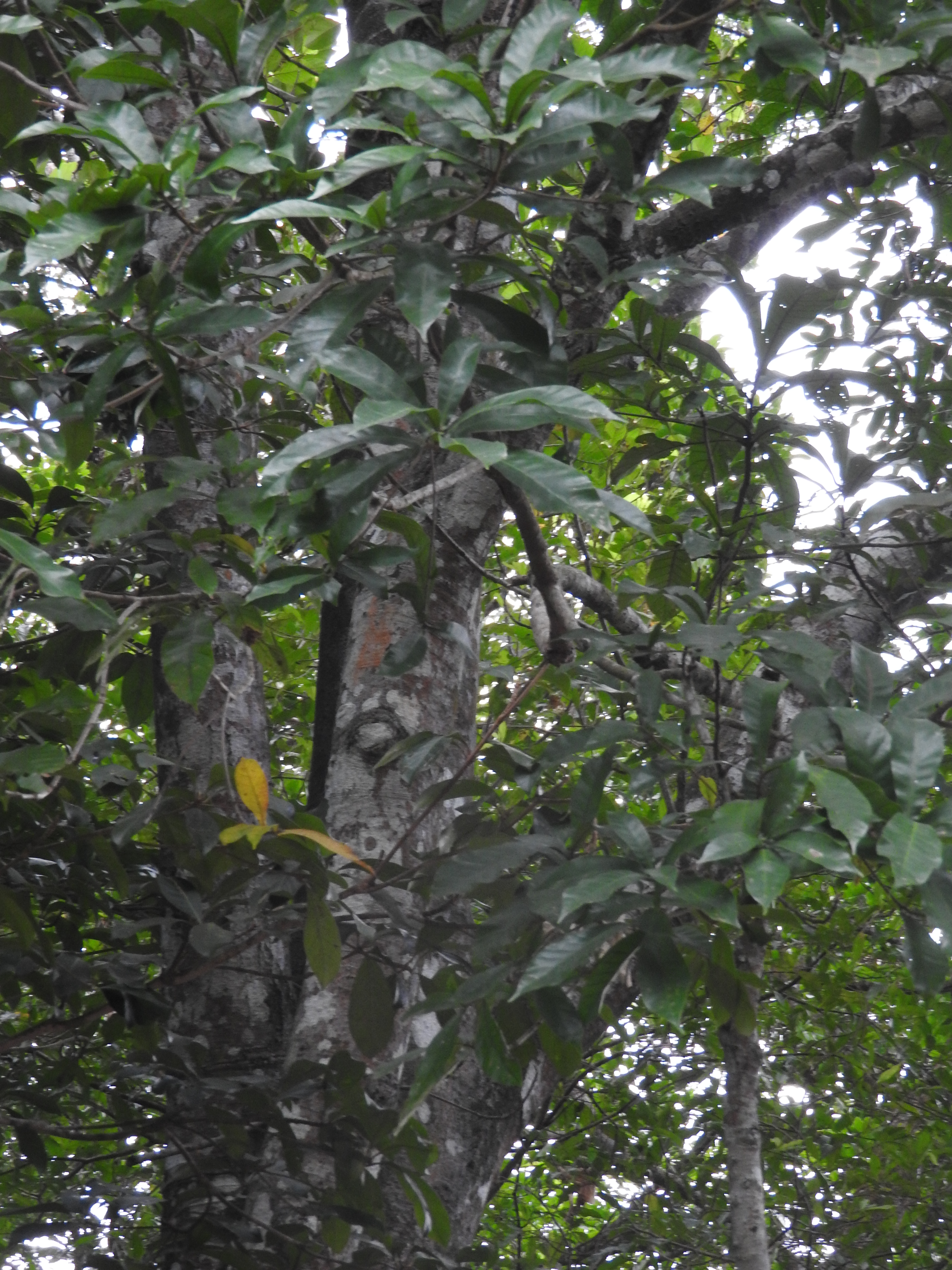
- Semecarpus auriculata

Conservation status
- Near Threatened (IUCN 2.3)

Scientific classification
- Kingdom: Plantae
- Clade: Tracheophytes
- Clade: Angiosperms
- Clade: Eudicots
- Clade: Rosids
- Order: Sapindales
- Family: Anacardiaceae
- Genus: Semecarpus
- Species: S. auriculatus

Binomial name
- Semecarpus auriculatus Bedd.

= Semecarpus auriculatus =

Species of flowering plant

Semecarpus auriculatus is a species of plant in the family Anacardiaceae. It is endemic to India. The specific epithet was originally spelt auriculata.
