= Semecarpus bunburyanus =

Conservation status
- Least Concern (IUCN 3.1)

Scientific classification
- Kingdom: Plantae
- Clade: Tracheophytes
- Clade: Angiosperms
- Clade: Eudicots
- Clade: Rosids
- Order: Sapindales
- Family: Anacardiaceae
- Genus: Semecarpus
- Species: S. bunburyanus

Binomial name
- Semecarpus bunburyanus Gibbs

Synonyms
- Semecarpus oblanceolatus Merr.; Semecarpus scaberulus Merr.; Semecarpus subsessilifolius Merr.

Species of flowering plant

Semecarpus bunburyanus is a flowering plant in the family Anacardiaceae. It is native to Southeast Asia.

== Description ==
Semecarpus bunburyanus grows as a tree up to 15 m (50 ft) tall, with a trunk diameter up to 20 cm (8 in). The leaves are oblanceolate, oblong or obovate and measure up to 100 cm (40 in) long and 22 cm (9 in) wide. The inflorescences, in panicles, measure up to 35 cm (14 in) long and feature white flowers. The fruits are roundish and measure up to 2 cm (0.8 in) long.

== Taxonomy ==
Semecarpus bunburyanus was described by the British botanist Lilian Gibbs in the Botanical Journal of the Linnean Society in 1914. The type specimen was collected on Mount Kinabalu in Sabah, Borneo. The species was named for a Mr. Bunbury, a British North Borneo official.

== Distribution and habitat ==
Semecarpus bunburyanus is native to Borneo and the Philippines (including in Capiz). Its habitat is in lowland and peat swamp forest, sometimes by rivers or on hills, to elevations of 450 m (1,500 ft).

== Conservation ==
Semecarpus bunburyanus has been assessed as least concern on the IUCN Red List. However, its population is decreasing and it is threatened by deforestation, including for logging, and by conversion of land for agriculture and urban development. In Borneo, the species is present in numerous protected areas including Kinabalu Park, Tawau Hills Park and Maliau Basin Conservation Area.
