= Semecarpus parvifolius =

Conservation status
- Vulnerable (IUCN 2.3)

Scientific classification
- Kingdom: Plantae
- Clade: Tracheophytes
- Clade: Angiosperms
- Clade: Eudicots
- Clade: Rosids
- Order: Sapindales
- Family: Anacardiaceae
- Genus: Semecarpus
- Species: S. parvifolius

Binomial name
- Semecarpus parvifolius Thwaites

Species of flowering plant

Semecarpus parvifolius is a species of plant in the family Anacardiaceae. It is endemic to Sri Lanka. The specific epithet was originally spelt parvifolia.
