= Semecarpus minutipetalus =

Conservation status
- Critically endangered, possibly extinct (IUCN 3.1)

Scientific classification
- Kingdom: Plantae
- Clade: Embryophytes
- Clade: Tracheophytes
- Clade: Angiosperms
- Clade: Eudicots
- Clade: Rosids
- Order: Sapindales
- Family: Anacardiaceae
- Genus: Semecarpus
- Species: S. minutipetalus

Binomial name
- Semecarpus minutipetalus Kochummen

Species of flowering plant

Semecarpus minutipetalus is a flowering plant in the family Anacardiaceae. It is native to Borneo.

== Description ==
Semecarpus minutipetalus grows as a tree up to 12 m (40 ft) tall, with a trunk diameter of up to 15 cm (6 in). Its twigs are white. The leaves are oblong or obovate and measure up to 31.5 cm (12 in) long and to 10 cm (4 in) wide. The inflorescences, in panicles, feature flowers with very small petals.

== Taxonomy ==
Semecarpus minutipetalus was described by Malaysian botanist Kizhakkedathu Mathai Kochummen in Sandakania in 1996. The type specimen was collected in Miri District in Sarawak, Borneo. The specific epithet minutipetalus means 'small petal'.

== Distribution and habitat ==
Semecarpus minutipetalus is endemic to Borneo, where it is known only from Sarawak. Its habitat is in lowland dipterocarp forests, at elevations to 140 m (500 ft).

== Conservation ==
Semecarpus minutipetalus has been assessed as critically endangered (possibly extinct) on the IUCN Red List. It is only known from a single locality which has been converted to palm oil plantations. It is not known to be present in any protected areas.
