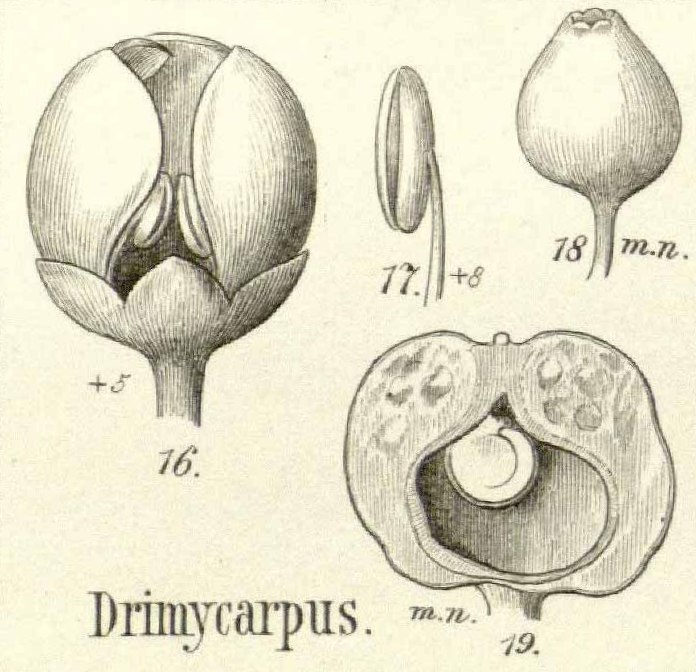
- Drimycarpus racemosus

Scientific classification
- Kingdom: Plantae
- Clade: Tracheophytes
- Clade: Angiosperms
- Clade: Eudicots
- Clade: Rosids
- Order: Sapindales
- Family: Anacardiaceae
- Subfamily: Anacardioideae
- Genus: Drimycarpus; Hook.f.

= Drimycarpus =

Genus of trees

Drimycarpus is a small genus of trees in the cashew and sumac family Anacardiaceae. The generic name is from the Greek meaning "pungent fruit".

== Distribution and habitat ==
Drimycarpus species grow naturally in tropical Asia from India to Borneo. Their habitat is forests from sea-level to 1,000 m (3,300 ft) altitude.

== Species ==
As of February 2025, Plants of the World Online accepted these species:

- Drimycarpus anacardifolius C.Y.Wu & T.L.Ming
- Drimycarpus luridus (Hook.f.) Ding Hou
- Drimycarpus maximus Kochummen
- Drimycarpus racemosus (Roxb.) Hook.f. ex Marchand
