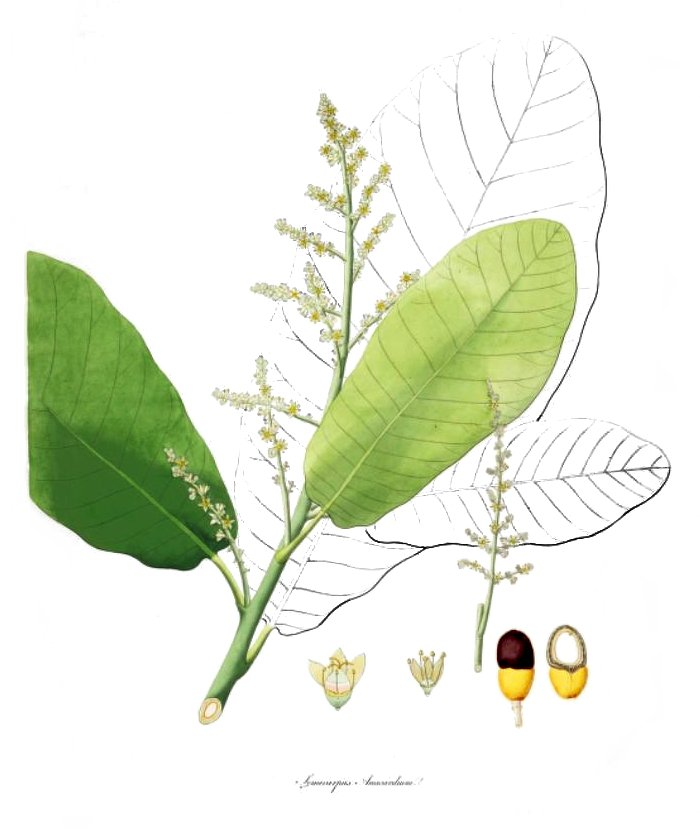

Conservation status
- Least Concern (IUCN 3.1)

Scientific classification
- Kingdom: Plantae
- Clade: Tracheophytes
- Clade: Angiosperms
- Clade: Eudicots
- Clade: Rosids
- Order: Sapindales
- Family: Anacardiaceae
- Genus: Semecarpus
- Species: S. anacardium

Binomial name
- Semecarpus anacardium L.f.

= Semecarpus anacardium =

Species of tree

Semecarpus anacardium, commonly known as the marking nut tree, Malacca bean tree, marany nut, oriental cashew, dhobi nut tree and varnish tree, is a native of India, found in the outer Himalayas to the Coromandel Coast. It is closely related to the cashew.

== Etymology ==
Semecarpus anacardium was called the "marking nut" by Europeans because it was used by washermen to mark cloth and clothing before washing, as it imparted a water insoluble mark to the cloth.

The specific epithet anacardium ("up-heart") was used by apothecaries in the 16th century to refer to the plant's fruit. It was later used by Linnaeus to refer to the cashew.

== Description ==
It is a deciduous tree. Like the closely related cashew, the fruit is composed of two parts, a reddish-orange accessory fruit and a black drupe that grows at the end. The nut is about 25 millimetres (1 in) long, ovoid and smooth lustrous black. The accessory fruit is edible and sweet when ripe, but the black fruit is toxic and produces a severe allergic reaction if it is consumed or its resin comes in contact with the skin. The seed inside the black fruit, known as godambi (गोडंबी), is edible when properly prepared.

== Uses ==
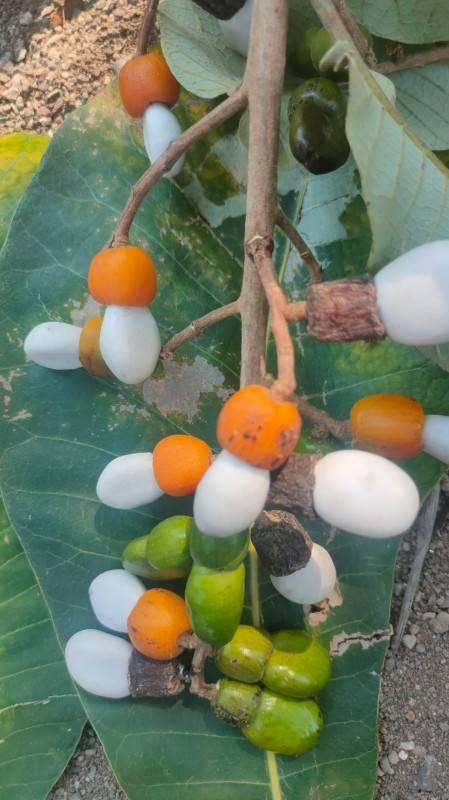
Dried fruits

In medieval times, Semecarpus anacardium was thought to aid in memory retention, for which cause the following dictum became widespread among Jewish scholars: "Repeat [your lessons], and repeat [your lessons], but never stand in need of the marking nut!"
