= Myristica swamp =

Freshwater swamp forest

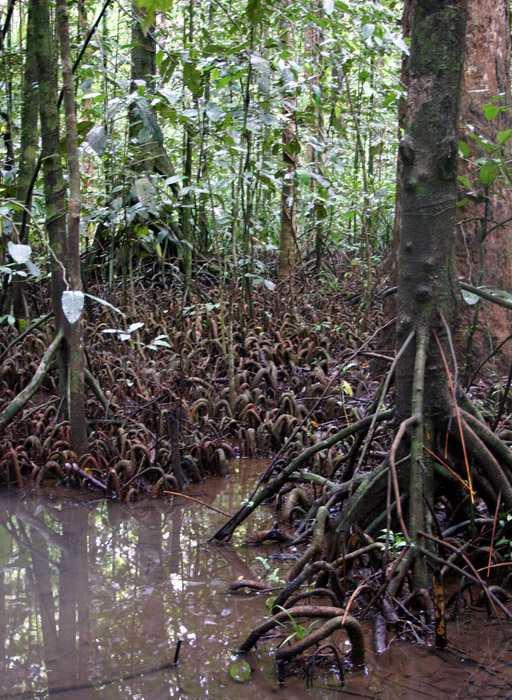
Myristica swamp with stilt roots and knee roots

Myristica swamps are a type of freshwater swamp forest predominantly composed of species of Myristica. These are found in three localities in India. Myristica swamps have adapted to inundation by way of stilt roots and knee roots. Myristica swamps are found in the Uttara Kannada district of Karnataka State and in the southern parts of Kerala, in the sacred groves of Goa and two locations in Maharashtra.

== History ==
Myristica swamps were described as a separate evergreen forest type by Krishnamurthy in 1960. These received attention in 1988 when Rodgers and Panwar described it as the most endangered forest ecosystem in India. The swamps in Karnataka has been studied in detail by Chandran, MDS and his colleagues in 1999.

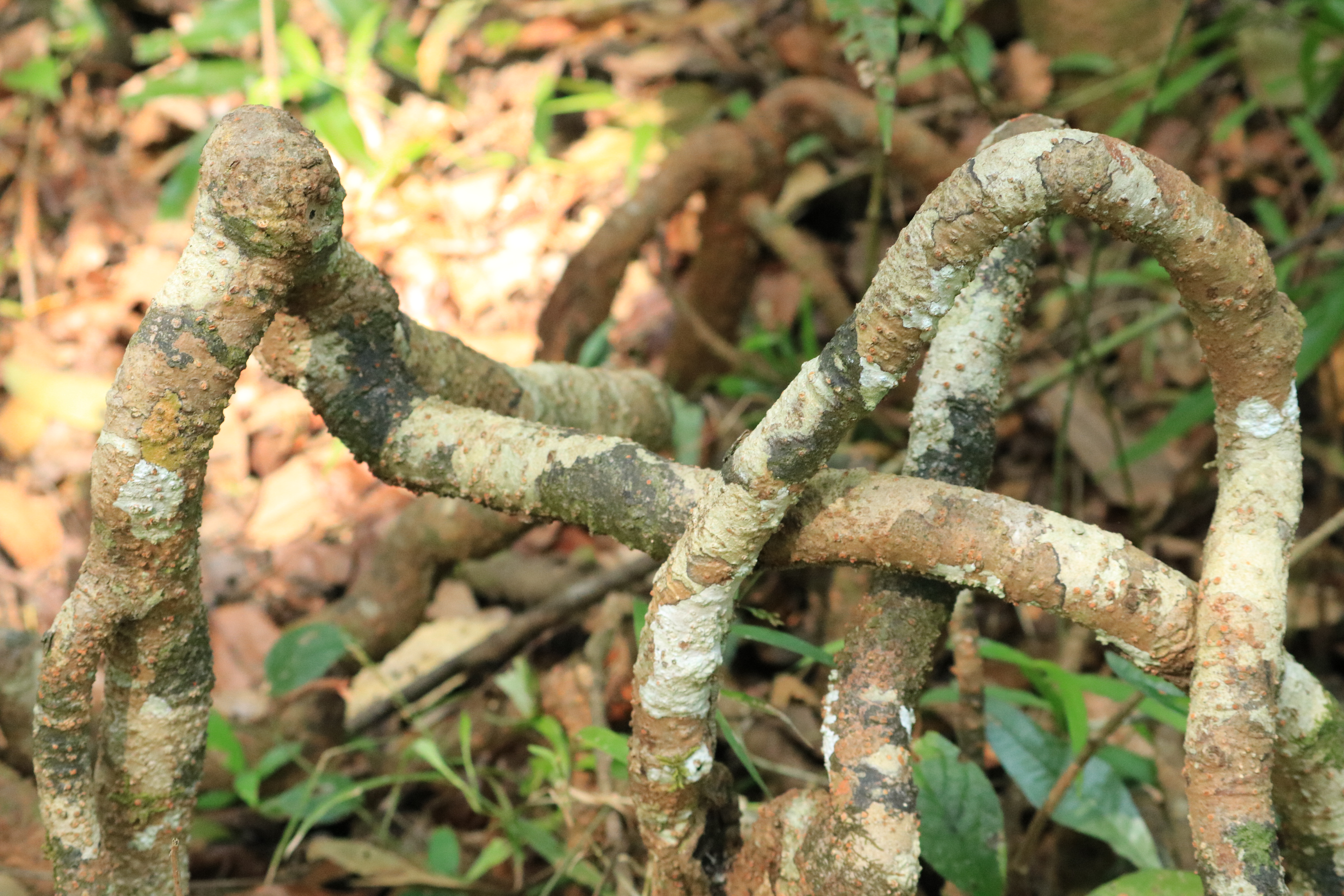
Myristica swamp in Arippa forest

Nair, PV and his team has conducted a detailed study on the flora and fauna of the Myristica swamps of southern Kerala in 2007. In Kerala, the Myristica swamps are found predominantly in Kulathupuzha, Anchal and Shendurney regions of Kollam district. Nair PVand Pandalai carried out successful re-introduction of one of the swamp tree species in 2012.

== Mapping ==
The swamps occur on either side of first order streams. The swamp boundary can be seen distinctly in the field due to the stilt roots. Chandran and his colleagues were able to locate 51 swamps in Uttara Kannada. They were able to show them on maps, and describe location, but exact boundary mapping was not attempted. Mapping by Nairpv and colleagues in 2007 was more detailed and they mapped 60 swamps using GPS technology. The swamps ranged in area from about 0.25 to 10 hectares. The swamps are distributed in two river systems spread over two districts. Boundary mapping has revealed that the total area of Myristica swamps in Kerala is about 1.5 km2 which hardly make up 0.004% of the total land area of Kerala (38,864 km2) and 0.014% of the total forest area of Kerala (11,126 km2). The swamps in Karnataka are located at about 300m altitude, the swamps in Kerala are at an altitude of 200m.

== Flora ==
Chandran and his colleagues give detailed description of the flora. They found that 63 of 130 flowering plants identified are endemic to Western Ghats of India. Major species of trees were Gymnocranthera canarica, Myristica fatua, Mastixia arborea, Semecarpus travancorica, Hopea ponga, Lophopetalum wightianum, Holigarna grahami, Sysygium laetum, etc. Studies by Nair and colleagues in southern Kerala in 2007 documents eighty two trees and ninety four species of herbs/shrubs. Forty nine lianas have also been recorded. Twelve of these plants species have been redlisted and about 28 species of them are endemic to Western Ghats. Out of the 19 sample plots, Gymnacranthera farquhariana was dominant in 10 plots. Myristica fatua was the dominant tree in 6 swamps. In the remaining plots, Vateria indica was the dominant tree. Holigarna arnottiana and Lophopetalum wightianum dominated in another two plots.

== Fauna ==
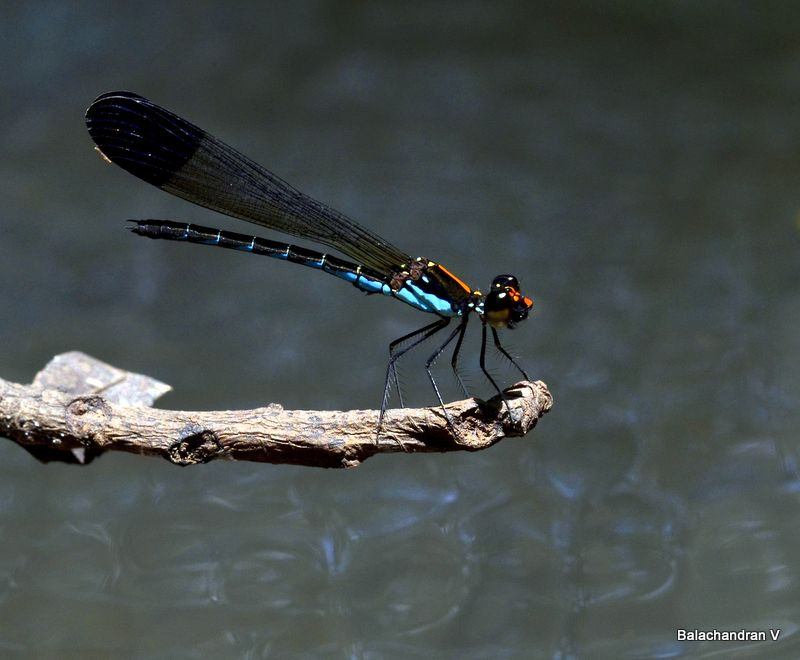
Myristica Sapphire, (Calocypha laidlawi); a damselfly found only in Myristica swamps.

Nair and colleagues in southern Kerala in 2007 focussed on fauna also. Faunal biodiversity of the Myristica swamps consisted of Platyhelminthes- (Bipalium-2, tapeworm-1) 3 species, Nemathelminthes – 1 species, Annelida (Oligochaeta -2and Hirudinea-2) 4 species, Mollusca- 10 species, Unidentified Crustacean-1 species, Insecta- 281 species belonging to 83 identified families, Myriapoda- 6 species and Arachnidae 54 species, Pisces 14 species, Amphibia 56 species, Reptilia 55 species, Aves 129 species and Mammalia 27 species. Quantitative analysis of herpetofauna revealed that the differences in the environmental characteristics inside and outside the swamp play an important role in regulating the species diversity and abundance of both amphibians and reptiles. Amphibians were more susceptible to environmental changes. Patterns of diversity and abundance during day and night, across swamps and among months varied. There was no significant difference in patterns of diversity and abundance recorded during the two years. Many of the animals documented belong to red list and endemic categories.

== Conservation ==
Nair and colleagues in southern Kerala highlight the enormous biodiversity of the Myristica swamp forests. The study also indicates that there are gaps in information which can be filled up only with further studies in this region. A challenge is how further studies can be carried out without disturbing the delicate ecosystem of these swamps. A pertinent question is whether all human entry should be banned into the best and least disturbed patches of swamps, leaving only the disturbed patches for human visits (tourism and academic study). Conservation of these small and scattered swamp patches must also address the contiguous areas. Strategies for management and conservation have been suggested in the above context.

== See also ==
- Nelapattu Bird Sanctuary
- Deepwater rice
- Freshwater swamp forest
