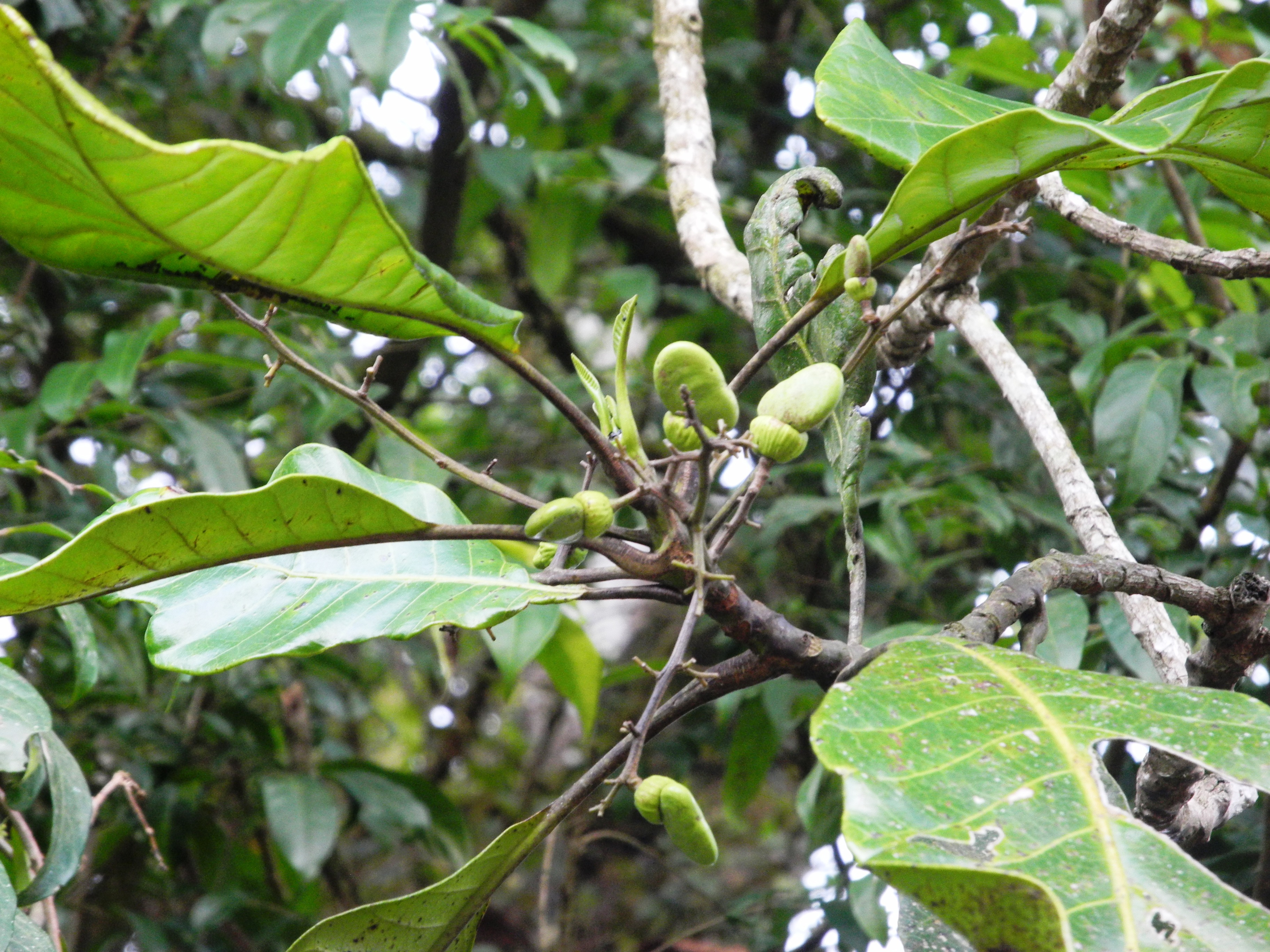

Conservation status
- Vulnerable (IUCN 3.1)

Scientific classification
- Kingdom: Plantae
- Clade: Tracheophytes
- Clade: Angiosperms
- Clade: Eudicots
- Clade: Rosids
- Order: Sapindales
- Family: Anacardiaceae
- Genus: Semecarpus
- Species: S. travancoricus

Binomial name
- Semecarpus travancoricus Bedd.

= Semecarpus travancoricus =

Species of tree

Semecarpus travancoricus is a species of plant in the family Anacardiaceae native to India and Bangladesh. The specific epithet was originally spelt travancorica. In India, it is found in the southern Western Ghats in South India. It is a tree of evergreen forests and is found only south of the Anamalais at an elevation around 1300 MSL.
