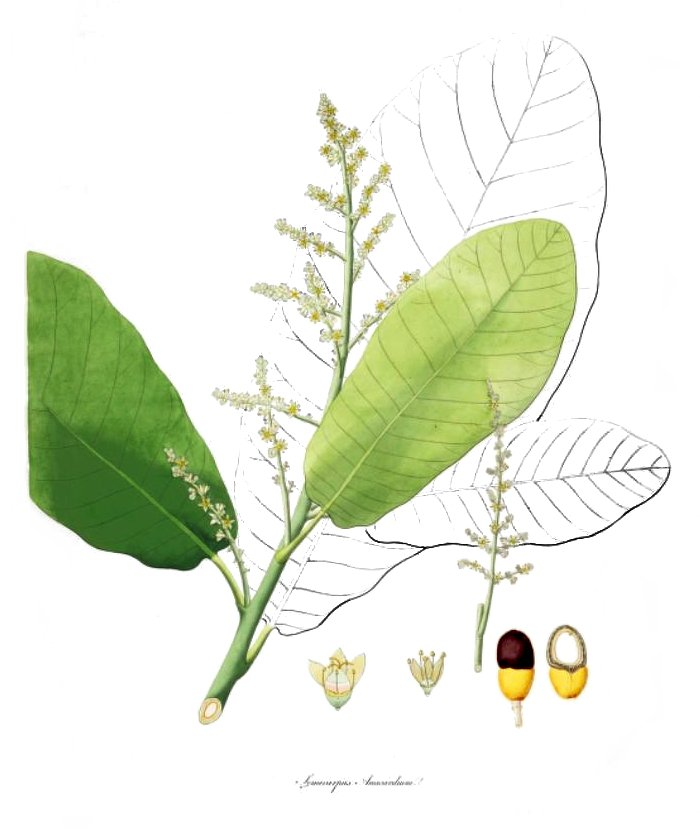
- Semecarpus anacardium

Scientific classification
- Kingdom: Plantae
- Clade: Tracheophytes
- Clade: Angiosperms
- Clade: Eudicots
- Clade: Rosids
- Order: Sapindales
- Family: Anacardiaceae
- Subfamily: Anacardioideae
- Genus: Semecarpus; L.f.

Species
- See text.

Synonyms
- Melanocommia Ridl. (1933); Nothopegiopsis Lauterb. (1920); Oncocarpus A.Gray (1853)

= Semecarpus =

Genus of flowering plants

Semecarpus is a genus of plants in the family Anacardiaceae. It includes 87 species native to the Indian subcontinent, Indochina, Malesia, Taiwan, Papuasia, Queensland, and the South Pacific.

== Taxonomy ==
The genus Semecarpus was erected by Carl Linnaeus the Younger in 1782 in Supplementum Plantarum. In the same work, he described Semecarpus anacardium. The gender of the genus name has been the subject of some confusion. Early authors treated it as feminine. As one example, in 1850, Carl Ludwig Blume described a number of species of Semecarpus, such as Semecarpus heterophylla and Semecarpus longifolia, using feminine endings for the specific epithet. However, Example 3 of Article 62 of the International Code of Nomenclature for algae, fungi, and plants states that all compounds ending in the Greek masculine ‑carpos or ‑carpus are masculine. As of June 2022, the International Plant Names Index and Plants of the World Online used masculine endings, such as Semecarpus heterophyllus and Semecarpus longifolius, while the Global Biodiversity Information Facility had mixed endings, such as Semecarpus heterophylla and Semecarpus longifolius.

=== Species ===
As of June 2022, Plants of the World Online accepted the following species:

- Semecarpus acuminatus Thwaites (orth. var. Semecarpus acuminata)
- Semecarpus albicans Lauterb.
- Semecarpus anacardiopsis Evrard & Tardieu
- Semecarpus anacardium L.f.
- Semecarpus angulatus Kochummen
- Semecarpus angustifolius Kochummen
- Semecarpus annamensis Tardieu
- Semecarpus aruensis Engl.
- Semecarpus ater (G.Forst.) Vieill.
- Semecarpus auriculatus Bedd. (orth. var. Semecarpus auriculata)
- Semecarpus australiensis Engl.
- Semecarpus balansae Engl.
- Semecarpus borneensis Merr.
- Semecarpus brachystachys Merr. & L.M.Perry
- Semecarpus bracteatus Lauterb.
- Semecarpus bunburyanus Gibbs
- Semecarpus calcicola Kochummen
- Semecarpus cassuvium Roxb.
- Semecarpus caudatus Pierre
- Semecarpus cochinchinensis Engl.
- Semecarpus coriaceus Thwaites (orth. var. Semecarpus coriacea)
- Semecarpus cuneiformis Blanco
- Semecarpus cupularis Kochummen
- Semecarpus curtisii King
- Semecarpus decipiens Merr. & L.M.Perry
- Semecarpus densiflorus (Merr.) Steenis
- Semecarpus euodiifolius Kochummen
- Semecarpus forstenii Blume
- Semecarpus gardneri Thwaites
- Semecarpus glauciphyllus Elmer
- Semecarpus graciliflorus Evrard & Tardieu
- Semecarpus heterophyllus Blume
- Semecarpus humilis Evrard & Tardieu
- Semecarpus impressicostatus Kochummen
- Semecarpus insularum Seem.
- Semecarpus kathalekanensis Dasappa & Swam.
- Semecarpus kinabaluensis Kochummen
- Semecarpus kraemeri Lauterb.
- Semecarpus kurzii Engl.
- Semecarpus lamii Slis
- Semecarpus lineatus Kosterm.
- Semecarpus longifolius Blume
- Semecarpus longipes Kosterm.
- Semecarpus lucens King
- Semecarpus macrophyllus Merr.
- Semecarpus magnificus K.Schum.
- Semecarpus marginatus Thwaites
- Semecarpus microcarpus Wall. ex Hook.f.
- Semecarpus minutipetalus Kochummen
- Semecarpus moonii Thwaites
- Semecarpus myriocarpus Evrard & Tardieu
- Semecarpus neocaledonicus Engl.
- Semecarpus nidificans (Lauterb.) Ding Hou
- Semecarpus nigroviridis Thwaites
- Semecarpus obovatus Moon (orth. var. Semecarpus obovata)
- Semecarpus ochraceus Alston (orth. var. Semecarpus ochracea)
- Semecarpus panduratus Kurz
- Semecarpus papuanus Lauterb.
- Semecarpus parvifolius Thwaites (orth. var. Semecarpus parvifolia)
- Semecarpus paucinervius Merr.
- Semecarpus perniciosus Evrard & Tardieu
- Semecarpus poyaensis Hoff
- Semecarpus prainii King
- Semecarpus pseudoemarginatus Kosterman (orth. var. Semecarpus pseudo-emarginata)
- Semecarpus pubescens Thwaites
- Semecarpus pulvinatus Kochummen
- Semecarpus reticulatus Lecomte
- Semecarpus riparius Virot (orth. var. Semecarpus riparia)
- Semecarpus rostratus Valeton
- Semecarpus rufovelutinus Ridl.
- Semecarpus sandakanus Kochummen
- Semecarpus schlechteri Lauterb.
- Semecarpus stenophyllus Merr.
- Semecarpus subpanduriformis Wall. ex Hook.f.
- Semecarpus subpeltatus Thwaites (orth. var. Semecarpus subpeltata)
- Semecarpus subracemosus Kurz
- Semecarpus subspathulatus King
- Semecarpus tannaensis Guillaumin
- Semecarpus tonkinensis Lecomte
- Semecarpus trachyphyllus Perkins
- Semecarpus travancoricus Bedomme (orth. var. Semecarpus travancorica)
- Semecarpus trengganuensis Kochummen
- Semecarpus velutinus King
- Semecarpus venenosus Volkens
- Semecarpus virotii Hoff
- Semecarpus vitiensis (A.Gray) Engl.
- Semecarpus walkeri Hook.f.
