= Kizhakkedathu Mathai Kochummen =

Malaysian botanist

- Born: 6 July 1931; Kerala, India
- Died: 31 March 1999 (aged 67); Kuala Lumpur, Malaysia
- Known for: The Tree Flora of Pasoh Forest, plant collections
- Scientific career
- Fields: Botany
- Workplaces: Forest Research Institute Malaysia

Kizhakkedathu Mathai Kochummen (6 July 1931, Kerala, India – 31 March 1999, Kuala Lumpur, Malaysia) was a Malaysian botanist. He obtained a B.Sc. from the University of Kerala in 1951. He subsequently held a number of roles at the Forest Research Institute Malaysia, eventually becoming Senior Forest Botanist.

Kochummen named over 100 plant species, including species such as Drimycarpus maximus, Mangifera khoonmengiana, Melanochyla condensata, Parishia dinghouiana and Semecarpus minutipetalus.

A number of taxa are named for him, including:

- Kochummenia
- Erythroxylum kochummenii
- Lithocarpus kochummenii

== Selected works ==
- K. M. Kochummen (1997). Tree Flora of Pasoh Forest. Forest Research Institute Malaysia. ISBN 978-9839592696.
- J. Wyatt-Smith; K. M. Kochummen (1999). Pocket Check List of Timber Trees. Forest Research Institute Malaysia. ISBN 978-9839592948.
