= Bignay =

Bignay may refer to:

- Antidesma bunius, a fruit tree

- Bignay wine, a Filipino alcoholic drink made from A. bunius berries.

- Bignay, Charente-Maritime, a commune in western France
- Bignay, Valenzuela City, a barangay in the Philippines
