= Lipote =

Lipote is a common name for closely related trees with edible berries in the Philippines. It can refer to:

- Syzygium curranii
- Syzygium polycephaloides
