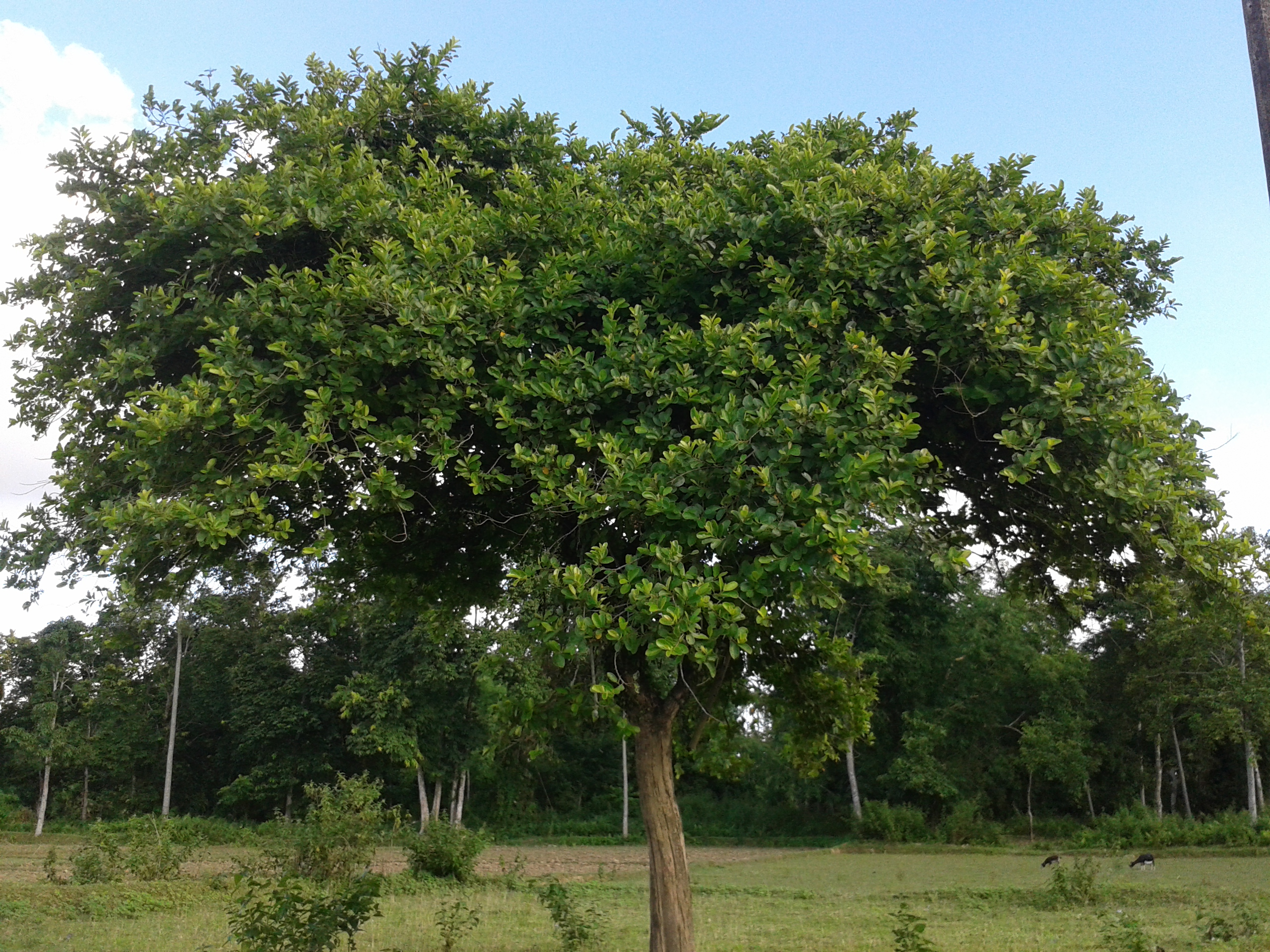

Conservation status
- Least Concern (IUCN 3.1)

Scientific classification
- Kingdom: Plantae
- Clade: Tracheophytes
- Clade: Angiosperms
- Clade: Eudicots
- Clade: Rosids
- Order: Malpighiales
- Family: Phyllanthaceae
- Genus: Antidesma
- Species: A. acidum

Binomial name
- Antidesma acidum Retz.

Synonyms
- Antidesma diandrum (Roxb.) B.Heyne ex Roth; Antidesma lanceolarium (Roxb.) Steud.; Antidesma parviflorum Ham. ex Pax & K.Hoffm.; Antidesma sylvestre Wall.; Antidesma wallichianum C.Presl; Stilago diandra Roxb.; Stilago lanceolaria Roxb.

= Antidesma acidum =

Species of plant

Antidesma acidum is a shrub or small tree that is native to an area from Java to Southwestern China and Pakistan. It is a long-lived, shade-tolerant species that is usually found under closed-canopy. The fruit is eaten in many places, the leaves in some locations. In Luang Prabang (Laos) open-air markets, the leaves are only sold alongside Russula mushrooms, to give a sour flavour to soup made from the fungi.

== Description ==
The species grows as a shrub or small tree, usually up to 6 m (20 ft) tall, rarely up to 10 m (33 ft). The young twigs have fine hairs. Obovate to elliptic-oblong papery leaves; upper surface smooth (though rarely surface is pilose), lower surface is pubescent (rarely smooth); dull colour, dries to a yellowish-green; acute to obtuse base (rarely attenuate); rounded to acute to acuminate apex (sometimes mucronate); size usually 5–10 cm (2.0–3.9 in), rarely down to 2 cm (0.8 in) and up to 21 cm (8.3 in). Terminal to axillary inflorescences. Ellipsoid smooth drupes, 4–6 by 3–4 mm, nearly terete to laterally compressed. Flowers in China from May to July, fruiting from June to November.

Distinguishing characteristics of this species are: the papery dull leaves and their size; domatia are present; the male flowers, at least, have a pubescent disc; usually 2 (rarely 1 or 3) stamens; an absent or small rudimentary ovary; size of the fruit; and female inflorescences and infructescences are usually 2–5 cm (0.8–2.0 in), rarely up to 9 cm (3.5 in).

In the southern part of the distribution range, pistillodes are always absent from the male flowers.

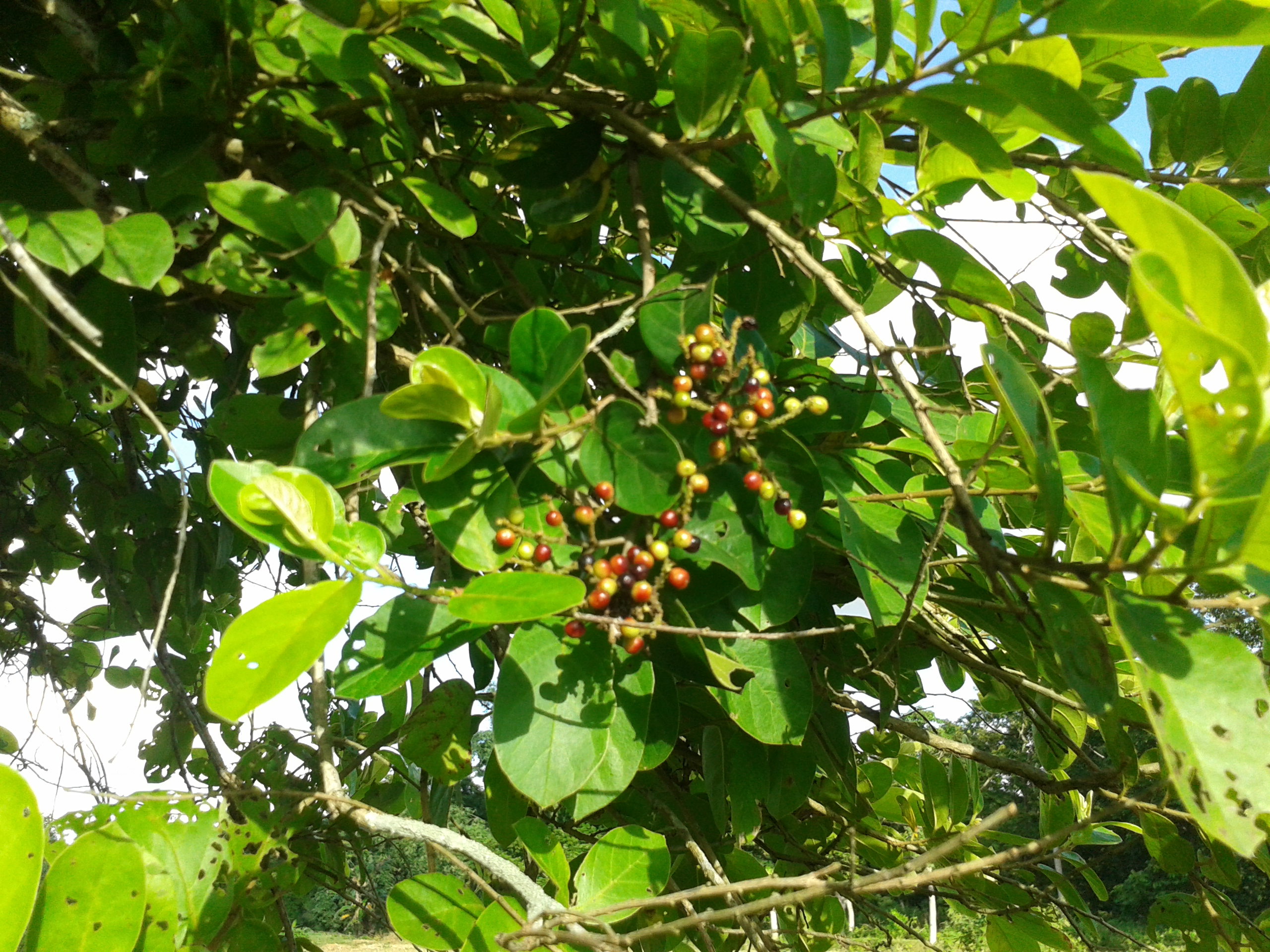
Branches and fruit

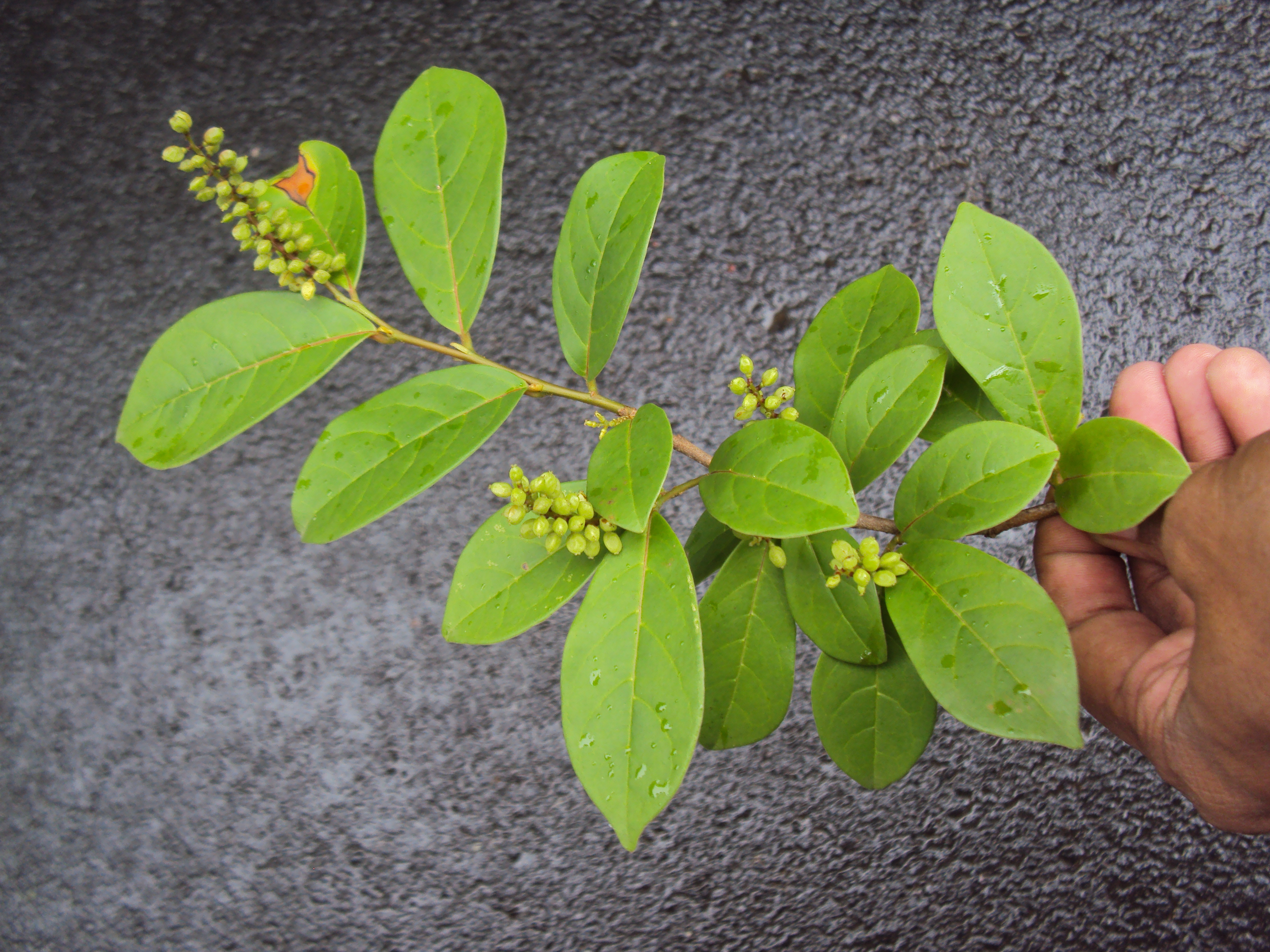
Buds and leaves

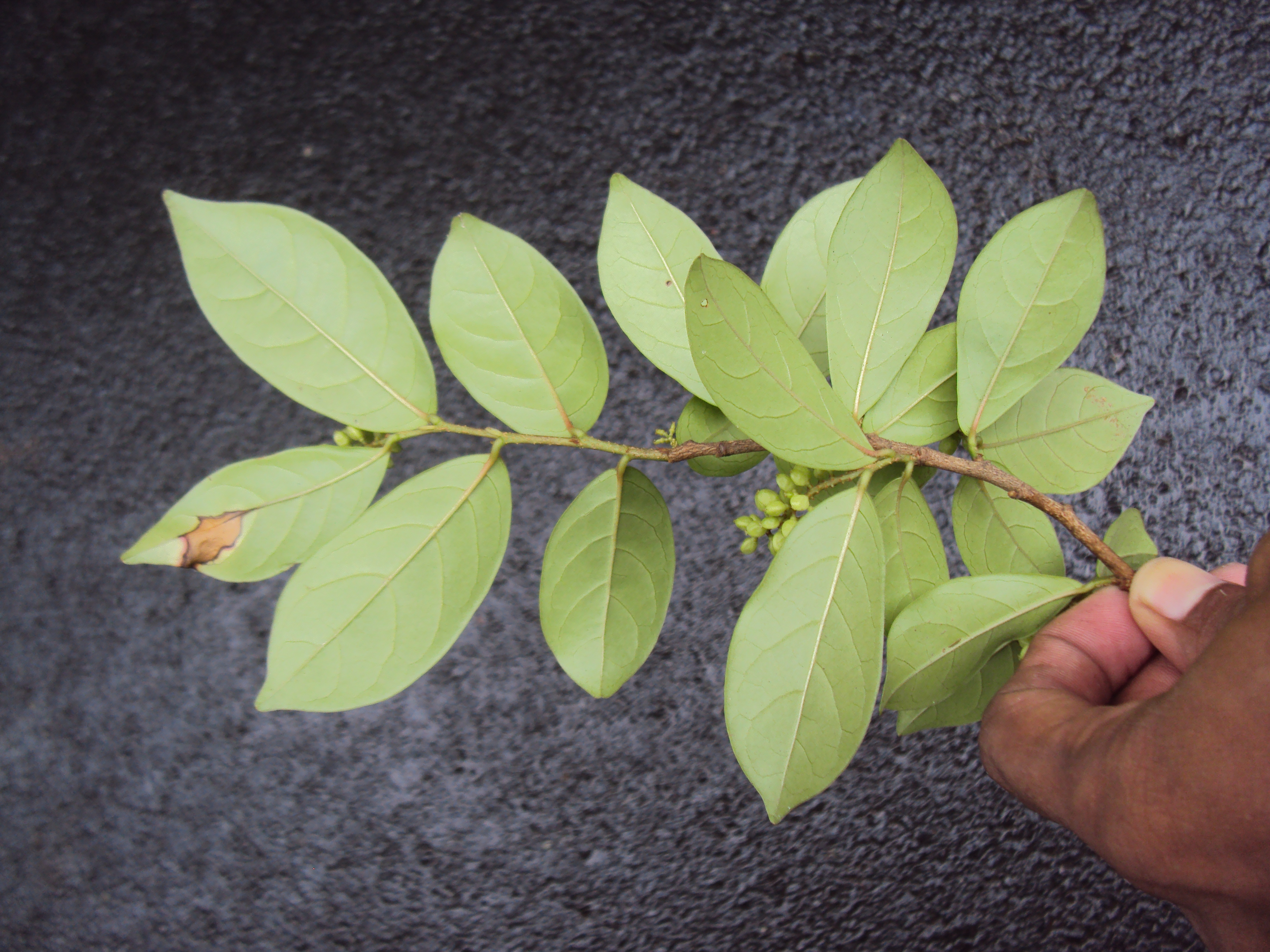
Underside of leaves

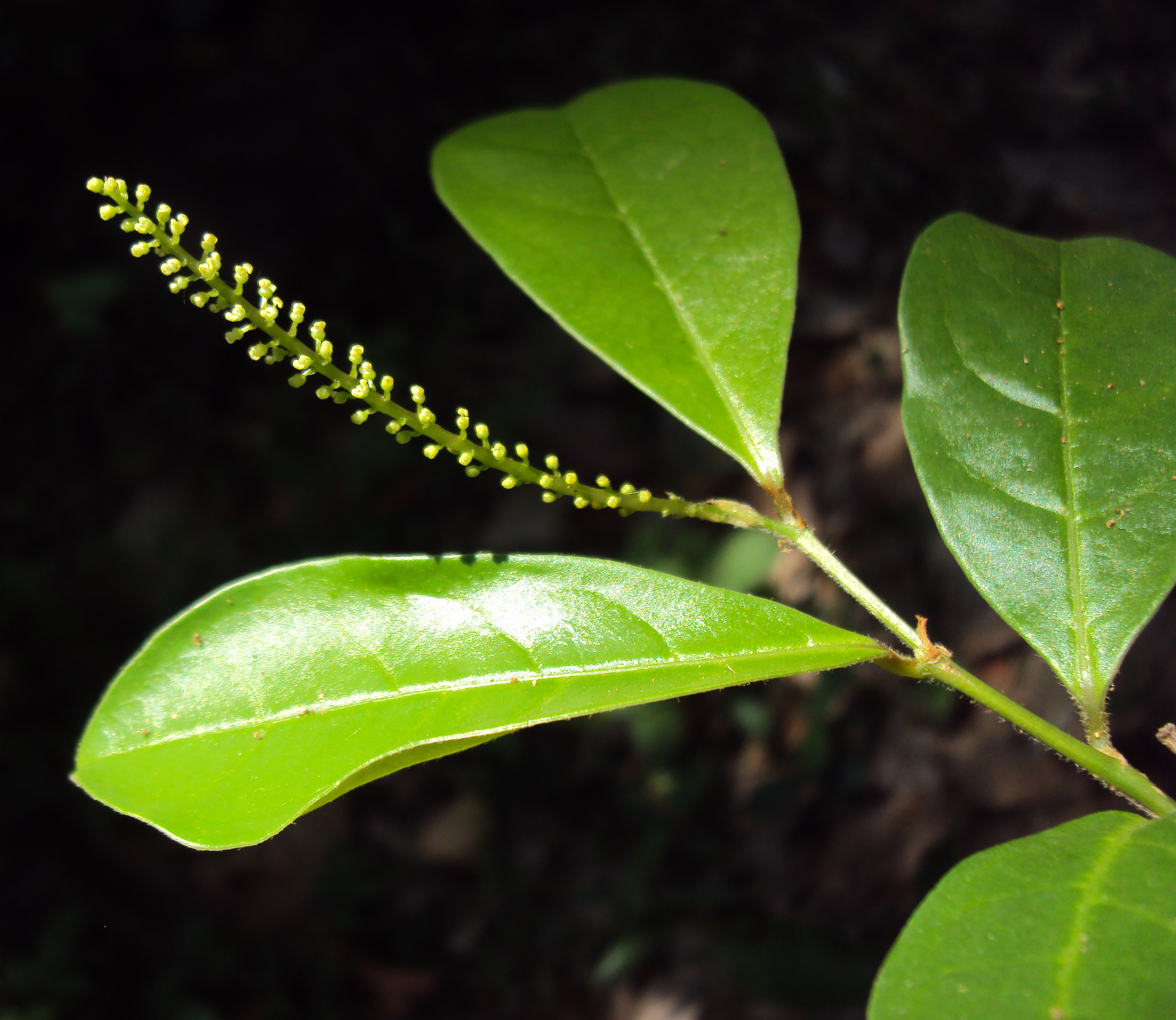
close-up of buds and leaves

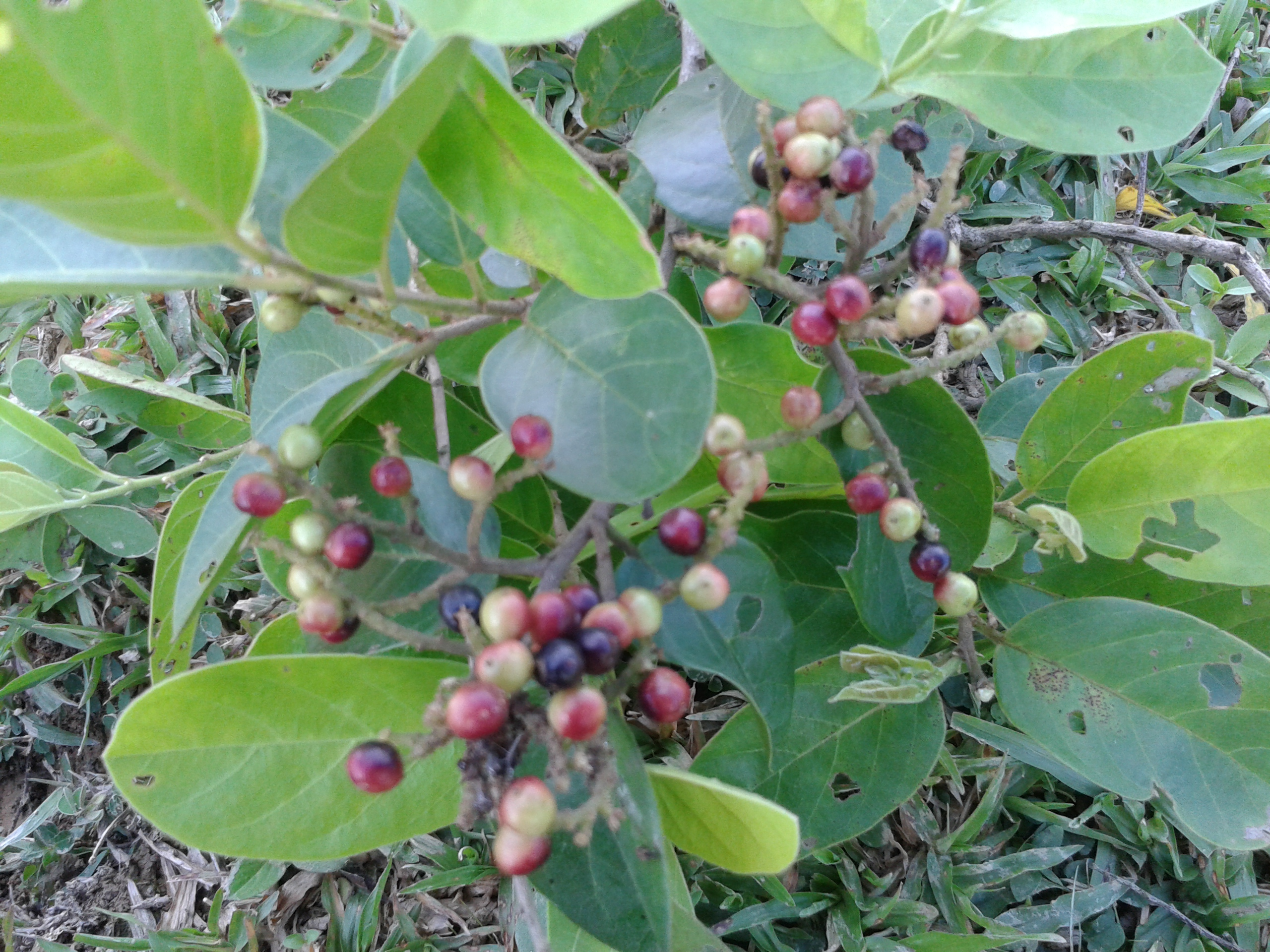
Fruit

=== Wood anatomy ===
The wood of A. acidum is diffuse porous with occasional small vessels in solitary or radial multiple arrangements (up to 5 long). The rays are heterocellular, with simple and scaliform perforations, scalariform ray-vessel pits, silica bodies are present in some cells. Septate fibres are present.

== Distribution ==
The species is native to an area of tropical and subtropical Asia from Java, Indonesia to Southwestern China to Pakistan and the Western Himalaya region. Countries and regions in which it grows are: Indonesia (Jawa); Thailand; Cambodia; Vietnam; China (Guizhou, Sichuan, Yunnan); Laos, Myanmar; India (including Nicobar Islands, Andaman Islands, Assam); Eastern Himalaya; Bangladesh; Nepal; Western Himalaya; Pakistan.

== Habitat and ecology ==
There are a number of forest types in Doi Inthanon National Park, Chiang Mai Province, northern Thailand. This taxa grows in both dry dipterocarp forest (400–1,000 m (1,300–3,300 ft) elevation) and mixed deciduous forest (480–750 m (1,570–2,460 ft) elevation) found there. The dry dipterocarp forest is dominated by Dipterocarpus tuberculatus, Quercus ramsbottomii, Shorea obtusa and Shorea siamensis. In the mixed deciduous forest, the predominant species are Lagerstroemia calyculata, Millettia leucantha, Pterocarpus macrocarpus and Tectona grandis.

In fire-influenced deciduous dipterocarp-oak forest in Thung Yai Naresuan Wildlife Sanctuary, western Thailand, the species is occasionally found under closed canopy. There are fires through the region annually or semi-annually. In this region this species is deciduous.

In Southeast Asia generally, the shrub grows in secondary forests.

The shrub/tree grows in open forests between 100 and 1,500 m (330 and 4,920 ft) altitude in China. In the Himalayan foothills it grows up to an elevation of 600 m (2,000 ft).

The plant in India is a host to the whitefly (Aleyrodidae), Dialeuronomada ixorae.

== Conservation ==
This plant has been assessed as of Least Concern for conservation by the IUCN. This is because it has an extensive distribution, and is not currently or in the foreseeable future facing major threats. However the population is severely fragmented, there is a continuing decline in the number of mature individuals, and the habitat is continually declining in area, extent and quality due to direct and indirect human actions. Least Concern is a low level of concern, but it is still a level of concern.

== Vernacular names ==
- mao soi (Thailand)
- trâumë:ch, trôm préi, taè préi (trôm="indigo", préi="wild", taè="tea", Khmer language)
- 西南五月茶, xi nan wu yue cha (Standard Chinese)
- mak mao (Lao language, Luang Prabang, north Laos)
- mau (Lao language, Champasak Province, south Laos)
- saru heloch, nekhon-tenga, nekham-tenga, abu-tenga, nekhon tenga, abutenga, soru-heloch (Asamiya, Assam, India)
- ing-sum-arong (Karbi language, Assam)
- lapha saikho, lapa saiko (Boro language, northwest Assam)
- heikum (Meitei language, Thoubal district, Manipur, NE India)
- amari (Hindi, Thoubal district, Manipur)
- chouding, dieng-japue (Khasi language, Meghalaya, NE India)
- aburok (Garo/A-chikku, northeast India)
- kantjer (Róng language: Sikkim, West Bengal; Bhutan; Nepal)
- mathagach, mutta, archal, amtua-sag (Bengali language)
- matha arak (Santali language, Cooch Behar district, West Bengal, NE India
- pella-gumudu (Telugu language, south India)
- asaripuli, keathekkayyaa (Tamil language, south India)
- arippazhachedi, sirupulli, areepazham, asaripuli (Malayalam), S India)
- bilikoomme, karrihulipa, sannagooje (Kannada, south India)
- khatua, sabheli-bhaja, amli, aamari, dhakki (Hindi language)
- ghondurili, mikir, ing-sun-arong (Marathi, northwest India)
- amlola (Tharu, Uttar Pradesh, northwest India)
- matha-arak (Sant Bhasha, northern India)
- rohitaka (English, India)
- archal, अचरच (Nepali language)
- himalcherry (English, Nepal)
- amtu (Koshur, Jammu and Kashmir, northwest India)
- nuniari (Urdu, northwest India, Pakistan)
- kundui, ghondurili, manmuri, areepazham, asari puli, nuniari (other languages, India)

== Uses ==
The people who live in the Phu Khiao Wildlife Sanctuary, Chaiyaphum Province, northeast Thailand, in their folkloric medicine to treat fever, drink a water decoction of the root of this species.

Further north, in the Bueng Khong Long Non-hunting Area, Bueng Kan Province, northeastern Thailand, people harvest and eat the ripe wild fruits from March to September.

In Cambodia, the fleshy fruit is eaten, and in local medicine an infusion of the root is given to young mothers as a tonic.

The Bunong people of Mondulkiri Province, northeastern Cambodia, collect the wild fruits daily for food, and occasionally use the plant in their ethnomedicine to treat cough.

When establishing Wurfbainia villosa, "medical cardamom", plantations in Phongsaly Province, northern Laos, in an area where shifting cultivation is dominant, farmers avoid new fallow areas that have sun-loving fast-growing plants, as these affect the cardamom plants. In fallow that is over five years old these short-lived species are replaced by long-lived species such as A. acidum, Alstonia scholaris and Albizia chinensis, which provide shade for the cardamom.

At the open air markets of Luang Prabang, north Laos, the leaves of this species are only sold alongside Russula mushrooms. They are regarded as a special herb to provide a sour element in the traditional soup made from the mushroom. The Russula mushrooms are usually sold as a mixture of species, including Russula alboareolata, Russula delica, Russula faustiana, Russula integra, Russula paludosa, Russula subfoetens, Russula virescens, and other species. The fruit are also sold, both sour (unripe) and sweet (ripe).

A variety of trees grow in rice fields in Champasak Province, southern Laos. Fruit trees, including this species, are common in fields. This species provides fruit and medicine. The Boro of Assam relish the mild sour leaves of this plant and combine it with fish or meat to make curries. Amongst people who are known by the external designation of Loi in the Thoubal district of Manipur, northeast India, the plant is used in their traditional ethnomedicine to treat diabetes.

In the Cooch Behar district of West Bengal, northeast India, the ripe fruit of the wild plant are eaten by children.

The young tender leaves of the plant are gathered by "Tribal" and other rural people of Odisha, south India, to be eaten as vegetables, as are a large range of other wild plants. They are fried if oil is available, otherwise boiled with salt, and then served as a side-item with rice.

The ripe fruit are eaten by the Tharu people living in Dudhwa National Park, Uttar Pradesh, northwest India (on the Nepal border).

The plant is cited as an agricultural species in Nepal.

== History ==
The species was named in 1788 by the Swiss chemist, botanist and entomologist Anders Jahan Retzius (1742–1821). He influenced a number of scientists in both his family and students. The description of the taxa was published in his work Observationes Botanicae.
