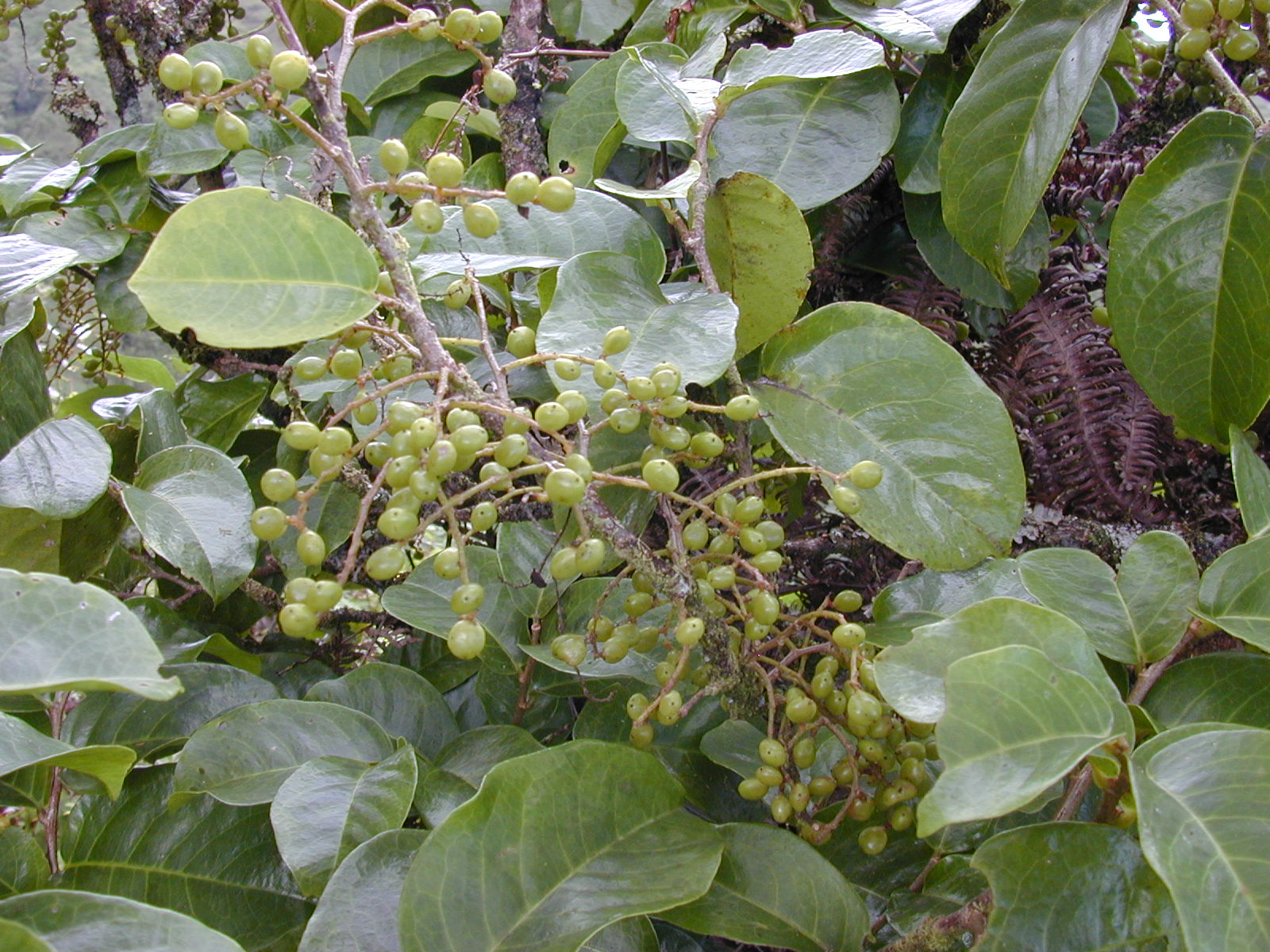

Conservation status
- Least Concern (IUCN 3.1)

Scientific classification
- Kingdom: Plantae
- Clade: Tracheophytes
- Clade: Angiosperms
- Clade: Eudicots
- Clade: Rosids
- Order: Malpighiales
- Family: Phyllanthaceae
- Genus: Antidesma
- Species: A. platyphyllum

Binomial name
- Antidesma platyphyllum H.Mann, 1867

= Antidesma platyphyllum =

Species of tree

Antidesma platyphyllum is a species of flowering tree in the leafflower family, Phyllanthaceae, that is endemic to Hawaii. Common names include hame, haʻā, mehame, hamehame, mēhamehame, and haʻāmaile. It inhabits coastal mesic forests, mixed mesic forests, wet forests, and bogs at elevations of 150–1,525 m (492–5,003 ft) on all main islands.
