= Antidesma pyrifolium =

Conservation status
- Vulnerable (IUCN 2.3)

Scientific classification
- Kingdom: Plantae
- Clade: Tracheophytes
- Clade: Angiosperms
- Clade: Eudicots
- Clade: Rosids
- Order: Malpighiales
- Family: Phyllanthaceae
- Genus: Antidesma
- Species: A. pyrifolium

Binomial name
- Antidesma pyrifolium Muell.Arg.

Synonyms
- Antidesma brunneum Hook.f.; Antidesma montanum Thwaites [Illegitimate]

Species of flowering plant

Antidesma pyrifolium is a species of plant in the family Phyllanthaceae. It is endemic to Sri Lanka.
