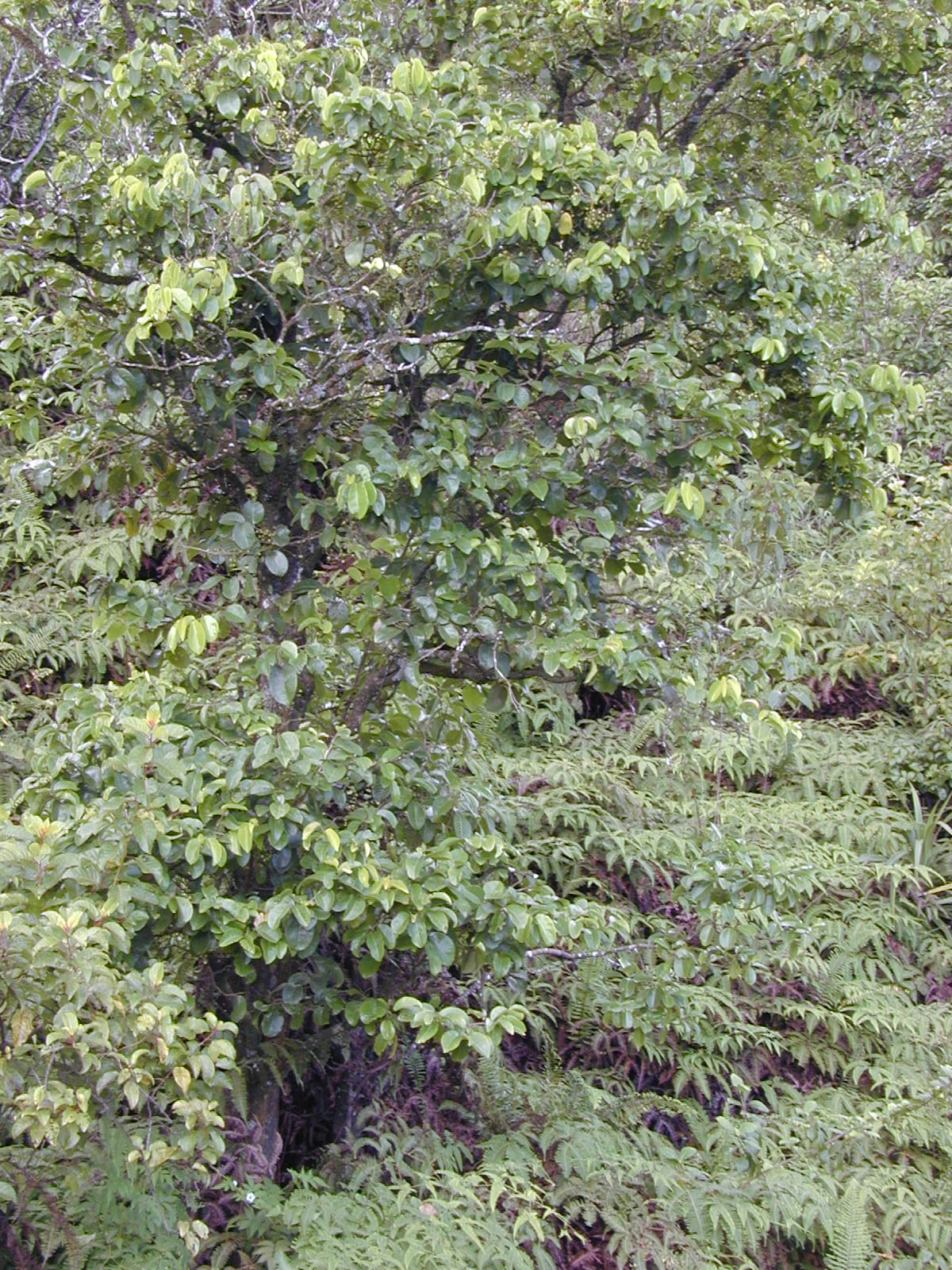
- Hame (A. platyphyllum) - habit

Scientific classification
- Kingdom: Plantae
- Clade: Tracheophytes
- Clade: Angiosperms
- Clade: Eudicots
- Clade: Rosids
- Order: Malpighiales
- Family: Phyllanthaceae
- Subfamily: Antidesmatoideae
- Tribe: Antidesmateae
- Subtribe: Antidesmatinae
- Genus: Antidesma; L. 1753 not Wall. 1832

Type species
- Antidesma alexiteria L.

Synonyms
- Bestram Adans.; Coulejia Dennst.; Minutalia Fenzl; Rhytis Lour.; Rubina Noronha; Stilago L.

= Antidesma =

Genus of flowering plants

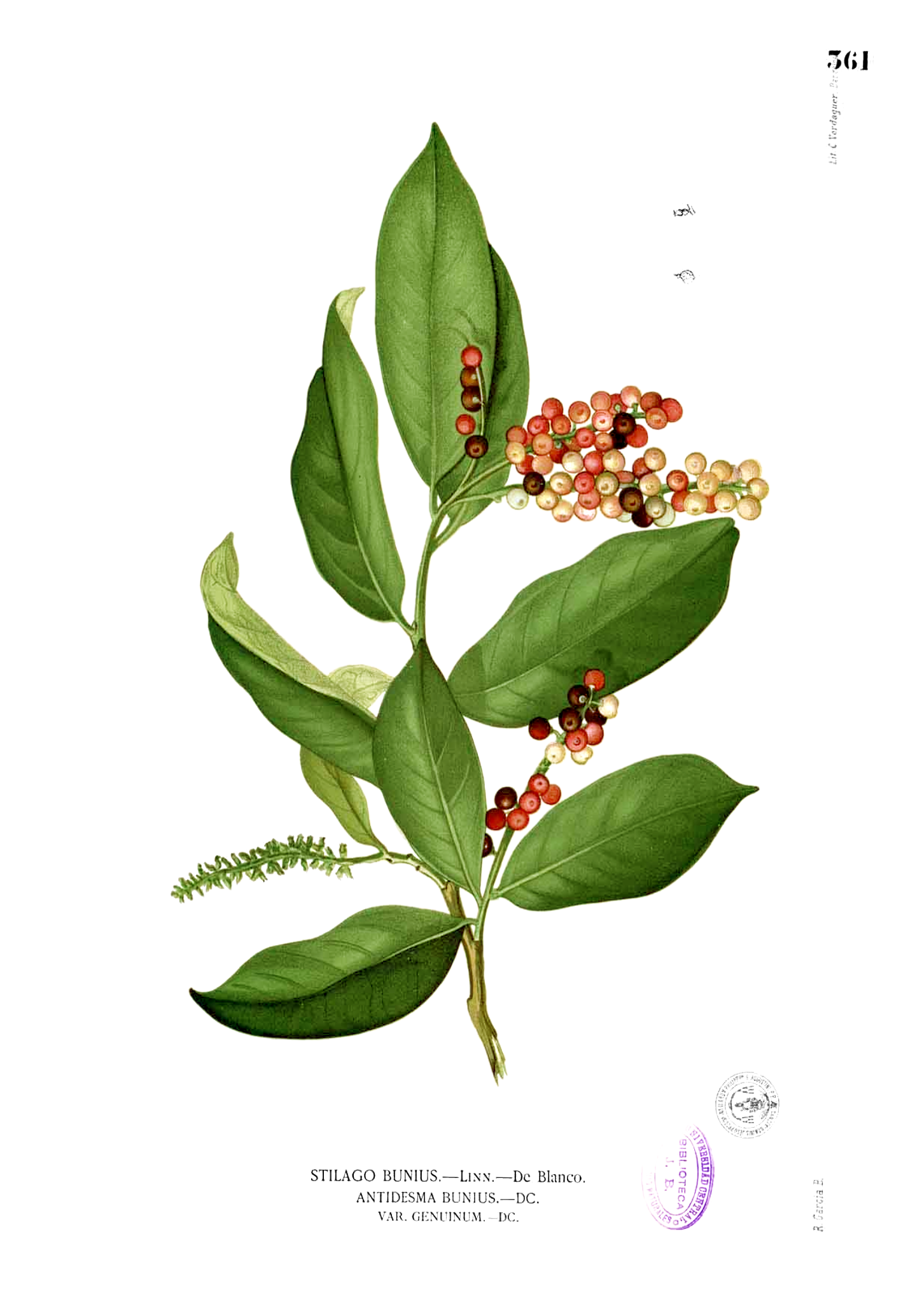
Bignay (A. bunius)

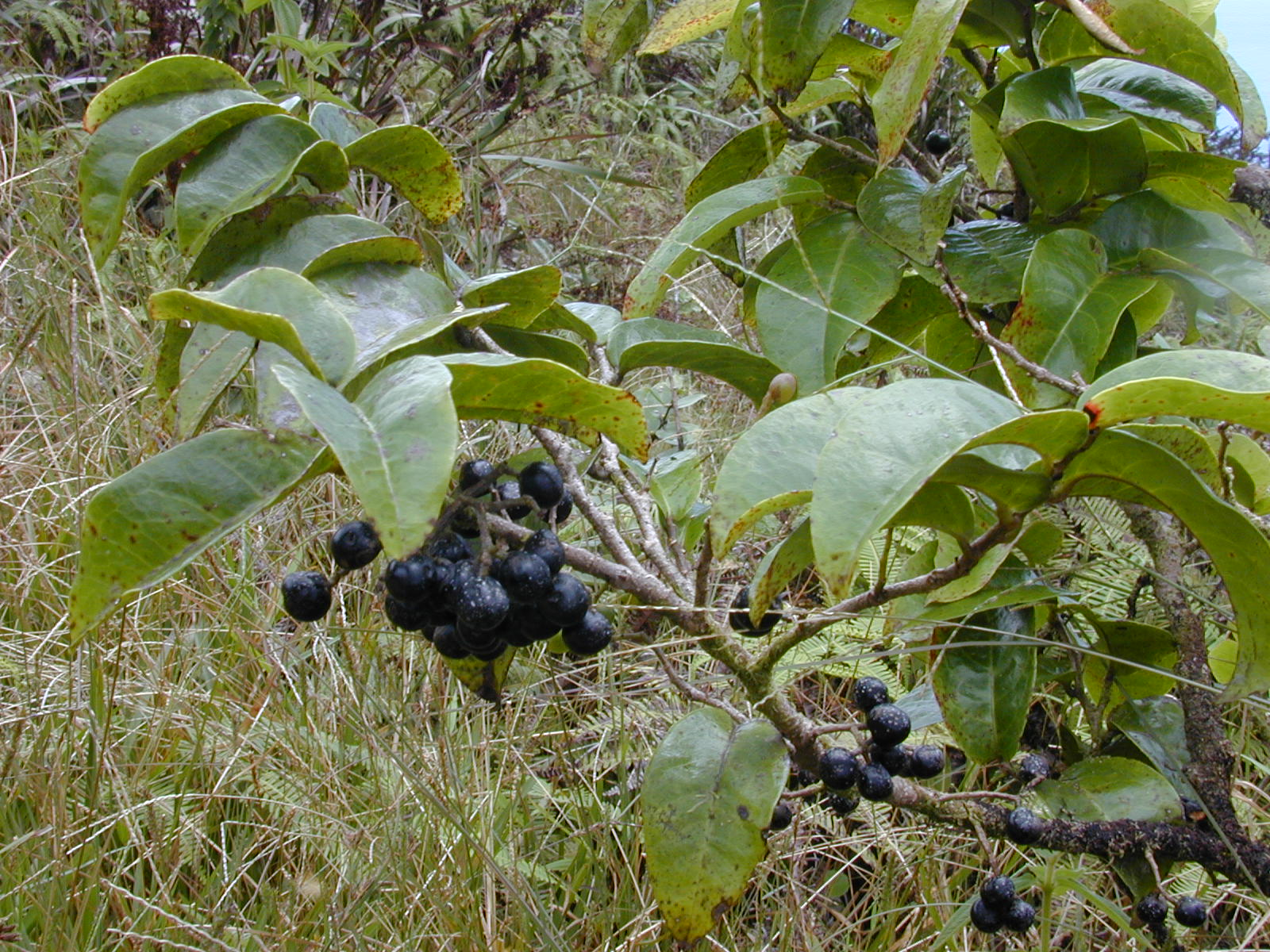
Hame (A. platyphyllum) - ripe berries

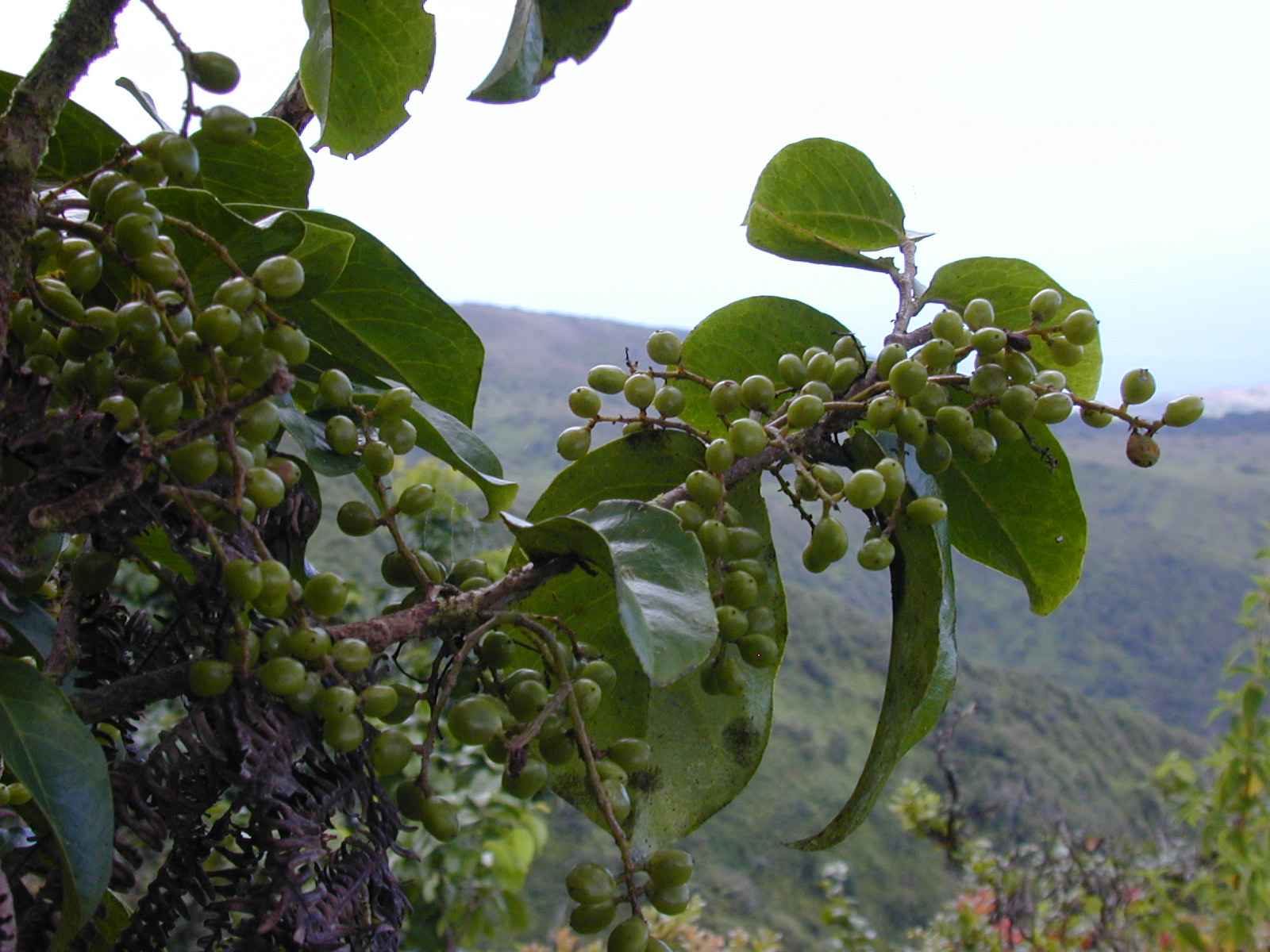
Hame (A. platyphyllum) - unripe fruit

Antidesma is a genus of tropical plant in the family Phyllanthaceae formally described by Linnaeus in 1753. It is native to tropical Africa, S + E + SE Asia, Australia, and various oceanic islands. The greatest diversity occurs in Southeast Asia.

== Description ==
Antidesma is a variable genus which may be short and shrubby or tall and erect, approaching 30 metres in height. It has large oval shaped leathery evergreen leaves up to about 20 centimetres long and seven wide. The flowers have a strong, somewhat unpleasant scent. The staminate flowers are arranged in small bunches and the pistillate flowers grow on long racemes which will become the long strands of fruit. The fruits are spherical and just under a centimeter wide, hanging singly or paired in long, heavy bunches. They are white when immature and gradually turn red, then black. When they are still white they have sour and astringent taste, sour taste when they are red and have sweet and sour taste when they are black.

The evergreen (sometimes deciduous) simple leaves have fine hairs and show no glands. They grow in an alternate arrangement, with entire, symmetrical blades. They are connected to the stem with a petiole (leaf stalk) and stipules (appendage at the base of a leaf stalk).

The flowers grow in a raceme, with 1 bract per flower, on a short pedicel (tiny stalk, supporting a single flower). Their color is light yellowish green, but may turn red when mature. These plants are dioecious, i.e. unisexual, with male and female flowers on separate plants. There are 3 to 8 fused sepals, but no petals. The male flowers have 2 to 8 stamens, but no pistils. The female flowers have 2 to 6 stigmas. They have a 1-locular ovary with 2 ovules.

The globose to ellipsoid fruits resemble a drupe. Their color varies from green to white, red and black. The fleshy and juicy fruits are edible with a sour to bitter sweet taste. Some individuals find Antidesma bunius berries to have a bitter taste. Those who detect this bitter taste (about 15% of subjects tested) cannot taste PTC, and similarly those who can taste PTC (about 68% of the subjects) cannot taste any bitterness in Antidesma bunius, while a minority of people cannot taste bitterness in either.

== Species ==
There are 101 accepted species in the genus, as of May 2021. They are:

- Antidesma acidum Retz. - Indian Subcontinent, SE Asia, Java, S China
- Antidesma alexiteria L. - S India, Sri Lanka
- Antidesma ambiguum Pax & K.Hoffm. - Yunnan, Vietnam
- Antidesma annamense Gagnep.- Vietnam
- Antidesma baccatum Airy Shaw - New Guinea, Maluku
- Antidesma bhargavae Chakrab. & N.P.Balakr. - Andaman & Nicobar
- Antidesma brachybotrys Airy Shaw - Malaysia, Borneo
- Antidesma brevipes Petra Hoffm. - Sulawesi
- Antidesma bunius (L.) Spreng. - Queensland, Christmas I, New Guinea, SE Asia, Indian Sub., China
- Antidesma catanduanense Merr. - Catanduanes
- Antidesma celebicum Miq. - Sulawesi, Timor, Maluku
- Antidesma chalaranthum Airy Shaw - Papua New Guinea
- Antidesma chonmon Gagnep. - Yunnan, Vietnam
- Antidesma cochinchinense Gagnep. - Cambodia, S Vietnam
- Antidesma comptum Tul. - Tamil Nadu
- Antidesma concinnum Airy Shaw - Papua New Guinea
- Antidesma contractum J.J.Sm. - New Guinea
- Antidesma coriaceum Tul. - Malaysia, Sumatra, Borneo, Nicobar Is
- Antidesma costulatum Pax & K.Hoffm. - Sichuan, Yunnan
- Antidesma cruciforme Gage - Peninsular Malaysia
- Antidesma curranii Merr. - Philippines
- Antidesma cuspidatum Müll.Arg. - Malaysia, Borneo, Sumatra
- Antidesma dallachyanum Baill. - Queensland
- Antidesma digitaliforme Tul. - Philippines
- Antidesma eberhardtii Gagnep. - Laos, Vietnam
- Antidesma edule Merr. - Philippines
- Antidesma elassophyllum A.C.Sm. - Viti Levu, Vanua Levu
- Antidesma elbertii Petra Hoffm. - Maluku, Sulawesi, Lesser Sunda Is
- Antidesma erostre F.Muell. - New Guinea, Queensland
- Antidesma excavatum Miq. - Borneo, Sulawesi, Maluku, Philippines, Papuasia, Micronesia
- Antidesma ferrugineum Airy Shaw - Papua New Guinea
- Antidesma forbesii Pax & K.Hoffm. - S Thailand, W Malaysia, Sumatra
- Antidesma fordii Hemsl. - Laos, Vietnam, S China
- Antidesma fruticosum (Lour.) Müll.Arg. - Vietnam
- Antidesma fruticulosum Kurz - Myanmar
- Antidesma ghaesembilla Gaertn. - S China, S + SE Asia, Papuasia, N Australia
- Antidesma gillespieanum A.C.Sm. - Fiji
- Antidesma hainanense Merr. - Laos, Vietnam, S China
- Antidesma helferi Hook.f. - S Myanmar, S Thailand, W Malaysia, N Sumatra
- Antidesma heterophyllum Blume - Java, Lesser Sunda Is, Sulawesi, Maluku
- Antidesma insulare Gillespie - Viti Levu
- Antidesma japonicum Siebold & Zucc. - China, Japan, SE Asia, Philippines, Peninsular Malaysia
- Antidesma jayasuriyae Chakrab. & M.Gangop. - Sri Lanka
- Antidesma jucundum Airy Shaw - Papua New Guinea
- Antidesma × kapuae Rock - South Kona
- Antidesma keralense Chakrab. & M.Gangop. - Kerala
- Antidesma khasianum Hook.f. - Meghalaya
- Antidesma kunstleri Gage - Perak
- Antidesma laciniatum Müll.Arg. - W + C + E Africa
- Antidesma laurifolium Airy Shaw - Thailand, Cambodia, Johor
- Antidesma leucocladon Hook.f. - S Thailand, W Malaysia, Sumatra
- Antidesma leucopodum Miq. - S Thailand, W Malaysia, Sumatra, Borneo, Philippines
- Antidesma macgregorii C.B.Rob. - Philippines
- Antidesma maclurei Merr. - Hainan, Vietnam
- Antidesma madagascariense Lam. - Madagascar, Comoros, Mauritius, Réunion
- Antidesma membranaceum Müll.Arg. - tropical + southern Africa
- Antidesma messianianum Guillaumin - New Caledonia
- Antidesma microcarpum Elmer - Philippines
- Antidesma minus Blume - Sumatra, W. Java
- Antidesma montanum Blume - China, S + SE Asia, New Guinea, Queensland
- Antidesma montis-silam Airy Shaw - Sabah
- Antidesma myriocarpum Airy Shaw - New Guinea
- Antidesma neurocarpum Miq. - S Thailand, W Malaysia, Borneo, Sumatra
- Antidesma nienkui Merr. & Chun - Guangdong, Hainan, N Thailand
- Antidesma nigricans Tul. Bhutan, Arunachal Pradesh, Assam, Myanmar
- Antidesma oblongum (Hutch.) Keay - Liberia, Ivory Coast
- Antidesma orthogyne (Hook.f.) Airy Shaw - S Thailand, Peninsular Malaysia
- Antidesma pachybotryum Pax & K.Hoffm. - Cameroon
- Antidesma pachystachys Hook.f. - Peninsular Malaysia
- Antidesma pacificum Müll.Arg. - Vanua Levu, Moala
- Antidesma pahangense Airy Shaw - Peninsular Malaysia
- Antidesma parvifolium F.Muell. - Queensland, Northern Territory
- Antidesma pendulum Hook.f. - S Thailand, Peninsular Malaysia, Borneo, Sumatra
- Antidesma petiolatum Airy Shaw - New Guinea
- Antidesma phanrangense Gagnep. - Vietnam
- Antidesma platyphyllum H.Mann - Hawaii
- Antidesma pleuricum Tul. - Taiwan, Philippines
- Antidesma poilanei Gagnep. - S Vietnam
- Antidesma polystylum Airy Shaw - Borneo
- Antidesma pulvinatum Hillebr. - Hawaii
- Antidesma puncticulatum Miq. - Sri Lanka, Andaman Is, SE Asia, Philippines, Borneo, Sumatra
- Antidesma pyrifolium Müll.Arg. - Sri Lanka
- Antidesma rhynchophyllum K.Schum. - New Guinea
- Antidesma riparium Airy Shaw - Borneo, Sulawesi, Philippines, New Guinea
- Antidesma roxburghii Wall. ex Tul.} - Arunachal Pradesh to Myanmar
- Antidesma rufescens Tul. - tropical Africa
- Antidesma sinuatum Benth. - Queensland
- Antidesma sootepense Craib - Thailand, Yunnan, Laos, Cambodia
- Antidesma spatulifolium Airy Shaw - New Guinea, Tanimbar
- Antidesma stipulare Blume - Indonesia, Malaysia, Philippines
- Antidesma subbicolor Gagnep. - Vietnam
- Antidesma subcordatum Merr. - Philippines, Lesser Sunda Is
- Antidesma tetrandrum Blume - Andaman & Nicobar, Bali, Java, Sumatra
- Antidesma tomentosum Blume - Nicobar Is, S Thailand, Malaysia, Indonesia
- Antidesma tonkinense Gagnep. - N Vietnam
- Antidesma trichophyllum A.C.Sm. - Viti Levu
- Antidesma vaccinioides Airy Shaw - Papua New Guinea
- Antidesma velutinosum Blume - E Himalayas, Myanmar, Thailand, Malaysia, W Indonesia
- Antidesma velutinum Tul. - Bangladesh, Andaman Is, SE Asia
- Antidesma venenosum J.J.Sm. - Borneo
- Antidesma venosum E.Mey. ex Tul. - Africa, China, SE Asia
- Antidesma vogelianum Müll.Arg. - tropical Africa

The following taxa have been revised:

- Antidesma obliquinervium Merr., now synonym for Antidesma montanum var. montanum
- Antidesma pentandrum (Blanco) Merr., now synonym for Antidesma montanum var. montanum
- Antidesma subolivaceum Elmer, now synonym for Antidesma tomentosum var. tomentosum
