= Antidesma alexiteria =

Scientific classification
- Kingdom: Plantae
- Clade: Tracheophytes
- Clade: Angiosperms
- Clade: Eudicots
- Clade: Rosids
- Order: Malpighiales
- Family: Phyllanthaceae
- Genus: Antidesma
- Species: A. alexiteria

Binomial name
- Antidesma alexiteria L.

Synonyms
- Antidesma alexiteria Gaertn. [Invalid]; Antidesma zeylanicum Lam.; Antidesma zeylanicum C.Presl [Illegitimate]

Species of flowering plant

Antidesma alexiteria is a species of plant in the family Phyllanthaceae. It was early classified as a genus within family Euphorbiaceae, but later moved into family Phyllanthaceae. It is endemic to Southern India and Sri Lanka. It is a small understory shrub with maximum height of 8m. Fruits are red in color. In Sri Lanka, the plant is known as "Heen embilla - හීන් ඇඹිල්‍ල", which is used in Ayurvedic purposes. leaves of A. alexiteria are used as an antidote for many snake bites, and bark of the root for dysentery treatments.
