= Antidesma tomentosum =

Scientific classification
- Kingdom: Plantae
- Clade: Tracheophytes
- Clade: Angiosperms
- Clade: Eudicots
- Clade: Rosids
- Order: Malpighiales
- Family: Phyllanthaceae
- Genus: Antidesma
- Species: A. tomentosum

Binomial name
- Antidesma tomentosum Blume

Synonyms
- Antidesma subolivaceum Elmer

Species of flowering plant

Antidesma tomentosum is a species of plant in the family Phyllanthaceae. It is native to Borneo, Java, Peninsular Malaysia, the Nicobar Islands, the Philippines, Sulawesi, Sumatra and Thailand.
