= Antidesma cruciforme =

Conservation status
- Conservation Dependent (IUCN 2.3)

Scientific classification
- Kingdom: Plantae
- Clade: Tracheophytes
- Clade: Angiosperms
- Clade: Eudicots
- Clade: Rosids
- Order: Malpighiales
- Family: Phyllanthaceae
- Genus: Antidesma
- Species: A. cruciforme

Binomial name
- Antidesma cruciforme Gage

Species of flowering plant

Antidesma cruciforme is a species of plant in the family Phyllanthaceae. It is endemic to Peninsular Malaysia.
