= Antidesma jayasuriyae =

Scientific classification
- Kingdom: Plantae
- Clade: Embryophytes
- Clade: Tracheophytes
- Clade: Angiosperms
- Clade: Eudicots
- Clade: Rosids
- Order: Malpighiales
- Family: Phyllanthaceae
- Genus: Antidesma
- Species: A. jayasuriyae

Binomial name
- Antidesma jayasuriyae T. Chakrabarty. & M. Gangopadhyay, 2000

Species of flowering plant

Antidesma jayasuriyae, is a species of plant in the family Phyllanthaceae. It is endemic to island of Sri Lanka.
