= Antidesma puncticulatum =

Scientific classification
- Kingdom: Plantae
- Clade: Tracheophytes
- Clade: Angiosperms
- Clade: Eudicots
- Clade: Rosids
- Order: Malpighiales
- Family: Phyllanthaceae
- Genus: Antidesma
- Species: A. puncticulatum

Binomial name
- Antidesma puncticulatum Miq.

Synonyms
- Antidesma bunius var. thwaitesianum (Müll.Arg.) Trimen; Antidesma thwaitesianum Müll.Arg.

Species of plant

Antidesma puncticulatum, known as mao luang, is a species of plant in the family Phyllanthaceae. It was previously classified as a genus within family Euphorbiaceae, but later moved into family Phyllanthaceae. It is native to South Asia and South-east Asian countries.
