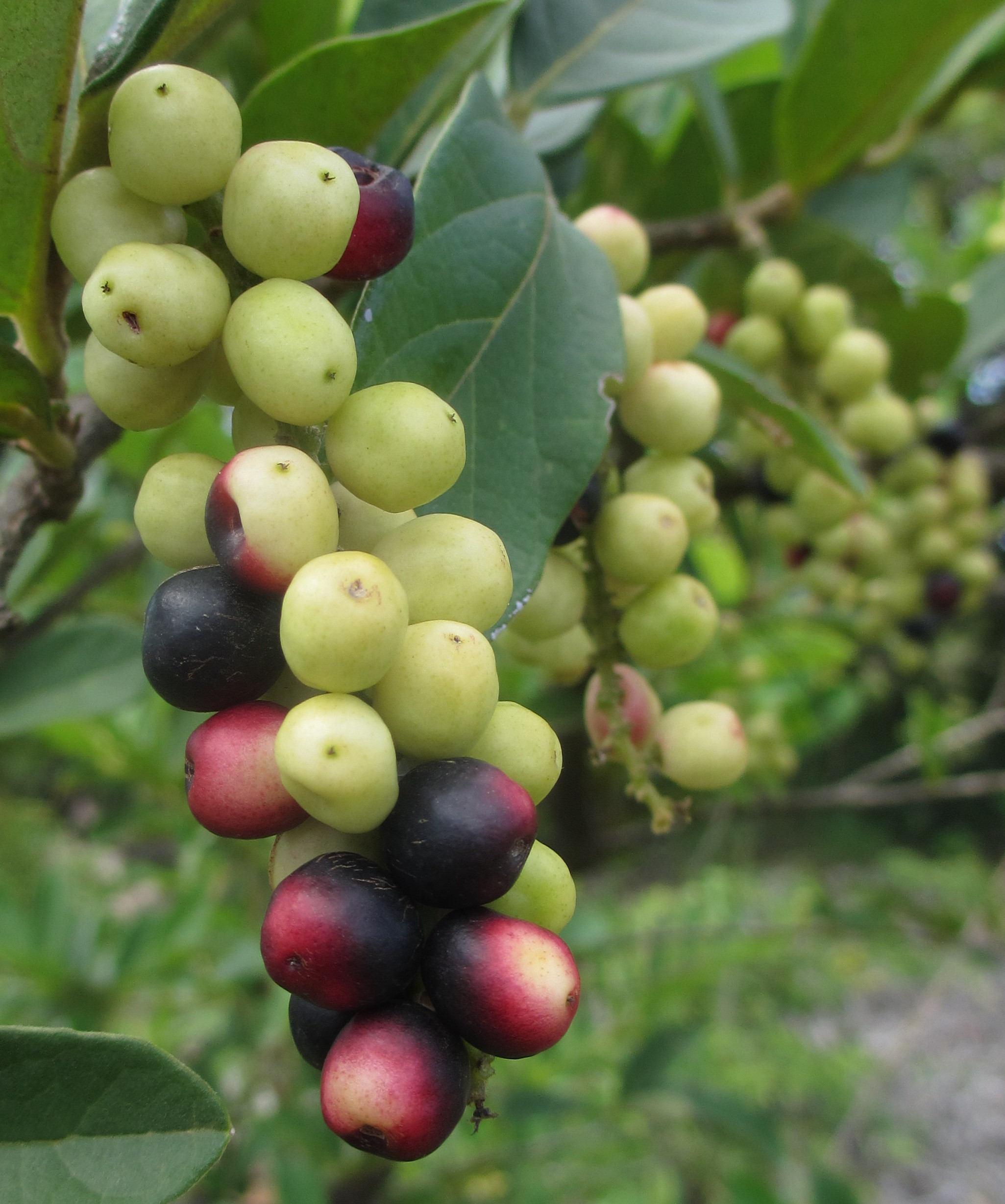

Scientific classification
- Kingdom: Plantae
- Clade: Tracheophytes
- Clade: Angiosperms
- Clade: Eudicots
- Clade: Rosids
- Order: Malpighiales
- Family: Phyllanthaceae
- Genus: Antidesma
- Species: A. venosum

Binomial name
- Antidesma venosum E.Mey. ex Tul.

Synonyms
- Antidesma natalense Harv.

= Antidesma venosum =

Tassel-berry

Species of flowering plant

Antidesma venosum, commonly known as the tassel-berry, is a species of small dioecious tree in the family Phyllanthaceae. It is native to Africa, China and Indochina.

Numerous small, sessile flowers are produced on drooping catkin-like spikes, which are about 10 cm long. The flowers produce an unpleasant smell, and the tree is in fruit for more than a month during late summer. Each small, oval-shaped fruit measures about 8 x 4 mm in size. They are initially fleshy green, and change to bright red and eventually purplish black as they ripen. The fruit are utilized by many species of animals.
