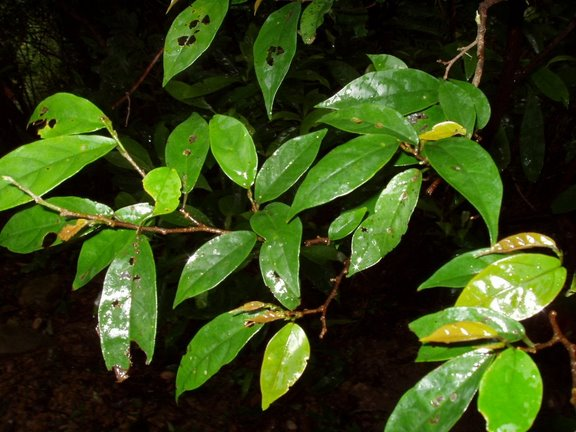

Conservation status
- Least Concern (IUCN 3.1)

Scientific classification
- Kingdom: Plantae
- Clade: Embryophytes
- Clade: Tracheophytes
- Clade: Spermatophytes
- Clade: Angiosperms
- Clade: Eudicots
- Clade: Rosids
- Order: Malpighiales
- Family: Phyllanthaceae
- Genus: Antidesma
- Species: A. japonicum

Binomial name
- Antidesma japonicum Siebold & Zucc.

Synonyms
- Antidesma acuminatissimum Quisumb. & Merr.; A. acutisepalum Hayata; A. cambodianum Gagnep.; A. delicatulum Hutch.; A. filipes Hand.-Mazz.; A. gracillimum Gage; A. hiiranense Hayata; A. ambiguum Pax & K.Hoffmann); A. japonicum var. acutisepalum (Hayata) Hurusawa; A. japonicum var. densiflorum Hurusawa; A. neriifolium Pax & K. Hoffmann; A. pentandrum Merr. var. hiiranense (Hayata) Hurus.

= Antidesma japonicum =

Species of flowering plant

Antidesma japonicum is a shrub in the family Phyllanthaceae. It is found in Southeast Asia, China and Japan. It provides food and fuel. A. japonicum has two accepted varieties: the nominate variety, A. japonicum var. japonicum; and the robustius variety, A. japonicum var. robustius.

== Description ==
In China, the nominate variety grows as shrub or small tree, some 2 to 8 m tall. Its light olive to greyish-green leaves are elliptic, oblong-elliptic, oblong-lanceolate, even obovate, some 3.5–13 cm by 1.5–4.5 cm in size. The inflorescences grow terminally or axillary. The drupes are a laterally compressed ellipsoid shape, 5–6 by 4–6 mm in size. It flowers from April to August, and fruits from June to September. In Cambodia it is described as a winding shrub some 1–2 m tall.

Antidesma japonicum var. robustius is endemic to eastern Thailand. The most obvious difference with the nominate variety is that the midrib of the leaves is distinctly raised adaxially. It occurs in the Dry Evergreen Forest formations of Pak Thong Chai District, Nakhon Ratchasima Province, at about 350-500m. It is given a Rare (Globally) status in Thailand.

== Habitat ==
Growing in open forests in humid valleys of southern and eastern China, it occurs rarely in scrub on limestone, and is found at elevations of 300–1700m. In Cambodia it occurs in secondary forest formations.

== Distribution ==
It is found in Peninsular Malaysia; Thailand; Myanmar; China (Tibet, Qinghai, Sichuan, Hubei, Anhui, Jiangsu, Zhejiang, Jiangxi, Fujian, Guangdong, Hunan, Guangxi, Hainan, Guizhou, Yunnan); Japan (including Nansei-shoto); Taiwan; Philippines (Luzon and Mindanao); Vietnam; and Cambodia.

== Conservation ==
Populations are severely fragmented and there is a continuing decline of mature individuals. However the very wide distribution of the tree, its large population, its seemingly not currently experiencing major threats while no significant future threats have been identified, means that IUCN assesses it as Least Concern.

== Vernacular names ==
- mao chaep (Thai)
- 酸味子, suan wei zi (Chinese)
- yama-hihatsu-zoku (Japanese)
- chòi mòi nhật (Vietnamese).
- trormouch, mchoo trormouch (Kuy/Khmer)
- chungkuë:ng ândoëk' (="knee of turtle", Khmer).

== Uses ==
The fruit is edible and the stem and branches make excellent firewood.

Amongst Kuy- and Khmer-speaking people living in the same villages in Stung Treng and Preah Vihear provinces of north-central Cambodia, the tree is used as source of medicine and food, and as a component in ritual/magical activities.
