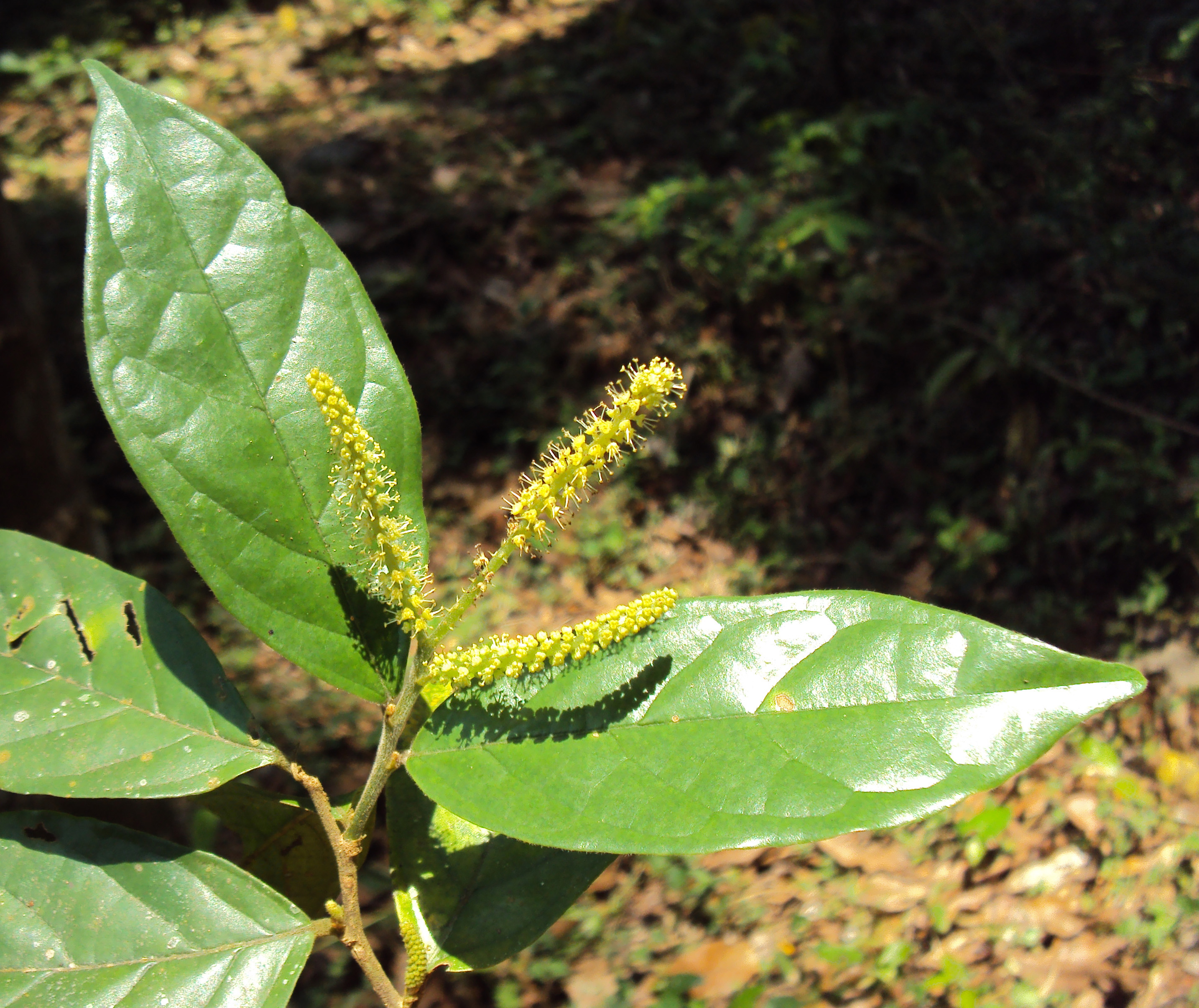

Scientific classification
- Kingdom: Plantae
- Clade: Tracheophytes
- Clade: Angiosperms
- Clade: Eudicots
- Clade: Rosids
- Order: Malpighiales
- Family: Phyllanthaceae
- Genus: Antidesma
- Species: A. montanum

Binomial name
- Antidesma montanum Blume

Varieties
- See text.

Synonyms
- Many

= Antidesma montanum =

Species of flowering plant

Antidesma montanum is a species of tree in the family Phyllanthaceae, native to Southeast Asia, from India to the Philippines. It can grow up to 10 m (33 ft). The fruits are edible. Four varieties have been accepted, each of which has multiple synonyms, which include Antidesma obliquinervium for A. montanum var. montanum.

== Taxonomy ==
Antidesma montanum was first described by Carl Ludwig Blume in 1827.

=== Varieties ===
As of January 2023, Plants of the World Online listed four varieties:

- Antidesma montanum var. microphyllum (Hemsl.) Petra Hoffm.
- Antidesma montanum var. montanum
- Antidesma montanum var. salicinum (Ridl.) Petra Hoffm.
- Antidesma montanum var. wallichii (Tul.) Petra Hoffm.

The varieties each have multiple synonyms. As of February 2023, Antidesma obliquinervium was accepted by Plants of the World Online as a synonym of A. montanum var. montanum. The 1998 IUCN Red List treated A. obliquinervium as "vulnerable", describing it as endemic to Palawan in the Philippines, while A. montanum var. montanum has a wide distribution similar to that of the species as a whole.

== See also ==
- Antidesma bunius
