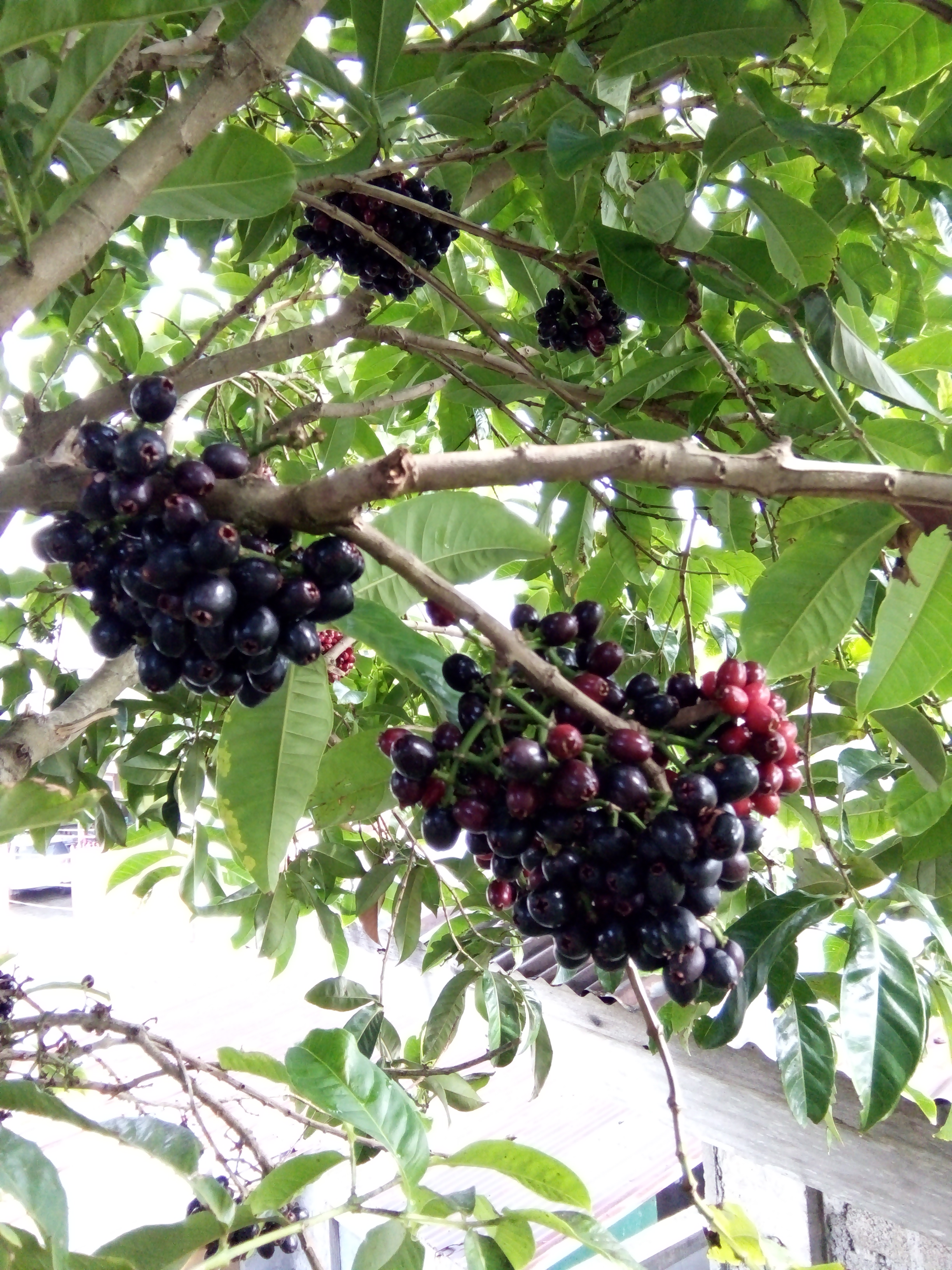
- Ripe lipote berries in Eastern Samar

Conservation status
- Vulnerable (IUCN 3.1)

Scientific classification
- Kingdom: Plantae
- Clade: Tracheophytes
- Clade: Angiosperms
- Clade: Eudicots
- Clade: Rosids
- Order: Myrtales
- Family: Myrtaceae
- Genus: Syzygium
- Species: S. curranii

Binomial name
- Syzygium curranii (C.B.Rob.) Merr.

Synonyms
- Eugenia curranii C.B.Rob.

= Syzygium curranii =

Species of edible berry

Syzygium curranii, commonly known as lipote, is a species of tree endemic to the Philippines. It bears sweet to sour black or red berries that can be eaten fresh (usually with salt or sugar), but are more commonly turned into jams or wine. The tree grows to a height of around 15 m (49 ft). The leaves are oblong in shape and are around 20 to 25 cm (7.9 to 9.8 in) long and 6 to 8 cm (2.4 to 3.1 in) wide. The tree is also harvested for its timber which is used for construction. It is not commercially cultivated and the fruit is harvested from the wild. It is threatened with habitat loss.

Syzygium curranii is also known as lipot, igot, balig-ang, maigang, or malig-ang, lambog in Mindanao, among other common names. These names are shared with Syzygium polycephaloides, a closely related species with similar edible berries.

== See also ==
- Antidesma bunius (bignay)
