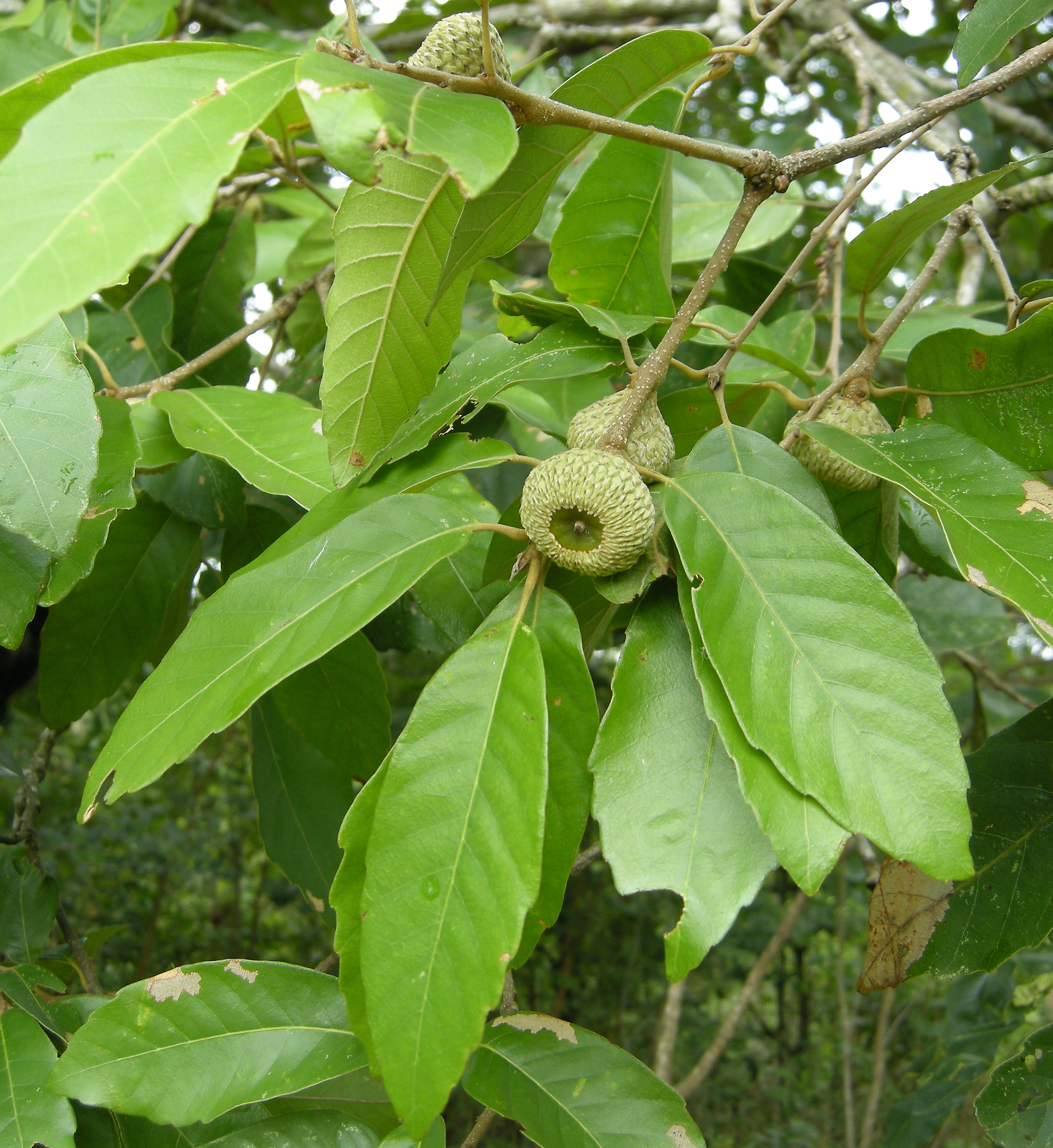

Conservation status
- Endangered (IUCN 3.1)

Scientific classification
- Kingdom: Plantae
- Clade: Embryophytes
- Clade: Tracheophytes
- Clade: Spermatophytes
- Clade: Angiosperms
- Clade: Eudicots
- Clade: Rosids
- Order: Fagales
- Family: Fagaceae
- Genus: Quercus
- Subgenus: Quercus subg. Cerris
- Section: Quercus sect. Cyclobalanopsis
- Species: Q. ramsbottomii

Binomial name
- Quercus ramsbottomii A. Camus (1936)

Synonyms
- Cyclobalanopsis ramsbottomii (A.Camus) Hjelmq.

= Quercus ramsbottomii =

Species of oak tree

Quercus ramsbottomi is a species of oak in the family Fagaceae. It is a tree native to Thailand and Myanmar. The species is endangered.
