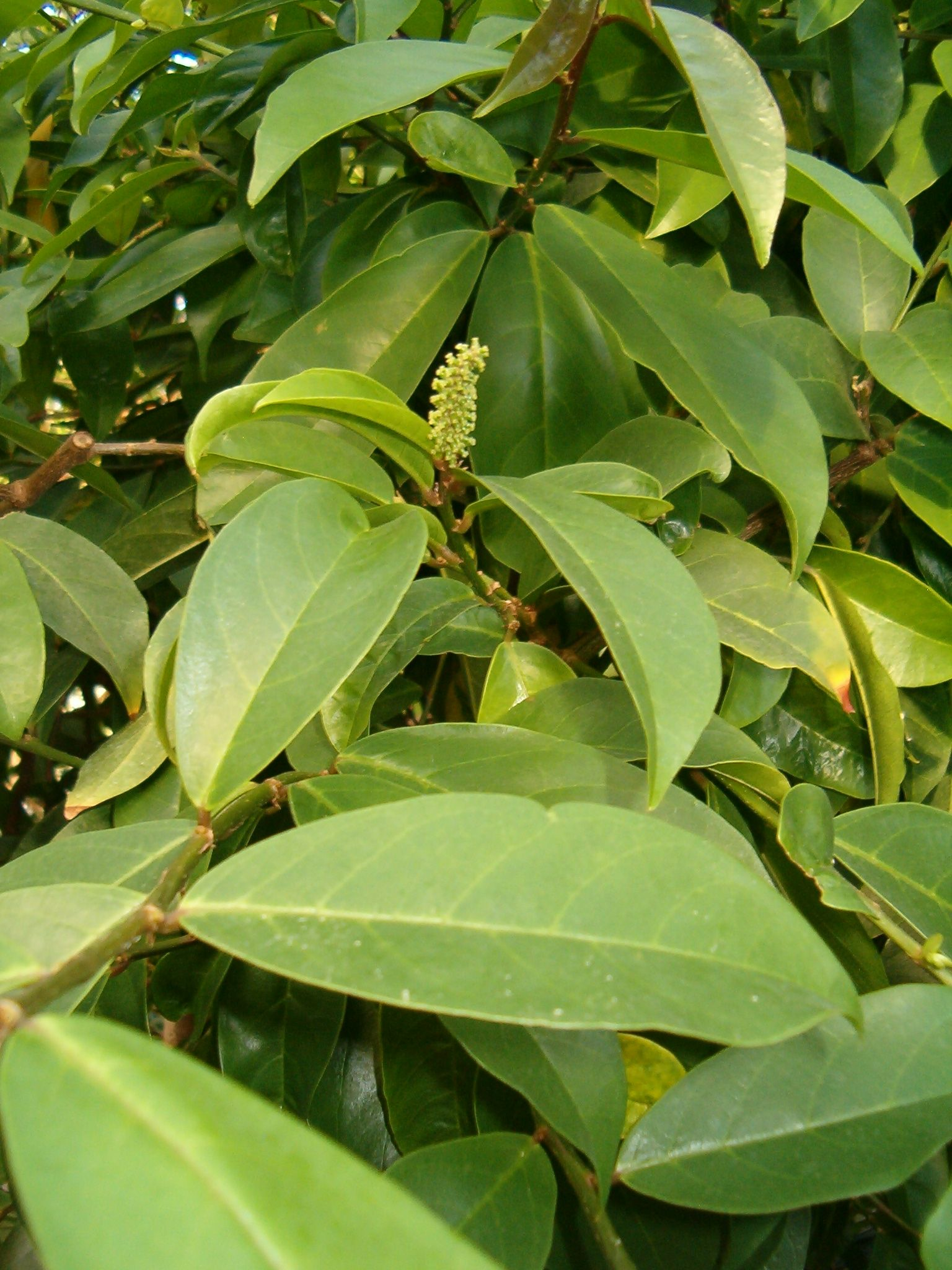
- Leaves and flowers of bignay in the Berlin Botanical Garden and Botanical Museum
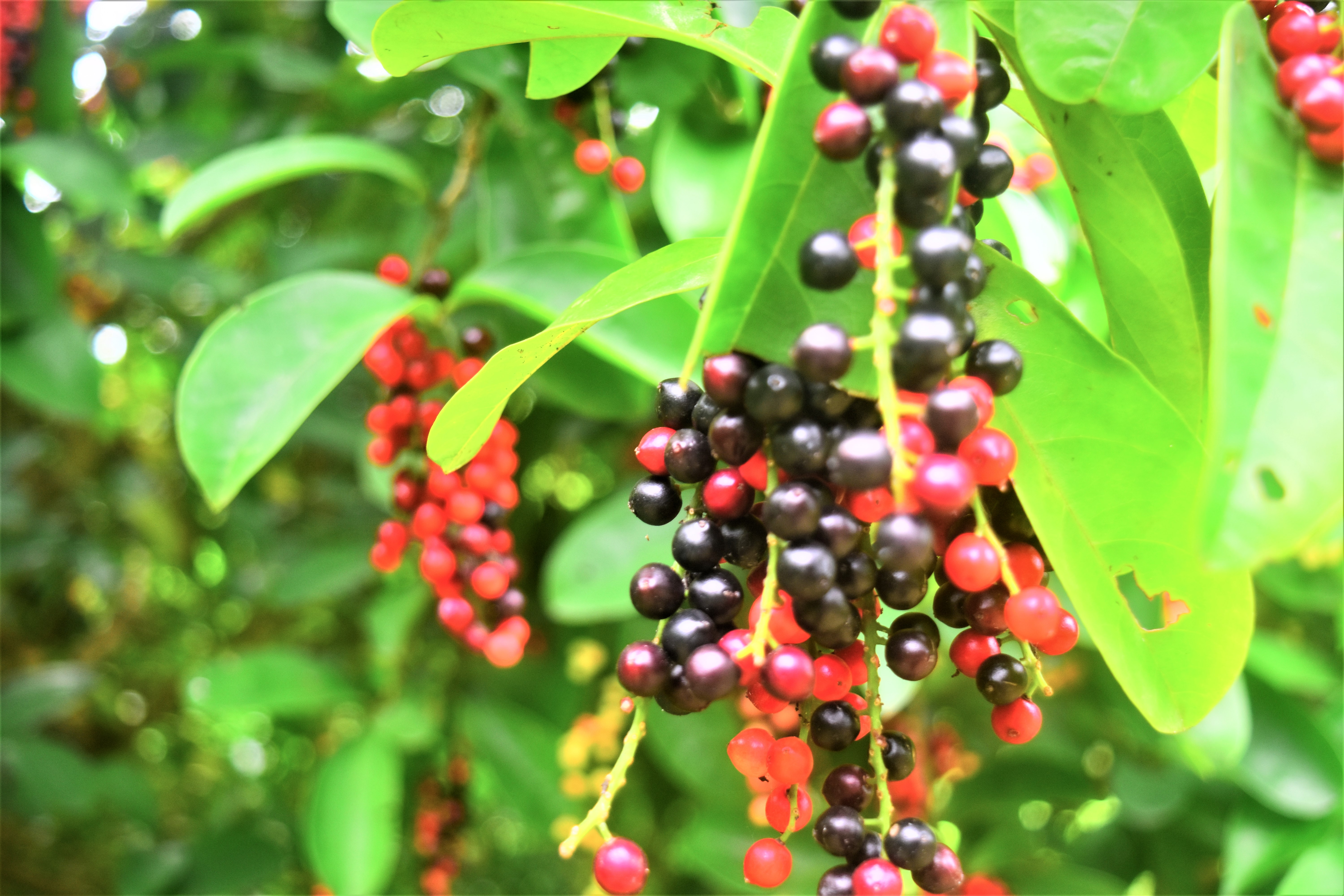
- Ripe bignay fruit in the Philippines

Scientific classification
- Kingdom: Plantae
- Clade: Tracheophytes
- Clade: Angiosperms
- Clade: Eudicots
- Clade: Rosids
- Order: Malpighiales
- Family: Phyllanthaceae
- Genus: Antidesma
- Species: A. bunius

Binomial name
- Antidesma bunius (L.) Spreng.

= Antidesma bunius =

Species of tree

Antidesma bunius is a species of fruit tree in the family Phyllanthaceae. It is native to South Asia, Southeast Asia, Melanesia, and northern Australia. It is commonly known as bignay, after its native name in the Philippines, where the fruits are commonly used for making bignay wine and jams. It is also known more ambiguously as Chinese laurel, Queensland cherry, salamander tree, wild cherry, and currant tree.

== Description ==
It is a variable plant which may be short and shrubby or tall and erect, approaching 30 metres (98 feet) in height. It has large oval-shaped leathery evergreen leaves up to about 20 centimetres (8 inches) long and 7 cm (3 in) wide. They are attached to the twigs of the tree with short petioles, creating a dense canopy.

The species is dioecious, with male and female flowers growing on separate trees. The flowers have a strong, somewhat unpleasant scent. The staminate flowers are arranged in small bunches and the pistillate flowers grow on long racemes which will become the long strands of fruit. The fruits are spherical and just under 1 cm (1/2 in) wide, hanging singly or paired in long, heavy bunches. They are white when immature and gradually turn red, then black.

Each bunch of fruits ripens unevenly, so the fruits in a bunch are all different colors. The skin of the fruit has red juice, while the white pulp has colorless juice. The fruit contains a light-colored seed. The fruit has a sour taste similar to that of the cranberry when immature, and a tart but sweet taste when ripe.

There is an inverse correlation between the ability to taste phenylthiocarbamide and bitterness in A. bunius.

== Distribution and habitat ==
The native range of wild trees of Antidesma bunius extends from parts of South Asia (Sri Lanka and the lower Himalayan regions of India, as well as the Andaman and Nicobar Islands), to Southeast Asia (the Philippines, parts of Indonesia, and Mainland Southeast Asia), Papua New Guinea, the Solomon Islands, and northern Australia. It is absent in Peninsular Malaysia and rare in Borneo. It is cultivated in South Asia, southern China, Southeast Asia, Polynesia, Cuba, Honduras, and Florida. It grows in rainforests and semi-evergreen tropical forests.

== Uses ==
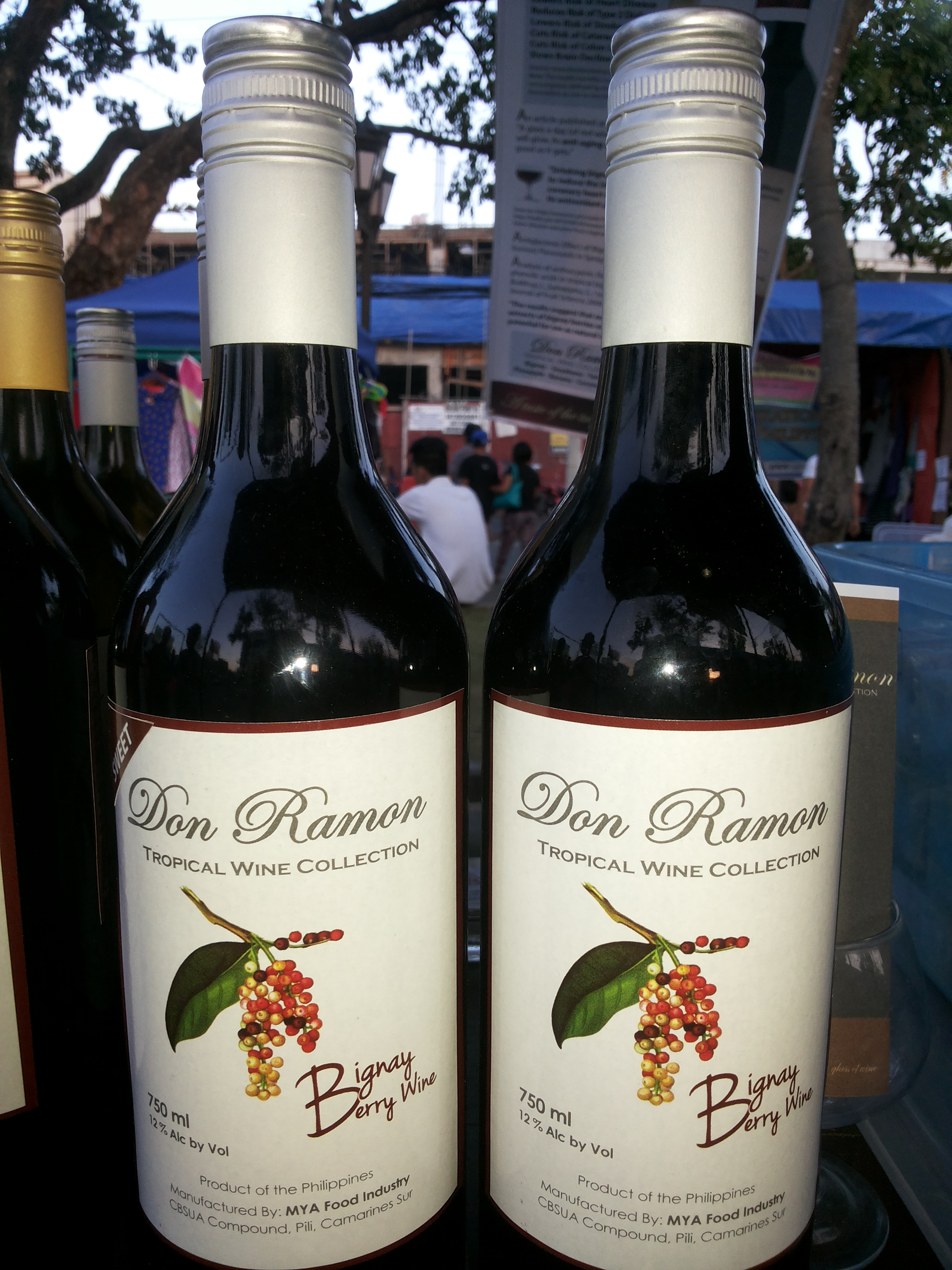
Bignay wine from the Philippines

The fruits are edible raw. Bunches of ripe fruits are commonly sold in Indonesia from trees grown in rural villages. In the Philippines, its fruits are made into bignay wine, jams (alone or in combination with other fruits), desserts, and drinks. Unripe sour fruits are also sometimes used as a substitute for tomatoes or vinegar in some dishes in Filipino cuisine. The tender young leaves are sometimes eaten with rice in Indonesia and the Philippines, and the leaf shoots are used to make tea in China.

== See also ==
- Antidesma montanum
- Syzygium curranii (lipote)
- Syzygium polycephaloides (lipote)
