= Bignay wine =

Filipino fruit wine

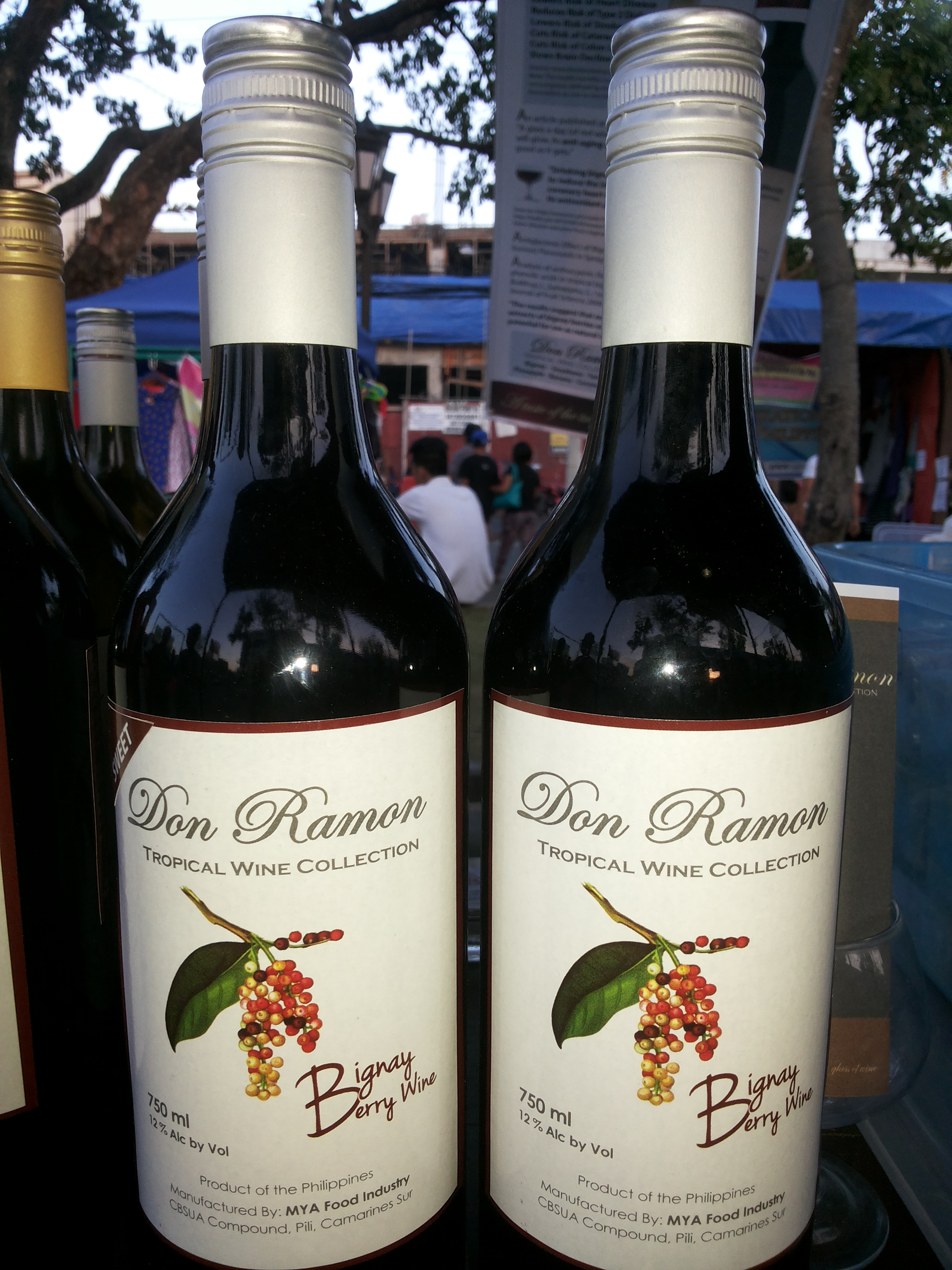
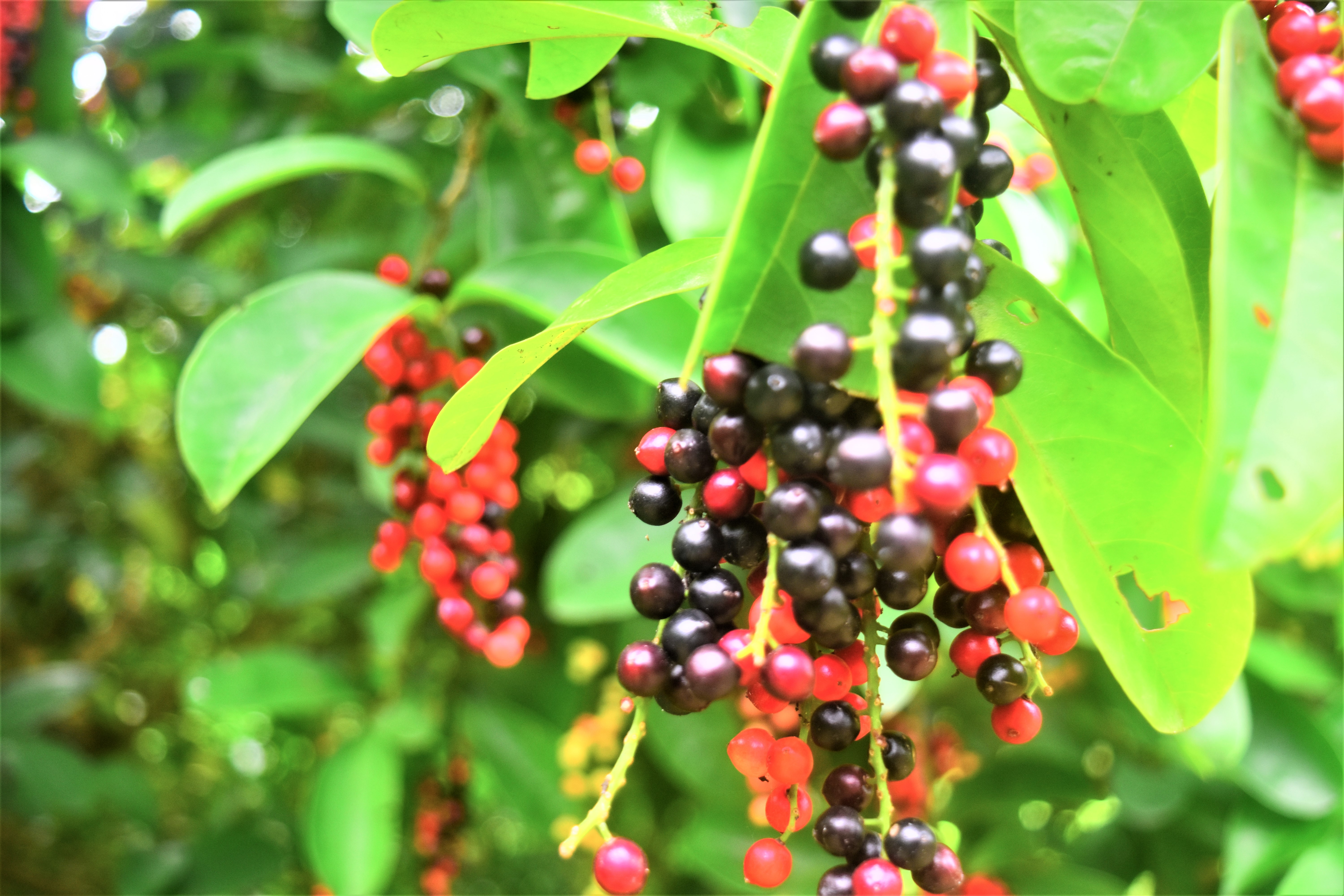
- Top: Bottled bignay wine; Bottom: Ripe bignay fruits from the Philippines
- Type: Fruit wine
- Origin: Philippines
- Alcohol by volume: 12-13%
- Ingredients: Bignay

Bignay wine, also known as bugnay wine, is a Filipino fruit wine made from the berries of the native bignay or bugnay tree (Antidesma bunius). It is deep red in color and is slightly sweet with a fruity fragrance.
