= Syzygium polycephaloides =

Conservation status
- Near Threatened (IUCN 3.1)

Scientific classification
- Kingdom: Plantae
- Clade: Tracheophytes
- Clade: Angiosperms
- Clade: Eudicots
- Clade: Rosids
- Order: Myrtales
- Family: Myrtaceae
- Genus: Syzygium
- Species: S. polycephaloides

Binomial name
- Syzygium polycephaloides (C.B.Rob.) Merr.

Synonyms
- Eugenia polycephaloides C.B.Rob.

Species of edible berry

Syzygium polycephaloides, commonly known as lipote, is a species of tree native to the Philippines, southeastern Sulawesi, and the Lesser Sunda Islands. It bears edible red to purple berries that can be eaten fresh but are usually turned into jams or wine in the Philippines. The tree grows to a height of around 15 m (49 ft). The leaves are oblong in shape and are around 50 cm (20 in) long and 15 cm (5.9 in) wide. It bears fruit between May and June.

In the Philippines, Syzygium polycephaloides is also known as lipot, igot, balig-ang, maigang, or malig-ang, among other common names. These names are shared with Syzygium curranii, a closely related species endemic to the Philippines with similar edible berries.

== See also ==
- Antidesma bunius (bignay)
