= Coerulescine =

Names
- Preferred IUPAC name (3R)-1'-methylspiro[1H-indole-3,3'-pyrrolidine]-2-one

Identifiers
3D model (JSmol)	Interactive image
ChemSpider	9107766
PubChem CID	12297097
- InChI: InChI=1S/C12H14N2O/c1-14-7-6-12(8-14)9-4-2-3-5-10(9)13-11(12)15/h2-5H,6-8H2,1H3,(H,13,15) Key: PNYGHERLKSFRMH-UHFFFAOYSA-N
- SMILES: O=C2Nc1c(cccc1)C23CN(CC3)C

Properties
Chemical formula	C_{12}H_{14}N_{2}O
Molar mass	202.257 g·mol^{−1}
- Except where otherwise noted, data are given for materials in their standard state (at 25 °C [77 °F], 100 kPa). verify (what is ?) Infobox references

Coerulescine is an oxindole alkaloid found in the plant Phalaris coerulescens.

It is a member of the spiroindolone class. Elacomine and horsfiline have similar chemical structures.
