= H. grandis =

H. grandis may refer to:

- Hadrobunus grandis, a harvestman species found in the United States
- Haptodus grandis, a small sphenacodont species that lived from Latest Carboniferous to Early Permian in the equatorial Pangea
- Hazelia grandis, a spicular demosponge species that lived during the Cambrian
- Heosemys grandis, the giant Asian pond turtle, a turtle species found in Cambodia and Vietnam and in parts of Laos, Malaysia, Myanmar and Thailand
- Hierodula grandis, the giant Asian mantis, a praying mantis species found in Bangladesh, Northeast India, and Myanmar
- Hogna grandis, a wolf spider species in the genus Hogna
- Horsfieldia grandis, a plant species found in Indonesia, Malaysia and Singapore
- Hylomyscus grandis, the Mount Oku hylomyscus, a rodent species found only in Cameroon
- Hypolepis grandis, a fern species in the genus Hypolepis

== Synonyms ==
- Hoodia grandis, a synonym for Hoodia pilifera, a succulent plant species in the genus Hoodia

== See also ==
- Grandis (disambiguation)
