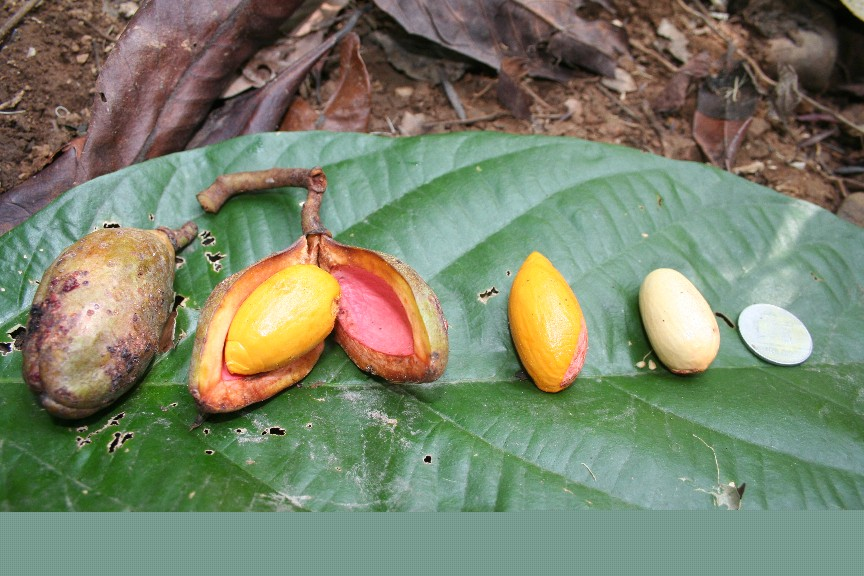
- Horsfieldia kingii fruits
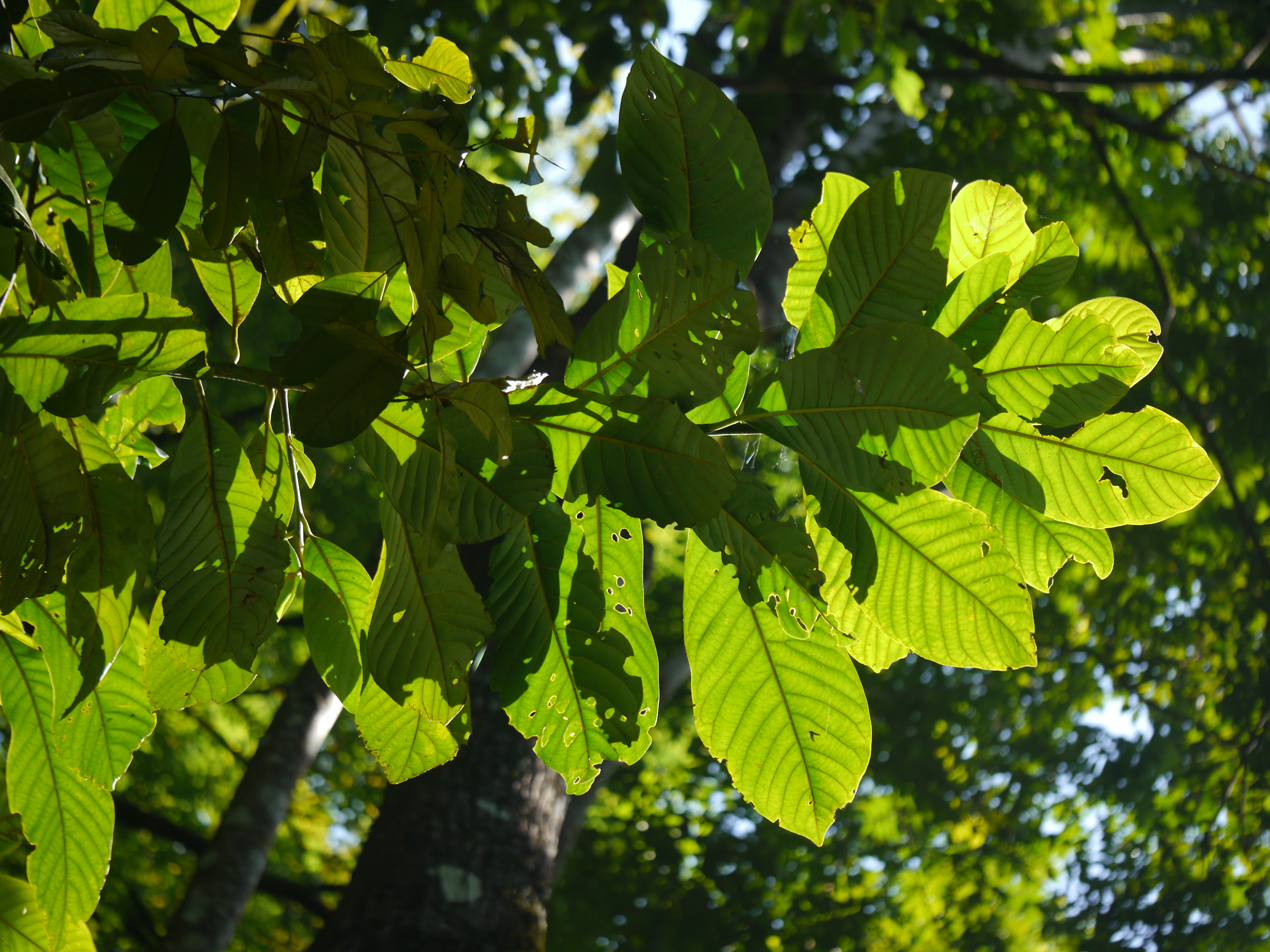
- Horsfieldia kingii leaves

Conservation status
- Least Concern (IUCN 3.1)

Scientific classification
- Kingdom: Plantae
- Clade: Embryophytes
- Clade: Tracheophytes
- Clade: Spermatophytes
- Clade: Angiosperms
- Clade: Magnoliids
- Order: Magnoliales
- Family: Myristicaceae
- Genus: Horsfieldia
- Species: H. kingii

Binomial name
- Horsfieldia kingii (Hook.f.) Warb.

Synonyms
- Horsfieldia hainanensis Merr.; Horsfieldia tetratepala C.Y.Wu & W.T.Wang; Myristica kingii Hook.f]] (1886); Palala kingii (Hook.f.) Kuntze

= Horsfieldia kingii =

Species of tree

Horsfieldia kingii is a dioecious tree of the family Myristicaceae. It grows up to 20 m tall It is native to mainland Asia, ranging from eastern Nepal through northeastern India, Bangladesh, Myanmar, and Thailand to southern China.

It has large seeds that are dispersed by frugivores such as hornbills and imperial pigeons. The fruiting period is from February to May. The fruit is an arillate capsule and is bi-coloured.

The plant is referred to as ramtamul in Assamese language and is sometimes used as a substitute for betelnut. However, they could be mildly intoxicating to humans. The leaves form a part of the diet of the endangered capped langur.

The species was first described as Myristica kingii by Joseph Dalton Hooker in 1886. In 1897 Otto Warburg placed the species in genus Horsfieldia as H. kingii.
