= Horsfieldia motleyi =

Conservation status
- Vulnerable (IUCN 2.3)

Scientific classification
- Kingdom: Plantae
- Clade: Embryophytes
- Clade: Tracheophytes
- Clade: Spermatophytes
- Clade: Angiosperms
- Clade: Magnoliids
- Order: Magnoliales
- Family: Myristicaceae
- Genus: Horsfieldia
- Species: H. motleyi

Binomial name
- Horsfieldia motleyi Warb.

Synonyms
- Myristica motleyi (Warb.) Boerl.; Horsfieldia macrobotrys Merr.

Species of tree

Horsfieldia motleyi is a species of plant in the family Myristicaceae. It is a tree endemic to Borneo.
