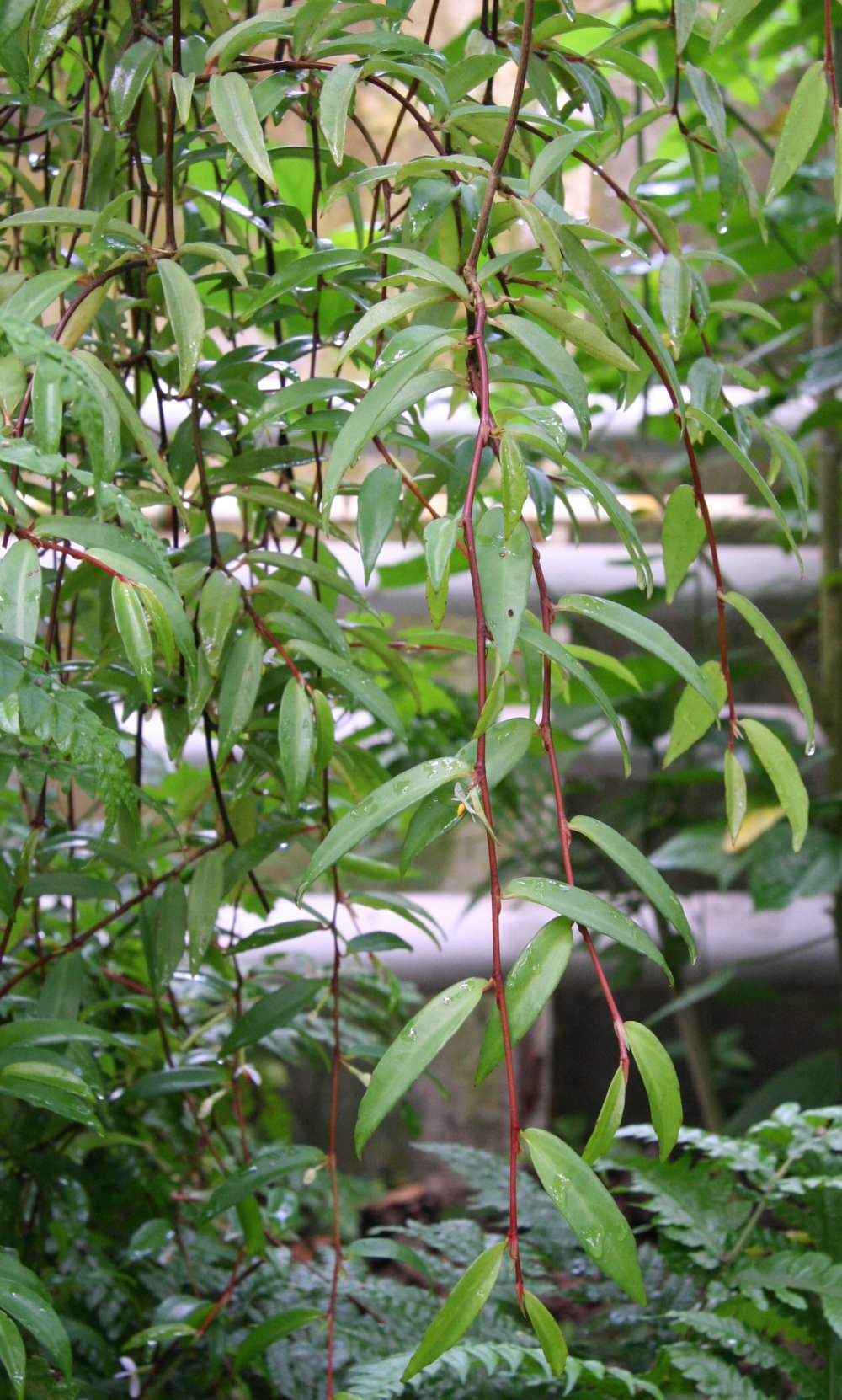

Conservation status
- Vulnerable (IUCN 3.1)

Scientific classification
- Kingdom: Plantae
- Clade: Tracheophytes
- Clade: Angiosperms
- Clade: Eudicots
- Clade: Rosids
- Order: Cucurbitales
- Family: Begoniaceae
- Genus: Begonia
- Species: B. oxyanthera

Binomial name
- Begonia oxyanthera Warb.

= Begonia oxyanthera =

Species of flowering plant

Begonia oxyanthera is a species of plant in the family Begoniaceae. It is found in Cameroon, Equatorial Guinea, and possibly Nigeria. Its natural habitats are subtropical or tropical moist lowland forests and subtropical or tropical moist montane forests. It is threatened by habitat loss.
