= Horsfieldia crassifolia =

Conservation status
- Least Concern (IUCN 3.1)

Scientific classification
- Kingdom: Plantae
- Clade: Embryophytes
- Clade: Tracheophytes
- Clade: Spermatophytes
- Clade: Angiosperms
- Clade: Magnoliids
- Order: Magnoliales
- Family: Myristicaceae
- Genus: Horsfieldia
- Species: H. crassifolia

Binomial name
- Horsfieldia crassifolia (Hook.f. & Thomson) Warb.

Synonyms
- Horsfieldia fulva var. paludicola (King) Warb.; Myristica crassifolia Hook.f. & Thomson (1855); Myristica paludicola King

Species of tree

Horsfieldia crassifolia is a species of flowering plant in the family Myristicaceae. It is a tree native to Peninsular Thailand, Peninsular Malaysia, Singapore, Sumatra, and Borneo.

The species was first described as Myristica crassifolia by Joseph Dalton Hooker and Thomas Thomson in 1855. In 1897 Otto Warburg placed the species in genus Horsfieldia as H. crassifolia.
