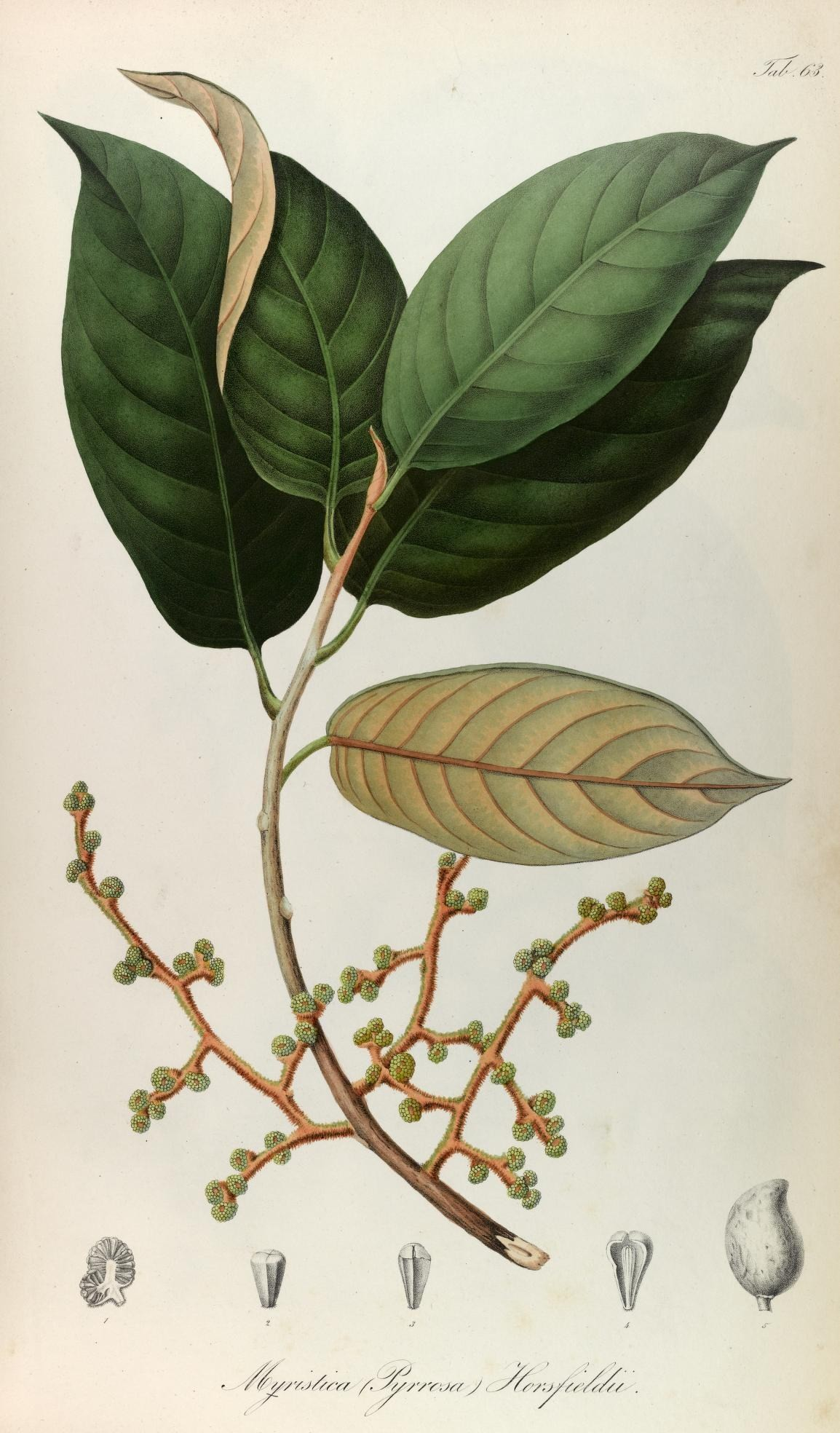
- Horsfieldia wallichii (as synonym Myristica horsfieldii)

Conservation status
- Least Concern (IUCN 3.1)

Scientific classification
- Kingdom: Plantae
- Clade: Embryophytes
- Clade: Tracheophytes
- Clade: Spermatophytes
- Clade: Angiosperms
- Clade: Magnoliids
- Order: Magnoliales
- Family: Myristicaceae
- Genus: Horsfieldia
- Species: H. wallichii

Binomial name
- Horsfieldia wallichii (Hook.f. & Thomson) Warb.

Synonyms
- Myristica horsfieldii Wall., not validly publ.; Myristica wallichii Hook.f. & Thomson (1855); Palala wallichii (Hook.f. & Thomson) Kuntze

= Horsfieldia wallichii =

Species of flowering plant

Horsfieldia wallichii is a species of flowering plant in the family Myristicaceae. It is a tree native to Peninsular Thailand, Peninsular Malaysia, Singapore, Borneo, and Sumatra.
