= Horsfieldia ardisiifolia =

Conservation status
- Near Threatened (IUCN 3.1)

Scientific classification
- Kingdom: Plantae
- Clade: Embryophytes
- Clade: Tracheophytes
- Clade: Spermatophytes
- Clade: Angiosperms
- Clade: Magnoliids
- Order: Magnoliales
- Family: Myristicaceae
- Genus: Horsfieldia
- Species: H. ardisiifolia

Binomial name
- Horsfieldia ardisiifolia (A.DC.) Warb.

Synonyms
- Horsfieldia gigantifolia Elmer; Horsfieldia warburgiana Elmer; Myristica ardisiifolia A.DC. (1855); Palala ardisiifolia Kuntze

Species of flowering plant

Horsfieldia ardisiifolia is a species of flowering plant in the family Myristicaceae. It is a tree endemic to the Philippines.
