= Horsfieldia tomentosa =

Conservation status
- Least Concern (IUCN 3.1)

Scientific classification
- Kingdom: Plantae
- Clade: Embryophytes
- Clade: Tracheophytes
- Clade: Spermatophytes
- Clade: Angiosperms
- Clade: Magnoliids
- Order: Magnoliales
- Family: Myristicaceae
- Genus: Horsfieldia
- Species: H. tomentosa

Binomial name
- Horsfieldia tomentosa Warb.

Synonyms
- Myristica tomentosa Hook.f. & Thomson, nom. illeg. homonym. post.

Species of tree

Horsfieldia tomentosa is a species of flowering plant in the family Myristicaceae. It is a tree native to eastern Sumatra, Peninsular Malaysia, and Peninsular Thailand.
