= Horsfieldia valida =

Conservation status
- Endangered (IUCN 3.1)

Scientific classification
- Kingdom: Plantae
- Clade: Embryophytes
- Clade: Tracheophytes
- Clade: Spermatophytes
- Clade: Angiosperms
- Clade: Magnoliids
- Order: Magnoliales
- Family: Myristicaceae
- Genus: Horsfieldia
- Species: H. valida

Binomial name
- Horsfieldia valida (Miq.) Warb.

Synonyms
- Myristica valida Miq.; Palala valida (Miq.) Kuntze

Species of tree

Horsfieldia valida is a species of flowering plant in the family Myristicaceae. It is a tree native to Sumatra and western Borneo.

The species was first described as Myristica valida by Friedrich Anton Wilhelm Miquel in 1858. In 1897 Otto Warburg placed the species in genus Horsfieldia in 1897.
