= Horsfieldia sylvestris =

Conservation status
- Least Concern (IUCN 3.1)

Scientific classification
- Kingdom: Plantae
- Clade: Embryophytes
- Clade: Tracheophytes
- Clade: Spermatophytes
- Clade: Angiosperms
- Clade: Magnoliids
- Order: Magnoliales
- Family: Myristicaceae
- Genus: Horsfieldia
- Species: H. sylvestris

Binomial name
- Horsfieldia sylvestris (Houtt.) Warb.

Synonyms
- Horsfieldia sylvestris var. villosa Warb.; Myristica pendulina Hook.f.; Myristica pinniformis Zipp. ex Miq.; Myristica salicifolia Willd.; Myristica sylvestris Houtt.; Palala pendulina (Hook.f.) Kuntze; Palala pinniformis (Zipp. ex Miq.) Kuntze; Palala sylvestris (Houtt.) Kuntze

Species of tree

Horsfieldia sylvestris is a species of flowering plant in the family Myristicaceae. It is a tree native to the Maluku Islands and New Guinea.

The species was first described as Myristica sylvestris by Martinus Houttuyn in 1774. In 1897 Otto Warburg placed the species in genus Horsfieldia as H. sylvestris.
