= Hoya amboinensis =

Scientific classification
- Kingdom: Plantae
- Clade: Embryophytes
- Clade: Tracheophytes
- Clade: Spermatophytes
- Clade: Angiosperms
- Clade: Eudicots
- Clade: Asterids
- Order: Gentianales
- Family: Apocynaceae
- Genus: Hoya
- Species: H. amboinensis

Binomial name
- Hoya amboinensis Warb.

Species of flowering plant

Hoya amboinensis is a species of flowering plant in the family Apocynaceae, native to the Maluku Islands. It was first described by Otto Warburg, and no subspecies are known.

== Description ==
Hoya amboinensis is a twining plant with a smooth, glossy stems approximately 2 to 3 mm (0.08 to 0.12 in) thick. The leaves are oblong to broadly ovate, with a rounded base and an acute apex, measuring around 6 to 7 cm (2 to 3 in) long and 2.5 to 5 cm (1 to 2 in) wide. The upper surface has a glandular structures near the base of the midrib. It has a few leaves and arches towards the margin.

== Distribution ==
Hoya amboinensis is native to the Maluku Islands, where it occurs primarily in the tropical wet forests.

== See also ==
- List of Hoya species
