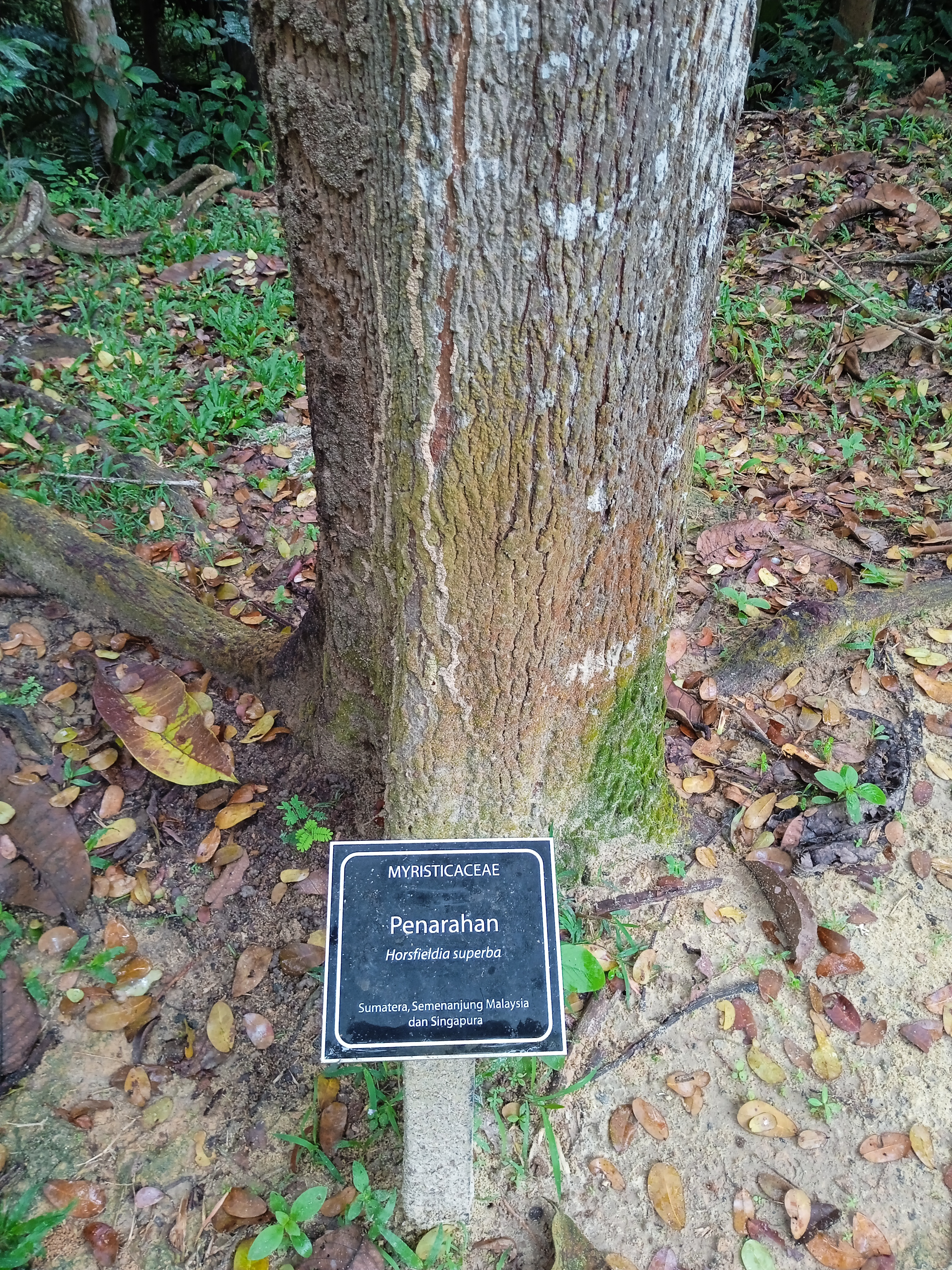

Conservation status
- Least Concern (IUCN 3.1)

Scientific classification
- Kingdom: Plantae
- Clade: Embryophytes
- Clade: Tracheophytes
- Clade: Spermatophytes
- Clade: Angiosperms
- Clade: Magnoliids
- Order: Magnoliales
- Family: Myristicaceae
- Genus: Horsfieldia
- Species: H. superba

Binomial name
- Horsfieldia superba (Hook.f. & Thomson) Warb.

Synonyms
- Myristica superba Hook.f. & Thomson; Palala superba (Hook.f. & Thomson) Kuntze

= Horsfieldia superba =

Species of tree

Horsfieldia superba is a species of flowering plant in the family Myristicaceae. It is a tree found in Sumatra, Peninsular Malaysia, and Singapore, and is threatened by habitat loss. It is used in traditional herbal medicine and contains an alkaloid called horsfiline, which has analgesic effects, as well as several other compounds including 5-MeO-DMT and 6-methoxy-2-methyl-1,2,3,4-tetrahydro-β-carboline.

The species was first described as Myristica superba by Joseph Dalton Hooker and Thomas Thomson in 1855. In 1897 Otto Warburg placed the species in genus Horsfieldia as H. superba.
