= C15H20N2O2 =

The molecular formula C_{15}H_{20}N_{2}O_{2} (molar mass: 260.337 g/mol) may refer to:

- 1-Acetyl-5-MeO-DMT
- 4-AcO-MET, or metacetin
- Elacomine
- Fenspiride
- 5,6-MDO-MiPT
- Sazetidine A (AMOP-H-OH)
