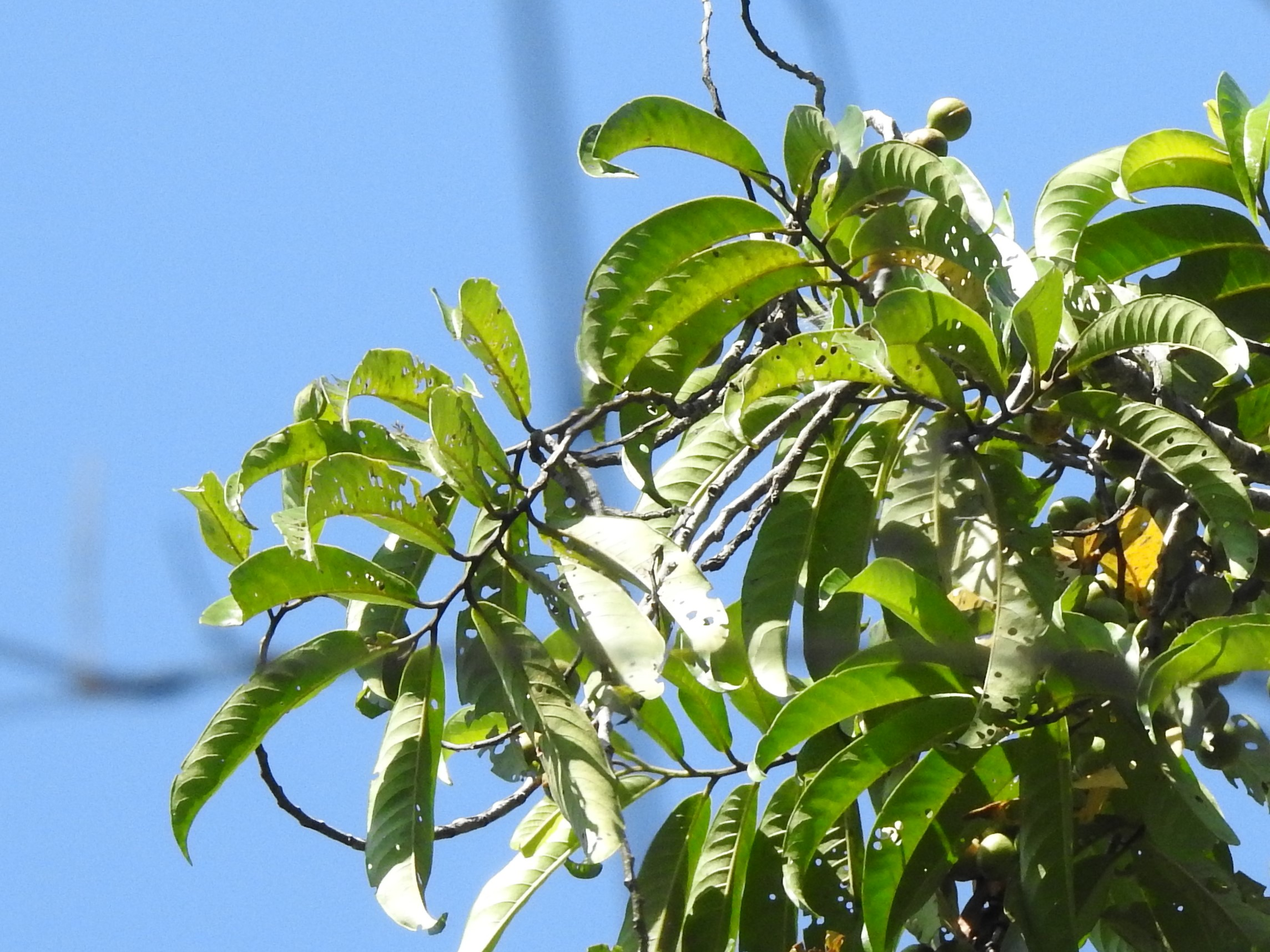

Conservation status
- Least Concern (IUCN 3.1)

Scientific classification
- Kingdom: Plantae
- Clade: Tracheophytes
- Clade: Angiosperms
- Clade: Magnoliids
- Order: Magnoliales
- Family: Myristicaceae
- Genus: Horsfieldia
- Species: H. irya

Binomial name
- Horsfieldia irya (Gaertn.) Warb.

Synonyms
- Horsfieldia lemanniana (A.DC.) Warb.; Myristica irya Gaertn.

= Horsfieldia irya =

Species of plant

Horsfieldia irya is a species of plant in the family Myristicaceae. It is found in Burma, India, Malaysia, Papua New Guinea, Singapore, Solomon Islands, Sri Lanka, Thailand, and Vietnam.

The plant is a dioecious tree that grows to about 8–10 m high. Its leaves are thick, elliptical and up to 25 cm long, while its panicles are short and have rust hairs. The plant's young leaves are consumed as vegetables, or used an ingredients such as for cooking. In Vietnam it is used in a Bánh tráng Trảng Bàng rice paper dish.
