= Horsfieldia fulva =

Conservation status
- Vulnerable (IUCN 2.3)

Scientific classification
- Kingdom: Plantae
- Clade: Embryophytes
- Clade: Tracheophytes
- Clade: Spermatophytes
- Clade: Angiosperms
- Clade: Magnoliids
- Order: Magnoliales
- Family: Myristicaceae
- Genus: Horsfieldia
- Species: H. fulva

Binomial name
- Horsfieldia fulva (King) Warb.

Synonyms
- Myristica fulva King

Species of tree

Horsfieldia fulva is a species of flowering plant in the family Myristicaceae. It is a tree found in Sumatra and Peninsular Malaysia. It is threatened by habitat loss.
