= Horsfieldia carnosa =

Conservation status
- Near Threatened (IUCN 2.3)

Scientific classification
- Kingdom: Plantae
- Clade: Tracheophytes
- Clade: Angiosperms
- Clade: Magnoliids
- Order: Magnoliales
- Family: Myristicaceae
- Genus: Horsfieldia
- Species: H. carnosa

Binomial name
- Horsfieldia carnosa Warb.

Species of tree

Horsfieldia carnosa is a plant species in the family Myristicaceae. It is a tree endemic to Borneo.
