= Horsfieldia amplomontana =

Conservation status
- Vulnerable (IUCN 3.1)

Scientific classification
- Kingdom: Plantae
- Clade: Embryophytes
- Clade: Tracheophytes
- Clade: Spermatophytes
- Clade: Angiosperms
- Clade: Magnoliids
- Order: Magnoliales
- Family: Myristicaceae
- Genus: Horsfieldia
- Species: H. amplomontana

Binomial name
- Horsfieldia amplomontana W.J.de Wilde

Species of tree

Horsfieldia amplomontana is a species tree in the family Myristicaceae. It is endemic to Mount Kinabalu in Sabah, Malaysia. Its habitat is old-growth and second-growth hill and montane forests on the western and southwestern slopes of Mount Kinabalu.
