= Horsfieldia sessilifolia =

Conservation status
- Critically Endangered (IUCN 2.3)

Scientific classification
- Kingdom: Plantae
- Clade: Tracheophytes
- Clade: Angiosperms
- Clade: Magnoliids
- Order: Magnoliales
- Family: Myristicaceae
- Genus: Horsfieldia
- Species: H. sessilifolia

Binomial name
- Horsfieldia sessilifolia W.J.de Wilde

Species of tree

Horsfieldia sessilifolia is a species of plant in the family Myristicaceae. It is a tree endemic to Borneo, and has only been collected once for scientific purposes (1971) from Sarawak, a region known for agroforestry and cultivation of Sarawak black pepper. The habitat of H. sessilifolia is lowland areas of swampy forest.
