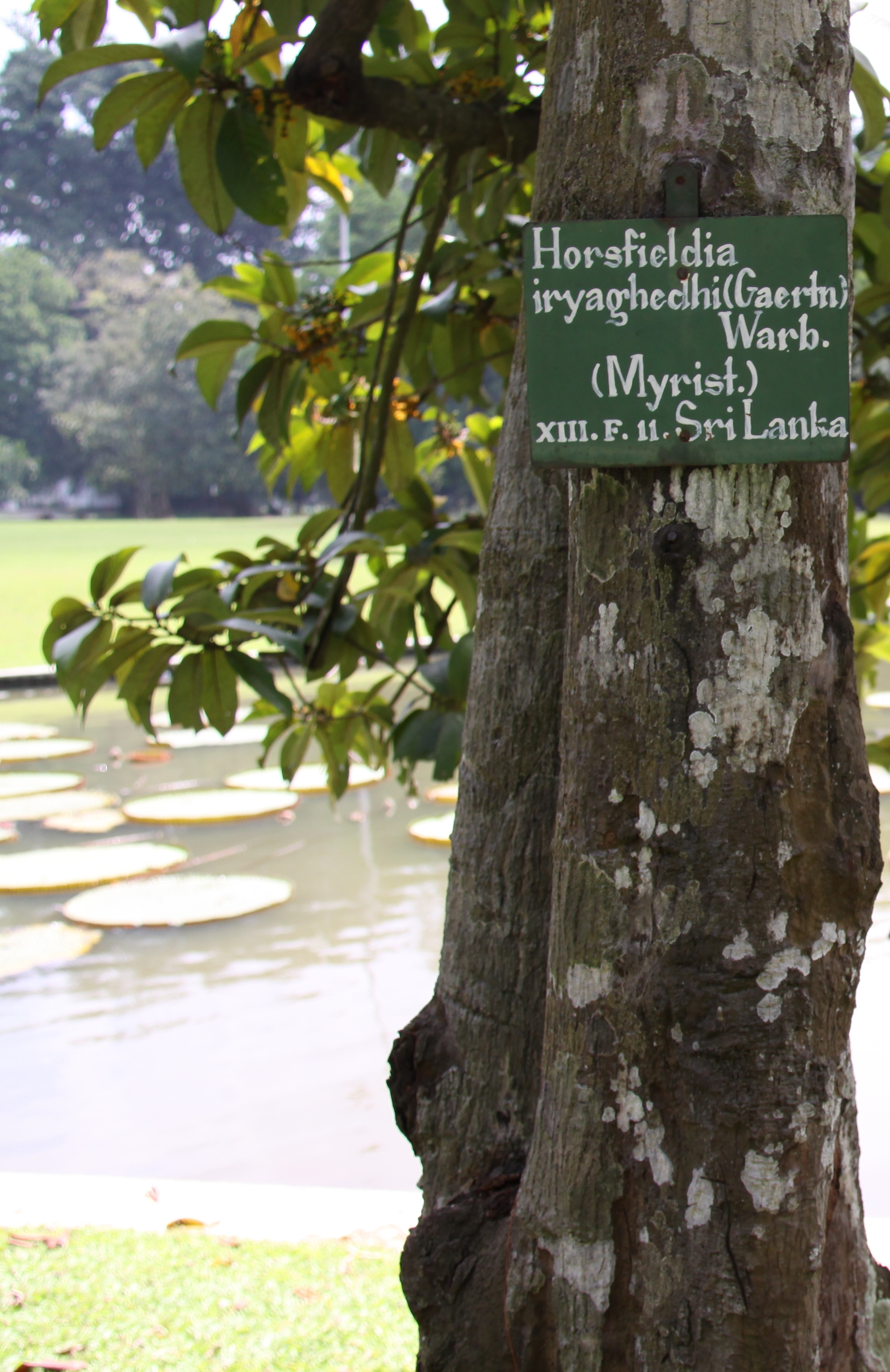

Conservation status
- Critically Endangered (IUCN 2.3)

Scientific classification
- Kingdom: Plantae
- Clade: Tracheophytes
- Clade: Angiosperms
- Clade: Magnoliids
- Order: Magnoliales
- Family: Myristicaceae
- Genus: Horsfieldia
- Species: H. iryaghedhi

Binomial name
- Horsfieldia iryaghedhi (Gaertn.) Warb.

Synonyms
- Horsfieldia odorata Willd. (type for Horsfieldia)

= Horsfieldia iryaghedhi =

Species of flowering plant

Horsfieldia iryaghedhi is a species of plant in the family Myristicaceae. It is endemic to Sri Lanka.

== Culture ==
Known as "ruk - රුක්" in Sinhala.

In Theravada Buddhism, this plant is said to have used as the tree for achieved enlightenment, or Bodhi by sixteenth buddha called "Piyadassi - පියදස්සි". The plant is known as කුකුධ (Kukudha) in Sanskrit.
