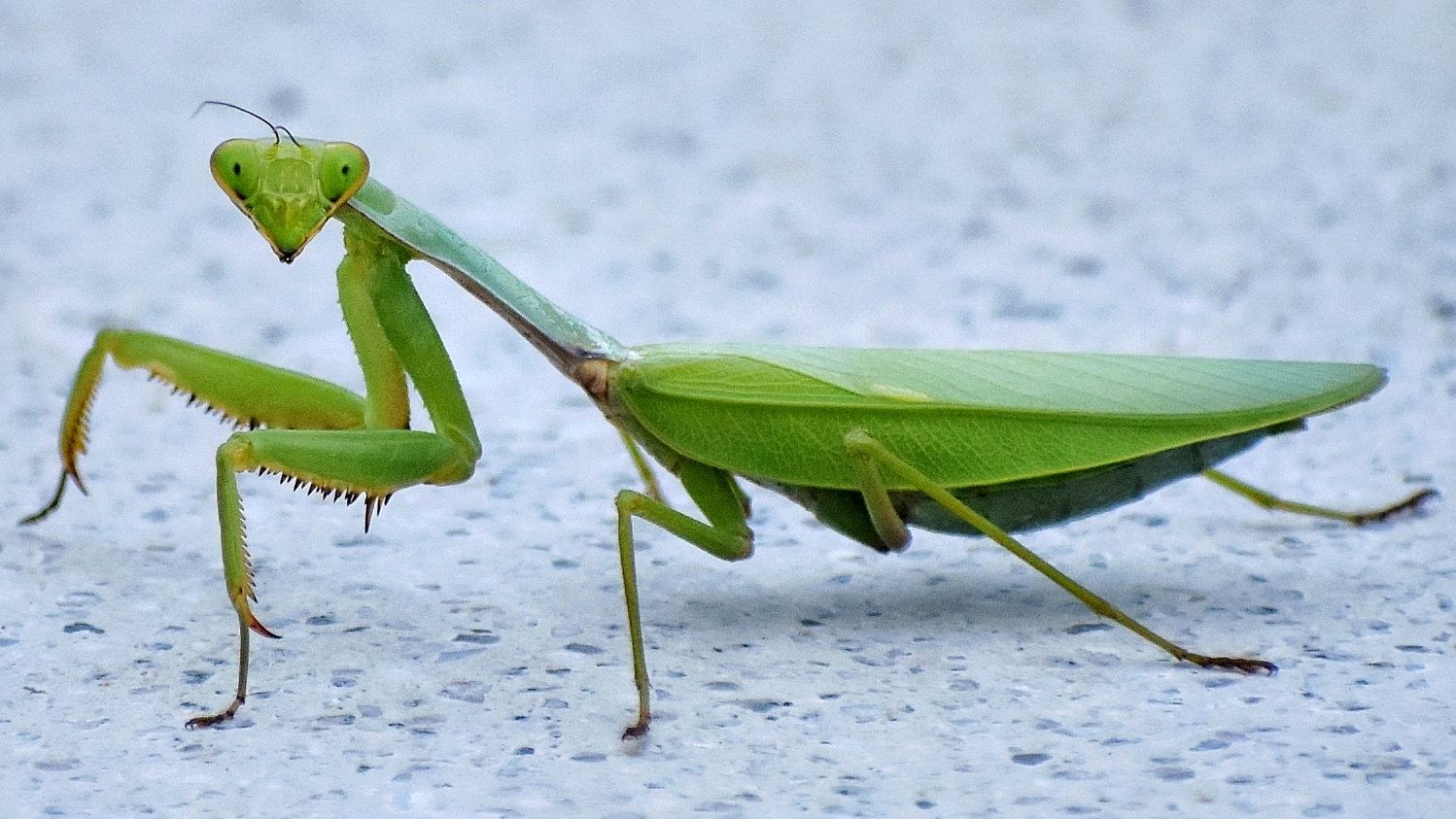
- Titanodula formosana

Scientific classification
- Domain: Eukaryota
- Kingdom: Animalia
- Phylum: Arthropoda
- Class: Insecta
- Order: Mantodea
- Family: Mantidae
- Tribe: Hierodulini
- Genus: Titanodula; Vermeersch, 2020

Species
- see text.

= Titanodula =

Genus of praying mantises

Titanodula is a genus of mantids in the subfamily Hierodulinae. There are currently five species placed in Titanodula. The genus is endemic to Asia and is distinguished from the similar genus Hierodula by the large size and unique male genitalia of its member species.

== Species ==
- Titanodula attenboroughi Vermeersch, 2020
- Titanodula formosana (Giglio-Tos, 1912)
- Titanodula fruhstorferi (Werner, 1916)
- Titanodula grandis (Saussure, 1870)
- Titanodula menglaensis Liu, 2021
