= Horsfieldia sparsa =

Conservation status
- Near Threatened (IUCN 2.3)

Scientific classification
- Kingdom: Plantae
- Clade: Tracheophytes
- Clade: Angiosperms
- Clade: Magnoliids
- Order: Magnoliales
- Family: Myristicaceae
- Genus: Horsfieldia
- Species: H. sparsa

Binomial name
- Horsfieldia sparsa W.J.de Wilde

Species of tree

Horsfieldia sparsa is a species of plant in the family Myristicaceae. It is a tree that grows naturally in Sumatra, Peninsular Malaysia, Singapore and Thailand.
