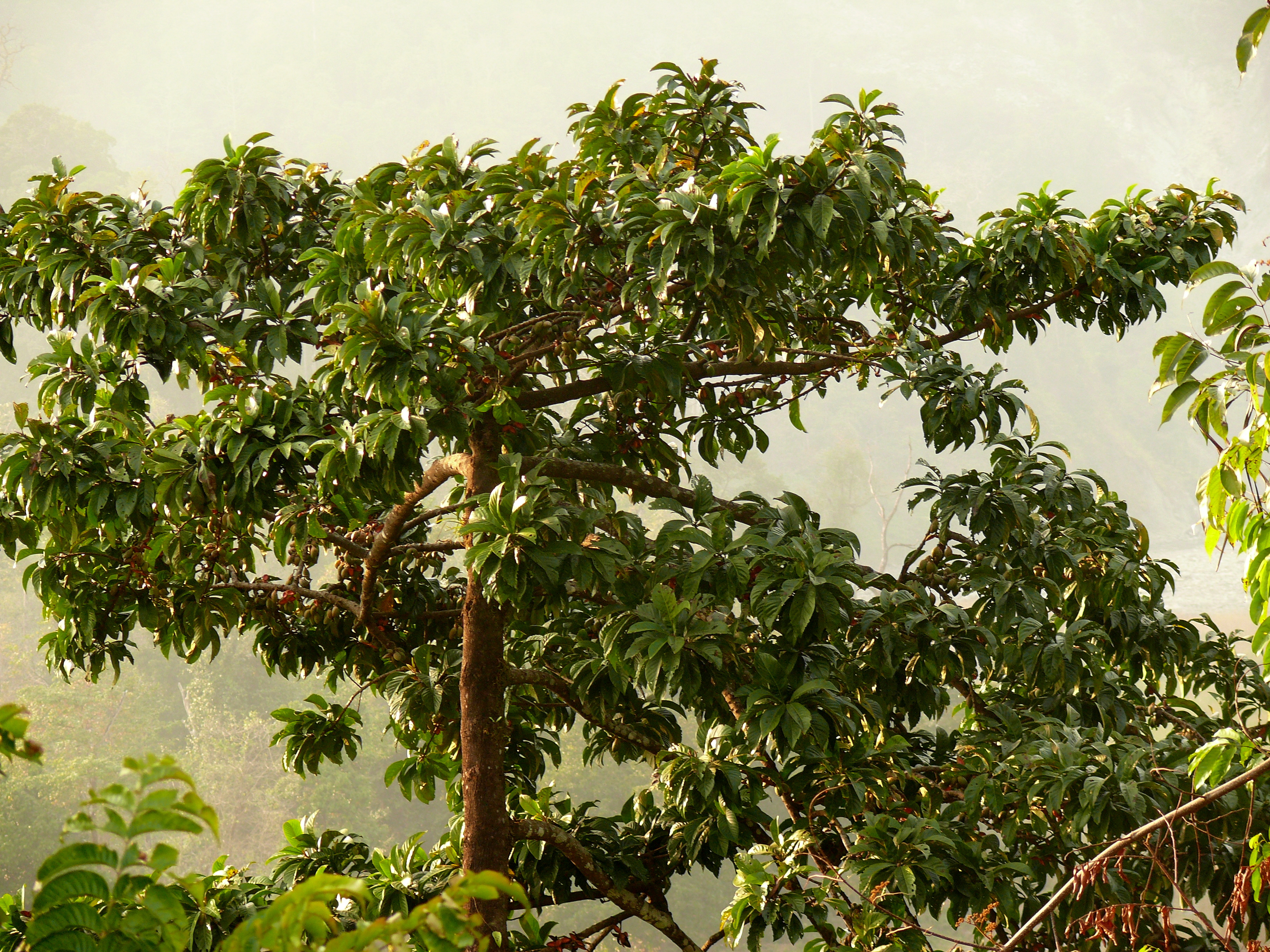
- Horsfieldia kingii habit

Scientific classification
- Kingdom: Plantae
- Clade: Tracheophytes
- Clade: Angiosperms
- Clade: Magnoliids
- Order: Magnoliales
- Family: Myristicaceae
- Genus: Horsfieldia; Willd.

Type species
- Horsfieldia odorata Willd.

Synonyms
- Jryaghedi Kuntze; Pyrrhosa (Blume) Endl.

= Horsfieldia =

Genus of flowering plants

Horsfieldia is a genus of evergreen trees. The genus consists of about 100 species and is distributed across South Asia, from India to the Philippines and Papua New Guinea. Some species are used for timber. Species in the genus sometimes contain alkaloids, including horsfiline, which has analgesic effects.

== Species ==
Plants of the World Online currently (February 2024) includes:

- Horsfieldia ampla Markgr.
- Horsfieldia ampliformis W.J.de Wilde
- Horsfieldia amplomontana W.J.de Wilde
- Horsfieldia amygdalina (Wall.) Warb.
- Horsfieldia androphora W.J.de Wilde
- Horsfieldia angularis W.J.de Wilde
- Horsfieldia ardisiifolia (A.DC.) Warb.
- Horsfieldia aruana (Blume) W.J.de Wilde
- Horsfieldia atjehensis W.J.de Wilde
- Horsfieldia australiana S.T.Blake
- Horsfieldia basifissa W.J.de Wilde
- Horsfieldia borneensis W.J.de Wilde
- Horsfieldia brachiata (King) Warb.
- Horsfieldia carnosa Warb.
- Horsfieldia clavata W.J.de Wilde
- Horsfieldia coriacea W.J.de Wilde
- Horsfieldia corrugata Foreman
- Horsfieldia coryandra W.J.de Wilde
- Horsfieldia costulata (Miq.) Warb.
- Horsfieldia crassifolia (Hook.f. & Thomson) Warb.
- Horsfieldia crux-melitensis Markgr.
- Horsfieldia decalvata W.J.de Wilde
- Horsfieldia discolor W.J.de Wilde
- Horsfieldia disticha W.J.de Wilde
- Horsfieldia elongata W.J.de Wilde
- Horsfieldia endertii W.J.de Wilde
- Horsfieldia flocculosa (King) Warb.
- Horsfieldia fragillima Airy Shaw
- Horsfieldia fulva (King) Warb.
- Horsfieldia glabra (Blume) Warb.
- Horsfieldia gracilis W.J.de Wilde
- Horsfieldia grandis (Hook.f.) Warb.
- Horsfieldia hellwigii (Warb.) Warb.
- Horsfieldia hirtiflora W.J.de Wilde
- Horsfieldia inflexa W.J.de Wilde
- Horsfieldia iriana W.J.de Wilde
- Horsfieldia irya (Gaertn.) Warb.
- Horsfieldia iryaghedhi (Gaertn.) Warb.
- Horsfieldia kingii (Hook.f.) Warb.
- Horsfieldia laevigata (Blume) Warb.
- Horsfieldia lancifolia W.J.de Wilde
- Horsfieldia laticostata (J.Sinclair) W.J.de Wilde
- Horsfieldia leptantha W.J.de Wilde
- Horsfieldia longiflora W.J.de Wilde
- Horsfieldia macilenta W.J.de Wilde
- Horsfieldia macrothyrsa (Miq.) Warb.
- Horsfieldia majuscula (King) Warb.
- Horsfieldia micrantha W.J.de Wilde
- Horsfieldia moluccana W.J.de Wilde
- Horsfieldia montana Airy Shaw
- Horsfieldia motleyi Warb.
- Horsfieldia nervosa W.J.de Wilde
- Horsfieldia obscura W.J.de Wilde
- Horsfieldia obscurinervia Merr.
- Horsfieldia obtusa W.J.de Wilde
- Horsfieldia olens W.J.de Wilde
- Horsfieldia oligocarpa Warb.
- Horsfieldia oliviformis Warb.
- Horsfieldia pachycarpa A.C.Sm.
- Horsfieldia pachyrachis W.J.de Wilde
- Horsfieldia palauensis Kaneh.
- Horsfieldia pallidicaula W.J.de Wilde
- Horsfieldia parviflora (Roxb.) J.Sinclair
- Horsfieldia paucinervis Warb.
- Horsfieldia penangiana J.Sinclair
- Horsfieldia pilifera Markgr.
- Horsfieldia platantha W.J.de Wilde
- Horsfieldia polyspherula (Hook.f.) J.Sinclair
- Horsfieldia psilantha W.J.de Wilde
- Horsfieldia pulcherrima W.J.de Wilde
- Horsfieldia pulverulenta Warb.
- Horsfieldia punctata W.J.de Wilde
- Horsfieldia punctatifolia J.Sinclair
- Horsfieldia ralunensis Warb.
- Horsfieldia reticulata Warb.
- Horsfieldia ridleyana (King) Warb.
- Horsfieldia romblonensis W.J.de Wilde
- Horsfieldia rufolanata Airy Shaw
- Horsfieldia sabulosa J.Sinclair
- Horsfieldia samarensis W.J.de Wilde
- Horsfieldia schlechteri Warb.
- Horsfieldia sepikensis Markgr.
- Horsfieldia sessilifolia W.J.de Wilde
- Horsfieldia sinclairii W.J.de Wilde
- Horsfieldia smithii Warb.
- Horsfieldia sparsa W.J.de Wilde
- Horsfieldia spicata (Roxb.) J.Sinclair
- Horsfieldia splendida W.J.de Wilde
- Horsfieldia squamulosa W.J.de Wilde
- Horsfieldia sterilis W.J.de Wilde
- Horsfieldia subalpina J.Sinclair
- Horsfieldia subtilis (Miq.) Warb.
- Horsfieldia sucosa (King) Warb.
- Horsfieldia superba (Hook.f. & Thomson) Warb.
- Horsfieldia sylvestris (Houtt.) Warb.
- Horsfieldia talaudensis W.J.de Wilde
- Horsfieldia tenuifolia (J.Sinclair) W.J.de Wilde
- Horsfieldia tomentosa Warb.
- Horsfieldia triandra W.J.de Wilde
- Horsfieldia tristis W.J.de Wilde
- Horsfieldia tuberculata (K.Schum.) Warb.
- Horsfieldia urceolata W.J.de Wilde
- Horsfieldia valida (Miq.) Warb.
- Horsfieldia wallichii (Hook.f. & Thomson) Warb.
- Horsfieldia whitmorei J.Sinclair
- Horsfieldia xanthina Airy Shaw

List sources :
