= Dana von Suffrin =

German writer (born 1985)

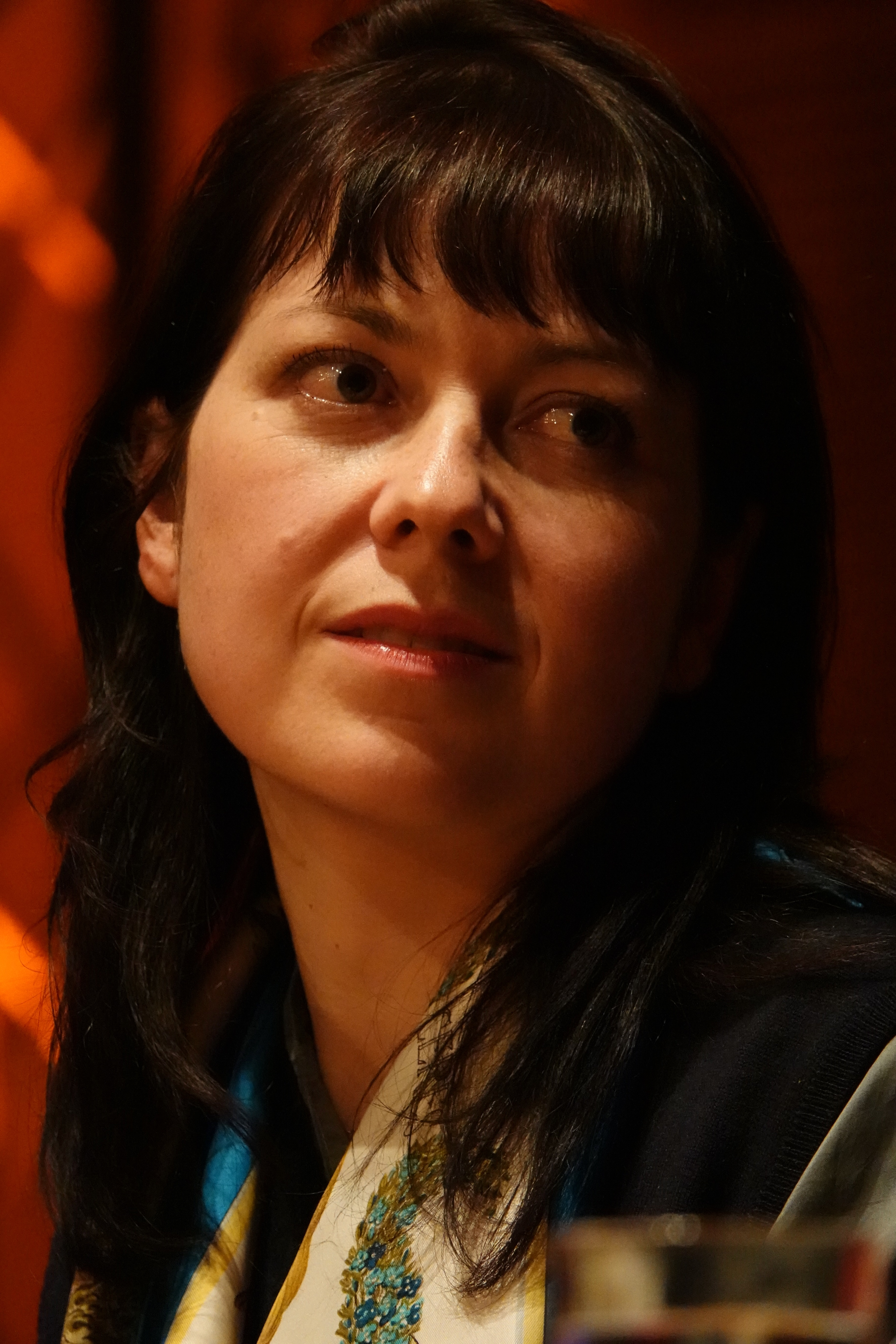
- Suffrin in 2024
- Born: 1985 (age 40–41); Munich, Germany
- Occupation: Writer
- Writing career
- Period: 2019-present
- Notable work: Otto, Nochmal von vorn
- Notable awards: Bavarian Arts and Literary Prize, Friedrich-Hölderlin-Preis
- Website: Dana von Suffrin at her publisher's website

Dana von Suffrin (born 1985 in Munich) is a German writer. She became known for her first two novels, Otto (2019) and Nochmal von vorn (2024), telling stories about German-Jewish families in Germany and Israel. For both works, she received literary awards.

== Life and career ==
Suffrin grew up in Munich and studied political science, Jewish history and culture, as well as general and comparative literature in Munich, Naples and Jerusalem from 2004 to 2012. In 2017, she completed her PhD at LMU Munich titled Plants for Palestine: Natural Sciences in the Yishuv, 1900-1930, focusing on the work of German botanist Otto Warburg.

Suffrin also worked for some time as research associate and coordinator of the Deutsche Forschungsgemeinschaft research group "Cooperation and Competition in the Sciences" at the Chair of the History of Science at LMU Munich.

In 2019, she published her first novel Otto about a dysfunctional Jewish family. Otto, the main character, is a Jew from Transylvania, who lives in Munich and is getting close to the end of his life. Suffrin named Eastern European, end-of-the-19th century poets who emigrated to New York as an important source of inspiration for her novel. In the narrative form, she was inspired, among others, by Natalia Ginzburg, whose family history included a strong father figure as well.

The novel received six literary prizes, including the awards for debut novels by the German Buddenbrook House and the Hamburg Harbour Front Literature Festival. Before that, she had received feedback from participants at a literary workshop that her novel "decidedly went too far, that it was not acceptable to write about the Holocaust in such a comical way and that her book also had no plot and no development".

In 2022, her radio drama Blut ("Blood") was nominated for the German public broadcasting stations' radio play prize.

In 2024, her second novel Nochmal von vorne ("Once More from the Top") was published, about a contemporary German-Jewish family, and taking place between Munich and Tel Aviv. The same year, this novel was longlisted for the German Book Prize. In addition to writing, Suffrin has also been conducting literary workshops, for example for the Literaturhaus München.

=== Comments on Jewish life in Germany ===
Suffrin repeatedly has made statements about Judaism and Antisemitism, both from her own biographical perspective, as well as saying that the focus in Germany on the Nazi main perpetrators has hindered further research into the history of National Socialism. Further, she criticized that Jewish authors are often not simply interviewed as artists, such as other writers, but are constantly reduced to making comments about their Jewish identity. On this, she said "I no longer want to be the governess that takes turns admonishing Germans and then praises them again for their exemplary coming to terms with their past, for their unique culture of remembrance (Erinnerungskultur), or for the many beautiful memorial sites and museums".

In response to the 2023 Hamas-led attack on Israel, she also expressed the disappointment of Jewish millennials about anti-Semitism in the left-wing cultural scene in Germany and her disillusionment that her parents' warning against anti-Semitism was obviously justified.

=== Critical reception ===
In a review of August 2019, the Süddeutsche Zeitung called her novel Otto "very funny and, at the same time, incredibly sad." The review further commented on the author's treatment of how much of an older generation, especially one that has gone through so many hard times, is passed on to the next generation. It also noted a special kind of language and melody of the sentences giving the impression of coming "directly from Yiddish literature of the 19th and early 20th centuries".

The jury statement for the Bayerischer Kunstförderpreis (Bavarian Arts and Literary Prize) for literature said that Suffrin had created "an unsentimental monument to the father figure, a tyrannical Jewish Transylvanian", in her "complicated, fragmentary family history." Further, she was credited with black humour, as she had included themes as diverse as "dysfunctional families, Jewish life in Munich, old age and illness."

Suffrin has received several literary prizes and awards as writer-in-residence, for example at the Monacensia library in Munich. Further, she has been invited for residencies in other European countries, such as the Jan Michalski Foundation for Writing and Literature in Switzerland and the Sofia Literature and Translation House in Bulgaria.

== Works ==
=== Novels ===
- Otto. Kiepenheuer & Witsch, Cologne 2019, ISBN 978-3-462-05257-2.
- Noch mal von vorne. Kiepenheuer & Witsch, Cologne 2024, ISBN 978-3-462-00297-3.

=== Short stories ===
- Gurren und Picken. Maxim Biller im Kopf von Bruno Schulz. In Kai Sina (ed.) Im Kopf von Maxim Biller. Kiepenheuer & Witsch, Cologne 2020, pp. 143–147.
- Los der Dinge (short story). In Kristof Magnusson (ed.). Aspekte, 1/20, Hanser, Munich 2020.
- A Jewish family and its stories, translated by Jen Calleja. In Brixton Review of Books 7/2020.
- Lucian (short story). In Leander Steinkopf (ed.) Neue Schule, Ullstein, Berlin 2021, pp. 195–218.
