= Horsfieldia iriana =

Conservation status
- Data Deficient (IUCN 3.1)

Scientific classification
- Kingdom: Plantae
- Clade: Embryophytes
- Clade: Tracheophytes
- Clade: Spermatophytes
- Clade: Angiosperms
- Clade: Magnoliids
- Order: Magnoliales
- Family: Myristicaceae
- Genus: Horsfieldia
- Species: H. iriana

Binomial name
- Horsfieldia iriana W.J.de Wilde

Species of flowering plant

Horsfieldia iriana is a species of plant in the family Myristicaceae. It is endemic to West Papua (Indonesia).
