= Horsfieldia grandis =

Conservation status
- Least Concern (IUCN 3.1)

Scientific classification
- Kingdom: Plantae
- Clade: Embryophytes
- Clade: Tracheophytes
- Clade: Spermatophytes
- Clade: Angiosperms
- Clade: Magnoliids
- Order: Magnoliales
- Family: Myristicaceae
- Genus: Horsfieldia
- Species: H. grandis

Binomial name
- Horsfieldia grandis (Hook.f.) Warb.

Synonyms
- Myristica grandis Hook.f. (1860); Myristica rubiginosa King

Species of flowering plant

Horsfieldia grandis is a species of flowering plant in the family Myristicaceae. It is found in Borneo, Peninsular Malaysia, Singapore, and Sumatra.

The species was first described as Myristica grandis by Joseph Dalton Hooker in 1860. In 1897 Otto Warburg placed the species in genus Horsfieldia as H. grandis.
