= Horsfieldia sepikensis =

Conservation status
- Critically Endangered (IUCN 3.1)

Scientific classification
- Kingdom: Plantae
- Clade: Tracheophytes
- Clade: Angiosperms
- Clade: Magnoliids
- Order: Magnoliales
- Family: Myristicaceae
- Genus: Horsfieldia
- Species: H. sepikensis

Binomial name
- Horsfieldia sepikensis Markgr.

Synonyms
- Homotypic Synonyms: Horsfieldia spicata var. scpikensis (Markgr.) J.Sinclair

Species of flowering plant

Horsfieldia sepikensis is a species of flowering plant in the family Myristicaceae. It is endemic to Papua New Guinea.
