= Horsfieldia disticha =

Conservation status
- Data Deficient (IUCN 3.1)

Scientific classification
- Kingdom: Plantae
- Clade: Embryophytes
- Clade: Tracheophytes
- Clade: Spermatophytes
- Clade: Angiosperms
- Clade: Magnoliids
- Order: Magnoliales
- Family: Myristicaceae
- Genus: Horsfieldia
- Species: H. disticha

Binomial name
- Horsfieldia disticha W.J.de Wilde

Species of flowering plant

Horsfieldia disticha is a species of plant in the family Myristicaceae. It is endemic to Brunei.
