= Horsfieldia coriacea =

Conservation status
- Near Threatened (IUCN 2.3)

Scientific classification
- Kingdom: Plantae
- Clade: Tracheophytes
- Clade: Angiosperms
- Clade: Magnoliids
- Order: Magnoliales
- Family: Myristicaceae
- Genus: Horsfieldia
- Species: H. coriacea

Binomial name
- Horsfieldia coriacea W.J.de Wilde

Species of tree

Horsfieldia coriacea is a species of plant in the family Myristicaceae. It is a tree endemic to Sulawesi in Indonesia.
