= Horsfieldia whitmorei =

Conservation status
- Least Concern (IUCN 3.1)

Scientific classification
- Kingdom: Plantae
- Clade: Tracheophytes
- Clade: Angiosperms
- Clade: Magnoliids
- Order: Magnoliales
- Family: Myristicaceae
- Genus: Horsfieldia
- Species: H. whitmorei

Binomial name
- Horsfieldia whitmorei J.Sinclair

Species of flowering plant

Horsfieldia whitmorei is a species of flowering plant in the family Myristicaceae. It is endemic to the Solomon Islands and the Autonomous Region of Bougainville in Papua New Guinea,, where it grows in old-growth and second-growth rain forests.
