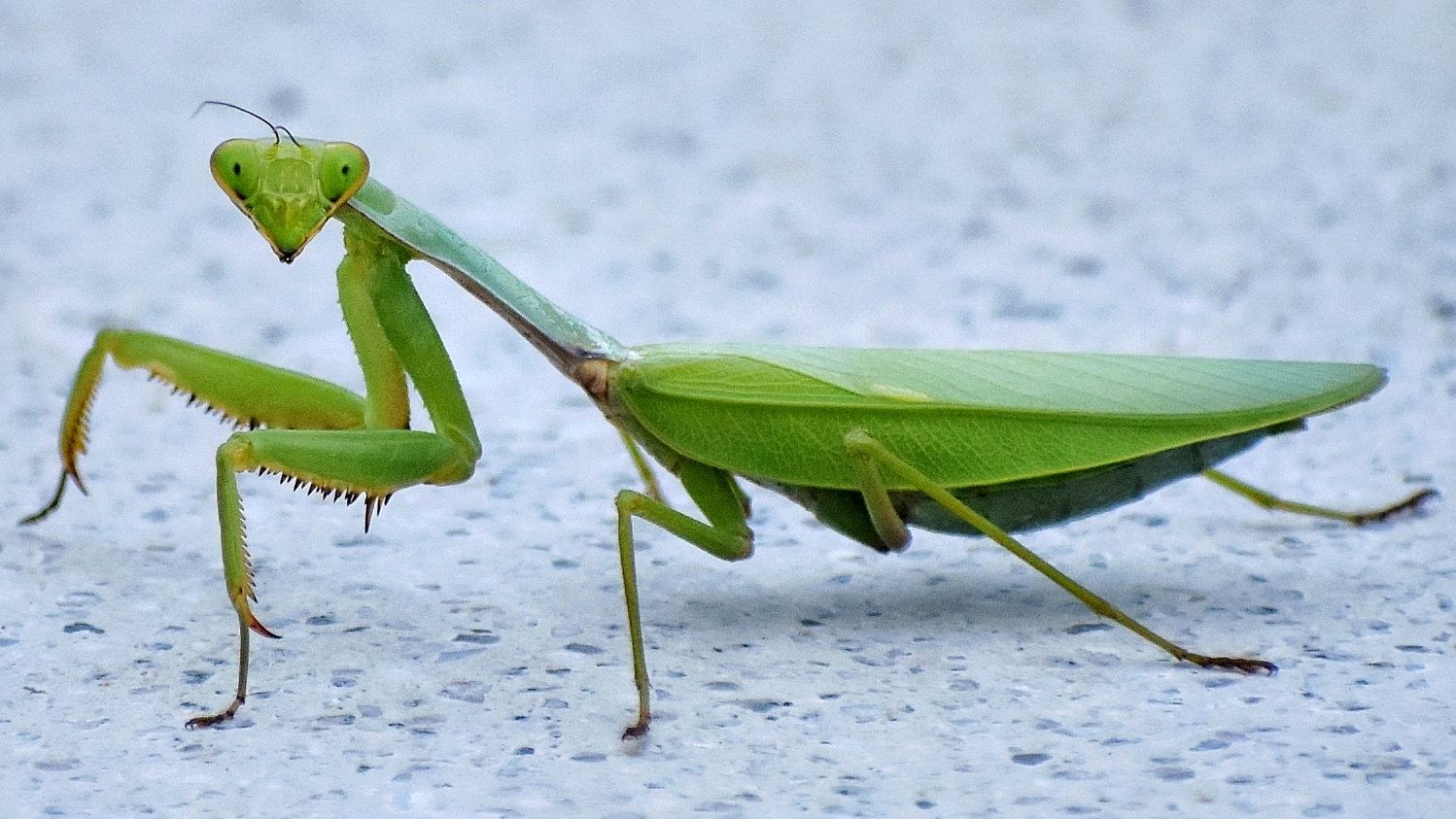
- in China
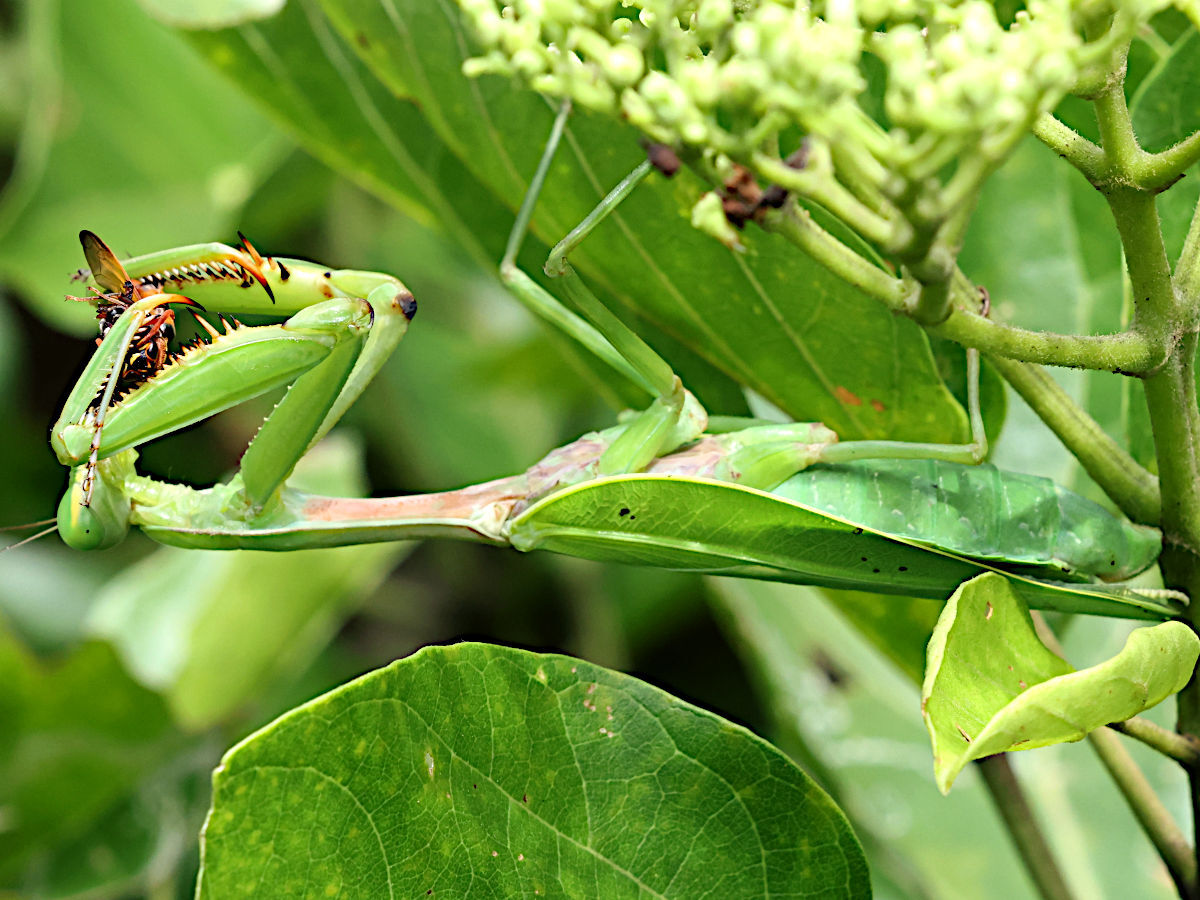
- in Taiwan

Scientific classification
- Kingdom: Animalia
- Phylum: Arthropoda
- Clade: Pancrustacea
- Class: Insecta
- Order: Mantodea
- Family: Mantidae
- Genus: Titanodula
- Species: T. formosana

Binomial name
- Titanodula formosana (Giglio-Tos, 1912)

Synonyms
- Hierodula formosana Giglio-Tos, 1912

= Titanodula formosana =

Species of praying mantis

Titanodula formosana, also known as the Formosan giant mantis, is a species of praying mantis in the subfamily Hierodulinae. T. formosana is found in China, Taiwan, Malaysia and the Sunda islands.

== Taxonomy ==
T. formosana was originally placed in Hierodula, but a 2020 study moved the species to a new genus, Titanodula, based on its large size and the unique shape of the male genitalia.
