= Monacensia =

Archive, museum and library in Munich, Germany

Monacensia im Hildebrandhaus
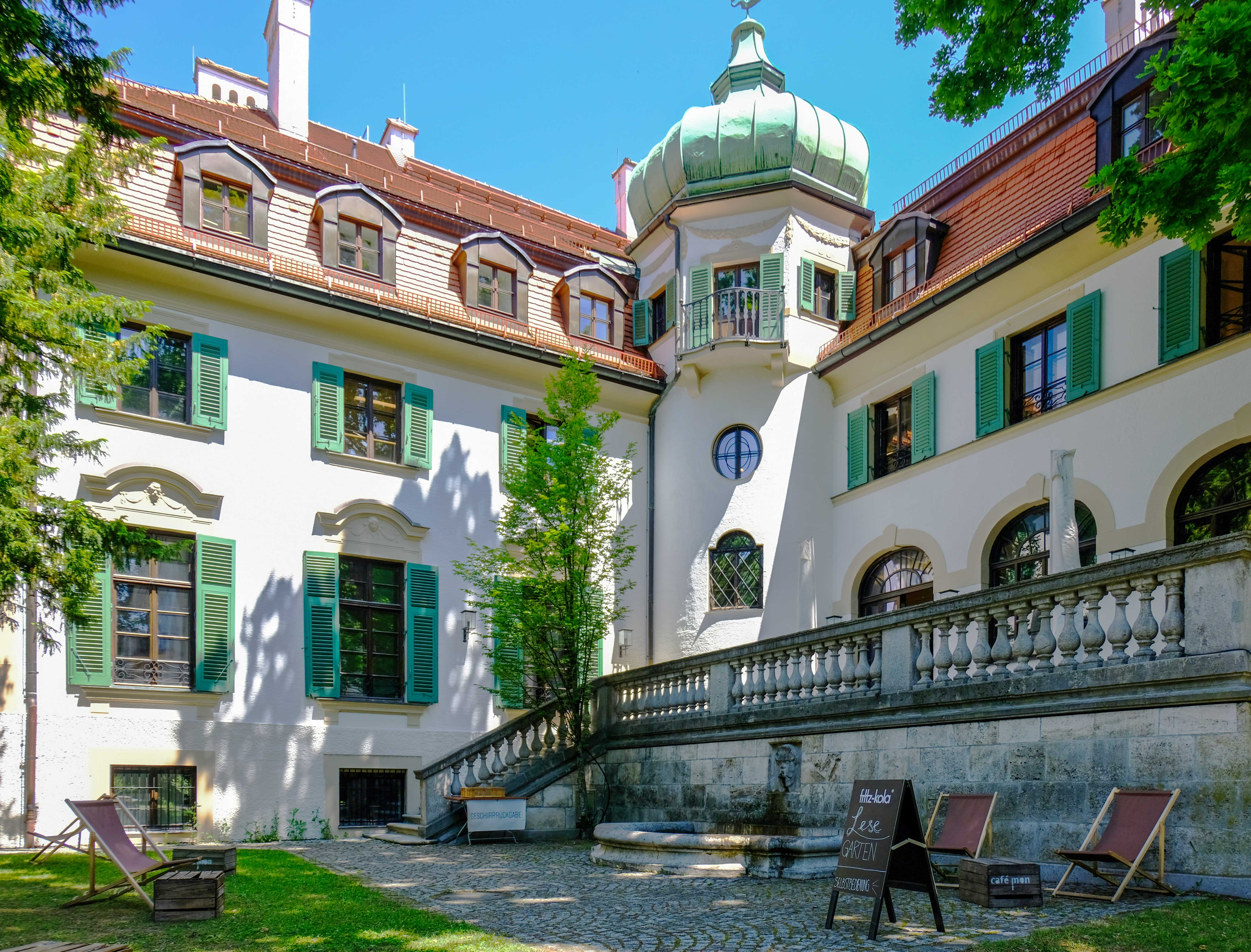
- Location: Maria-Theresia-Straße 23, Munich, Germany, Germany
- Type: archive, museum and library
- Scope: 1500 to present
- Established: 1921; 105 years ago
- Architects: Gabriel von Seidl; Adolph von Hildebrand
- Branch of: Munich City Library

Collection
- Size: 350,000

Other information
- Director: Anke Buettner
- Website: www.muenchner-stadtbibliothek.de/monacensia-im-hildebrandhaus

The Monacensia, or Monacensia in Hildebrandhaus, is the literary archive, a museum and a research library of the city of Munich, the capital of Bavaria, Germany, which is devoted to preserving and providing public access to the city's cultural history. The name Monacensia is derived from the Latin name for Munich.

The collection was begun in the 1920s. Since 1977 it has been housed in a mansion, known as the Hildebrandhaus, which was originally designed by the German sculptor Adolf von Hildebrand (1847–1921) for his large artistic family. The Monacensia is one of the special libraries administered by the Munich City Library and its collections are accessible via the library website.

== Location ==
The Monacensia in Hildebrandhaus is located in the Munich borough of Bogenhausen along the river Isar, not far from the Angel of Peace monument. The mansion, which was built in 1898 by Gabriel von Seidl, based on Hildebrand's plans, is an example of architecture in the culturally productive period in Bavaria known as the Prinzregentenzeit, It became a gathering point for cultural elite of Munich in the early years of the 20th century. In the years between Hildebrand's death in 1921 and 1977 the mansion changed hands numerous times and served a number of very different purposes.

== History ==
In 1921 Hans Ludwig Held, the newly appointed first library director in Munich, issued a requisition for all city agencies to extract from their respective collections all books dealing with Munich and its cultural affairs. As a result, 5000 volumes were submitted by various administrative departments, such as the housing agency and the city museum, and housed in a separate room in the centrally located city hall. Despite considerable bombing during the Second World War, nearly all the library and archival holdings survived without notable damage. As the collection grew it was relocated several times, before moving into its current location in 1977. Between 2013 and 2016 the Hildebrandhaus was closed for general renovations and modernisation. The holdings of the Monacensia were housed temporarily at an external location.

== The collections ==
=== Literature archive ===
The collection comprises documentation and literary estates from approx. 300 writers who had or have a close connection with the city of Munich. Among others, the most renown writers include Oskar Maria Graf, Annette Kolb, Liesl Karlstadt, Frank Wedekind, Fanny Gräfin zu Reventlow, Gustav Meyrink, Ludwig Thoma, Ludwig Ganghofer and Jörg Hube. Further focal points of the collection are the life and works of writers in exile; the Schwaginger Bohème in the years around 1900; works by contemporary writers; and all forms of folk culture in Munich.

In the 1920s Hans Ludwig Held also laid the groundwork for collecting handwritten drafts and other original manuscripts from the leading writers of Munich and the region of Upper Bavaria. In the past hundert years this has grown into a highly diverse and valuable collection. For individual authors the archival holdings may include manuscripts, correspondence, biographical documents, photos, audio-visual documentation and personal belongings. Details of specific correspondence and manuscripts can be found at the online catalog of the Munich City Library and through Germany's national database Kalliope Union Catalogue, a union catalog for collections of personal papers, manuscripts, and publishers' archives.

With funding provided by the German Research Foundation (DFG) the Monacensia was able to acquire the diaries of Klaus Mann, the complete archival collection of Monika Mann, as well as the entire correspondence, manuscripts and biographical documents of Erika and Klaus Mann, in order to make these publicly available in digital form.

=== Monacensia Library ===
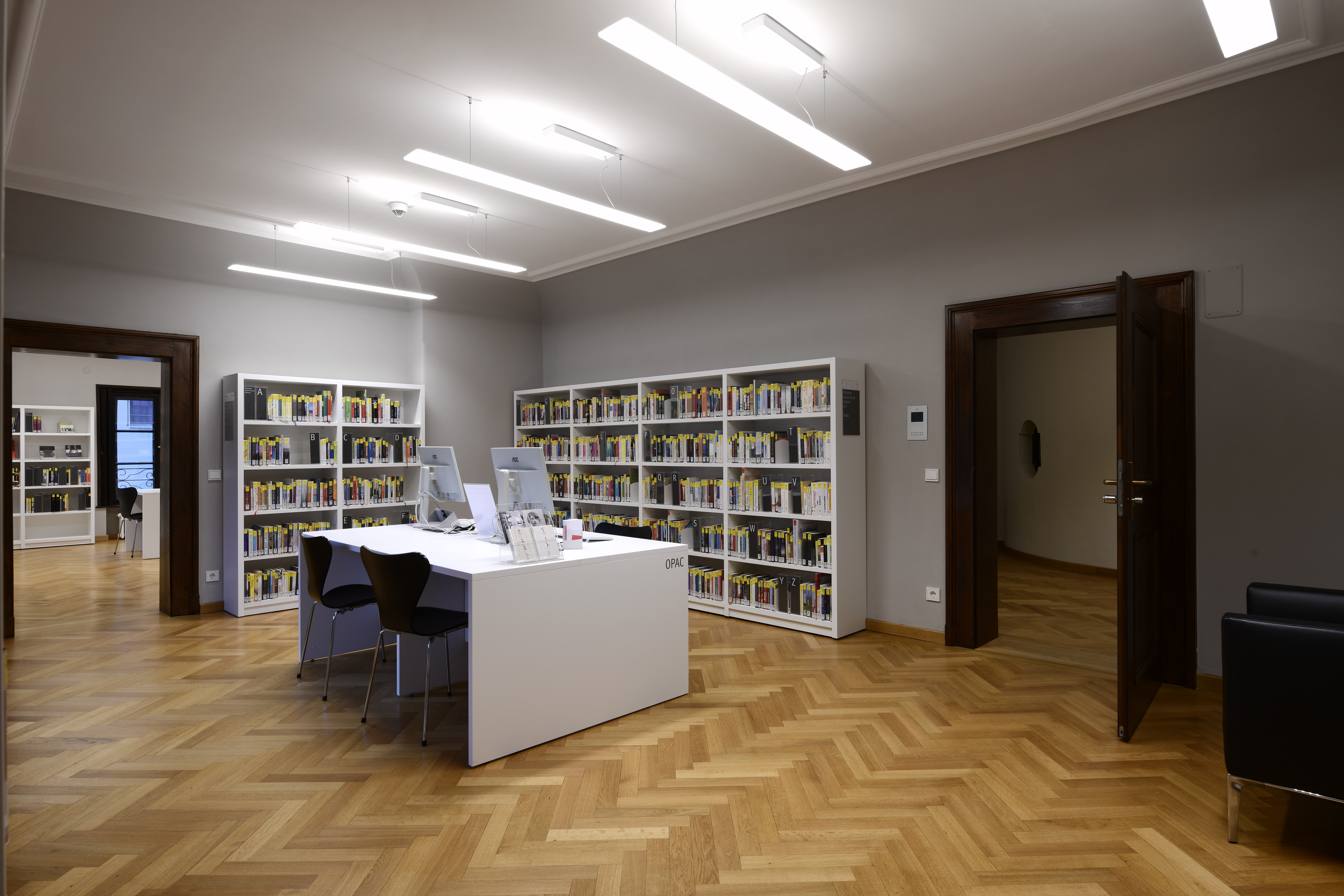
Library of Munich writers

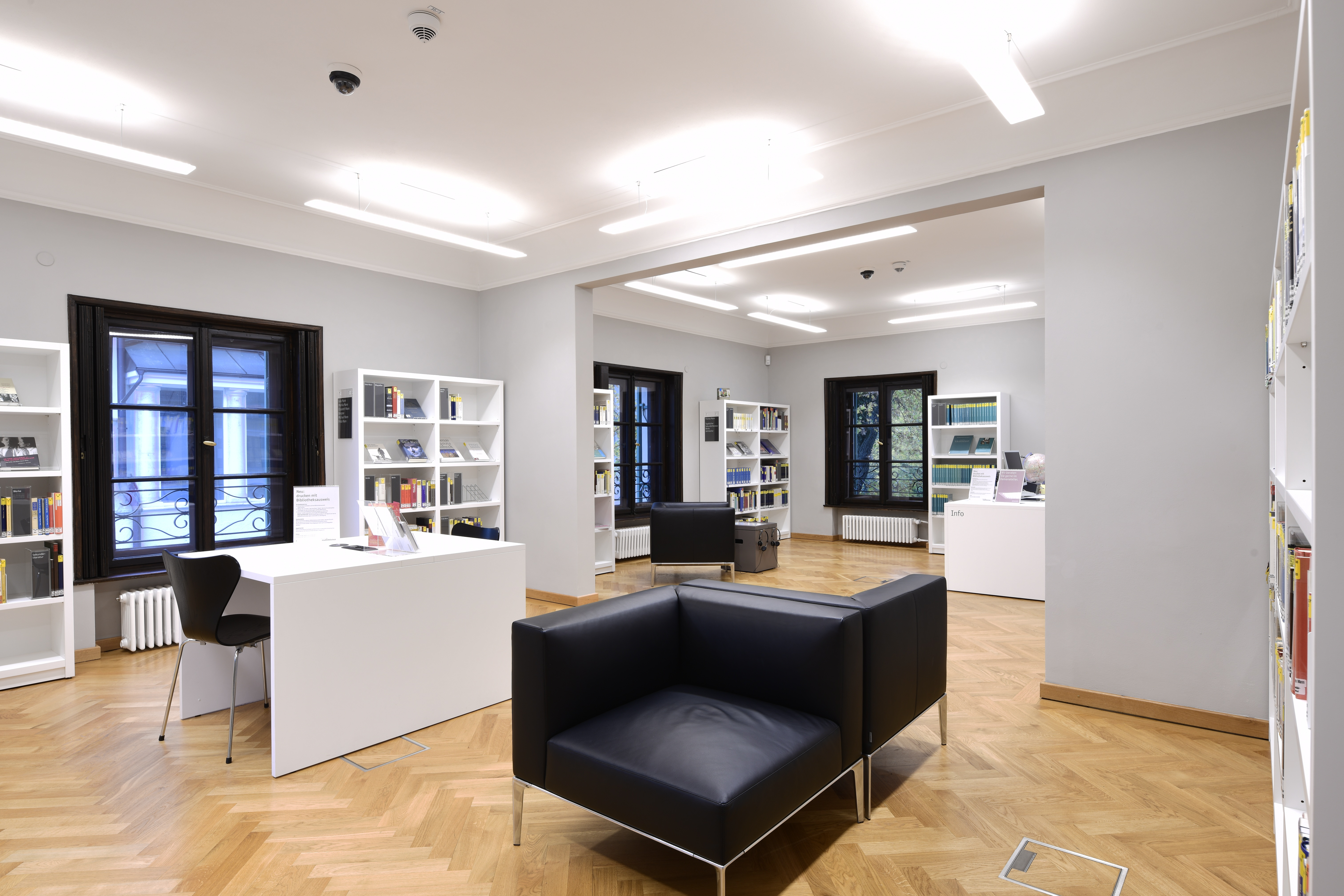
Library on the Mann family

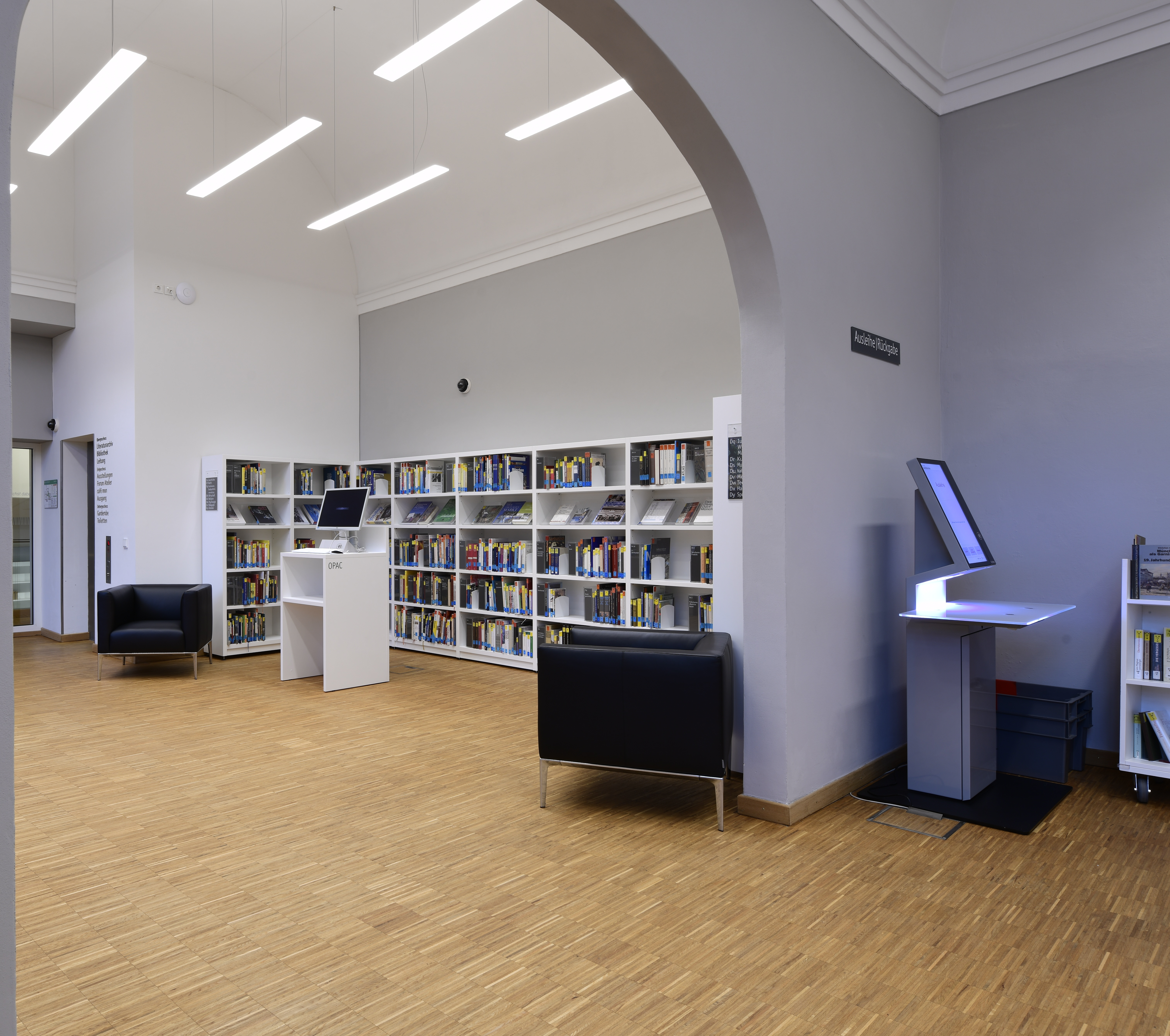
Library in the "Ladies' Atelier"

The research library encompasses around 150,000 books and other media dealing with various aspects of Munich. The primary focus is on Munich as a literar and cultural metropolis. The holdings range from works printed in Munich from the 16th century until today. Some of the holdings are immediately available to the public on open shelving and works published after 1960 can be borrowed.

The publicly accessible rooms of the library on the second floor are assigned different themes:

- the Library in the "Ladies' Atelier (the former ateliers of the daughters of Adolf von Hildebrand) holds books on the history, social history and economic history of the city, as well as on its literature, art and architecture. Books on science, medicine, technology as well as gardening, sport and leisure activities in connection with life in Munich are also included there.
- the Library of works by and about the Mann family includes sets of the complete works of the writers in the Mann family, printed volumes of correspondence, diaries, pictorial works. It also contains secondary literature about the Mann family.
- the Library of Munich writers presents a selection of works of current interest, as well as the library's focal themes of the Schwabing Bohème era, life in the 1920s in München, and literature by writers living in exile.

== Museum and public events ==
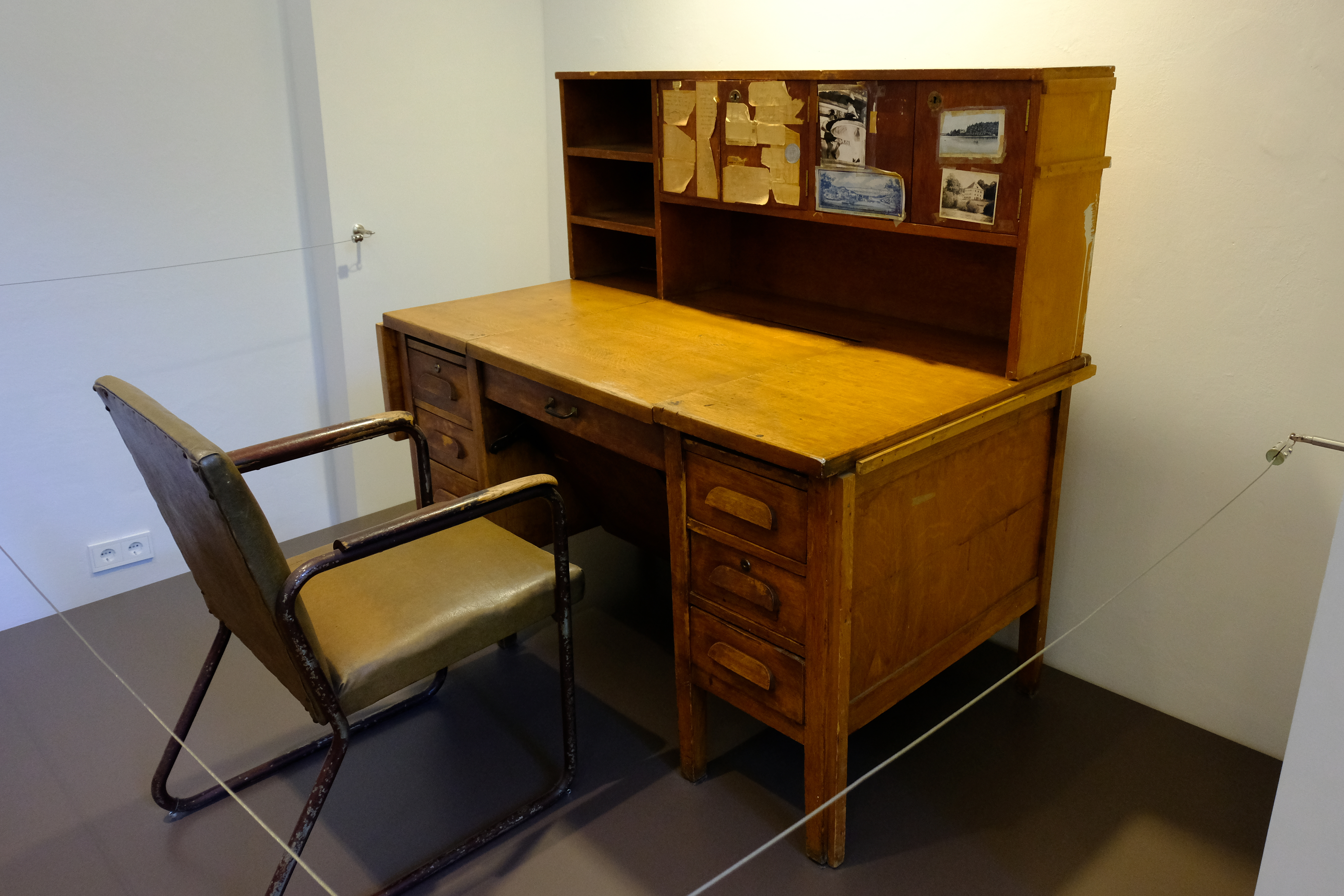
Desk of Oskar Maria Graf in the Monacensia's permanent exhibit area

The ground floor and the mezzanine of the Hildebrandhaus are open to the public during the working hours of the Monacensia. On the ground floor the Forum Atelier can be used as a venue for public events. It is adjacent to permanent exhibition rooms devoted to the documentation of "Literary Munich in the Thomas Mann Years" and the "History of the Hildebrandhaus". Other publicly accessible rooms show temporary exhibitions which showcase the Monacensia's collections.

In 2019 an exhibition titled "Erika Mann. Kabarettistin – Kriegsreporterin – Politische Rednerin" was the first exhibition to feature Erika Mann as a person in her own right, and not, as usual, as the daughter of Thomas Mann.

In addition to its permanent exhibition, special thematic exhibitions and publicly accessible collections, the Monacensia also offers a literary programme with the city's Folk high school, and special tours in collaboration with the city's Centre for Museum's Pedagogy, in particular for school classes. The Monacensia has cooperative agreements with the LMU Munich and the Munich Documentation Centre for the History of National Socialism. The results of research projects are published in Edition Monacensia.

Beginning in 2022 the Monacensia offers local writers the opportunity to be a writer in residence. Dana von Suffrin is the first author participating in the programme, which is sponsored by C.H. Beck, a Munich publishing house.

The Monacensia is a popular venue for public events. These include author readings, panel discussions, and scholarly lectures about research based on the library and archival holdings.

== Literature ==
- Elisabeth Tworek (ed.) with Ursula Hummel: Literatur im Archiv. Bestände der Monacensia. Monacensia, München 2002. (including a list of publications issued by the Monacensia and an index of its bequests)
- Christiane Kuller, Maximilian Schreiber: Das Hildebrandhaus. Eine Münchner Künstlervilla und ihre Bewohner in der Zeit des Nationalsoialismus (=Edition Monacensia). Munich: Allitera 2006, ISBN 386520130X Preview
- Christine Hoh-Slodczyk: Das Haus des Künstlers im 19. Jahrhundert. Prestel, München 1985, S. 121–128.
- Dietrich Sattler: Adolf von Hildebrand und die Architektur. Buchner, München 1932.
