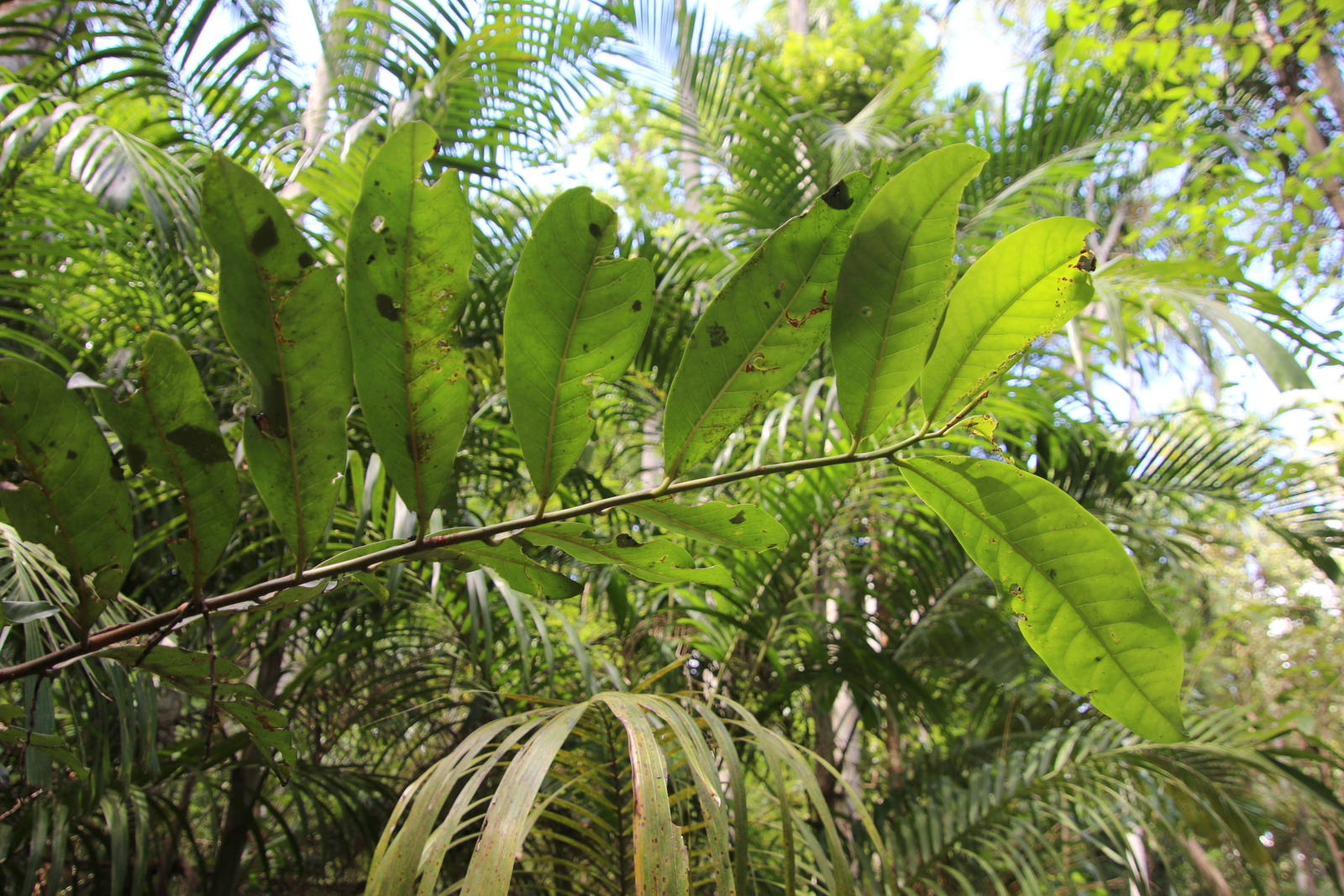
- Litchfield National Park, Australia

Conservation status
- Least Concern (IUCN 3.1)

Scientific classification
- Kingdom: Plantae
- Clade: Embryophytes
- Clade: Tracheophytes
- Clade: Spermatophytes
- Clade: Angiosperms
- Clade: Magnoliids
- Order: Magnoliales
- Family: Myristicaceae
- Genus: Horsfieldia
- Species: H. australiana

Binomial name
- Horsfieldia australiana S.T.Blake

= Horsfieldia australiana =

Cape nutmeg

Species of flowering plant

Horsfieldia australiana, commonly known as the Cape nutmeg, is a species of tropical rainforest tree in the family Myristicaceae. It is found in the northern Northern Territory and northern Queensland in Australia and in eastern New Guinea in Papua New Guinea.
