= Horsfieldia ampliformis =

Conservation status
- Endangered (IUCN 3.1)

Scientific classification
- Kingdom: Plantae
- Clade: Embryophytes
- Clade: Tracheophytes
- Clade: Spermatophytes
- Clade: Angiosperms
- Clade: Magnoliids
- Order: Magnoliales
- Family: Myristicaceae
- Genus: Horsfieldia
- Species: H. ampliformis

Binomial name
- Horsfieldia ampliformis W.J.de Wilde

Species of flowering plant

Horsfieldia ampliformis is a small rainforest tree in the family Myristicaceae, endemic to Papua New Guinea. It is only known to exist in the former Sepik Province (now East Sepik and Sandaun Provinces) and Morobe Province, where it grows in rainforests in the foothills and low areas of mountains.
