= Horsfieldia triandra =

Conservation status
- Endangered (IUCN 3.1)

Scientific classification
- Kingdom: Plantae
- Clade: Embryophytes
- Clade: Tracheophytes
- Clade: Spermatophytes
- Clade: Angiosperms
- Clade: Magnoliids
- Order: Magnoliales
- Family: Myristicaceae
- Genus: Horsfieldia
- Species: H. triandra

Binomial name
- Horsfieldia triandra W.J.de Wilde

Species of tree

Horsfieldia triandra is a species of flowering plant in the family Myristicaceae. It is a tree endemic to central and southern Sumatra.
