= Horsfieldia samarensis =

Conservation status
- Critically Endangered (IUCN 3.1)

Scientific classification
- Kingdom: Plantae
- Clade: Embryophytes
- Clade: Tracheophytes
- Clade: Spermatophytes
- Clade: Angiosperms
- Clade: Magnoliids
- Order: Magnoliales
- Family: Myristicaceae
- Genus: Horsfieldia
- Species: H. samarensis

Binomial name
- Horsfieldia samarensis W.J.de Wilde

Species of flowering plant

Horsfieldia samarensis is a species of plant in the family Myristicaceae. It is endemic to the Philippines.
