= Horsfieldia tenuifolia =

Conservation status
- Vulnerable (IUCN 2.3)

Scientific classification
- Kingdom: Plantae
- Clade: Embryophytes
- Clade: Tracheophytes
- Clade: Spermatophytes
- Clade: Angiosperms
- Clade: Magnoliids
- Order: Magnoliales
- Family: Myristicaceae
- Genus: Horsfieldia
- Species: H. tenuifolia

Binomial name
- Horsfieldia tenuifolia (J.Sinclair) W.J.de Wilde

Synonyms
- Horsfieldia polyspherula var. tenuifolia J.Sinclair

Species of tree

Horsfieldia tenuifolia is a species of flowering plant in the family Myristicaceae. It is a tree endemic to Borneo.
