= Horsfieldia ampla =

Conservation status
- Endangered (IUCN 3.1)

Scientific classification
- Kingdom: Plantae
- Clade: Embryophytes
- Clade: Tracheophytes
- Clade: Spermatophytes
- Clade: Angiosperms
- Clade: Magnoliids
- Order: Magnoliales
- Family: Myristicaceae
- Genus: Horsfieldia
- Species: H. ampla

Binomial name
- Horsfieldia ampla Markgr.

Species of flowering plant

Horsfieldia ampla is a small (4–5 m tall) rare tree with small (4×2 mm) yellow flowers in the family Myristicaceae, known only from its type collection (the original type specimen used to describe it has been lost). It is endemic to Papua New Guinea, where it is only found in those provinces associated with the Sepik river (East Sepik and Sandaun, together formerly known as Sepik Province), growing in dense humid forest.
