= Horsfieldia montana =

Conservation status
- Near Threatened (IUCN 2.3)

Scientific classification
- Kingdom: Plantae
- Clade: Tracheophytes
- Clade: Angiosperms
- Clade: Magnoliids
- Order: Magnoliales
- Family: Myristicaceae
- Genus: Horsfieldia
- Species: H. montana

Binomial name
- Horsfieldia montana Airy Shaw

Species of tree

Horsfieldia montana is a species of plant in the family Myristicaceae. It is a tree endemic to Borneo. The Latin specific epithet montana refers to mountains or coming from mountains.
