= Horsfieldia parviflora =

Conservation status
- Least Concern (IUCN 2.3)

Scientific classification
- Kingdom: Plantae
- Clade: Embryophytes
- Clade: Tracheophytes
- Clade: Spermatophytes
- Clade: Angiosperms
- Clade: Magnoliids
- Order: Magnoliales
- Family: Myristicaceae
- Genus: Horsfieldia
- Species: H. parviflora

Binomial name
- Horsfieldia parviflora (Roxb.) J.Sinclair

Synonyms
- Horsfieldia bivalvis Merr.; Horsfieldia globularia Warb.; Horsfieldia globularia var. minahassae Warb.; Horsfieldia minahassae (Warb.) Koord.; Knema tingens (Blume) Peterm.; Myristica bivalvis Hook.f.; Myristica globularia Blume; Myristica minahassae Boerl.; Myristica parviflora Roxb. (1832); Myristica punicifolia Roxb.; Myristica tingens Blume; Palala bivalvis (Hook.f.) Kuntze; Palala parviflora (Roxb.) Kuntze; Palala tingens (Blume) Kuntze

Species of tree

Horsfieldia parviflora is a species of flowering plant in the family Myristicaceae. It is a tree native to the Maluku Islands and Sulawesi.

The species was first described as Myristica parvifolia by William Roxburgh in 1832. In 1975 James Sinclair placed the species in genus Horsfieldia as H. parvifolia. The species has over a dozen synonyms.
