= Titanodula fruhstorferi =

Scientific classification
- Kingdom: Animalia
- Phylum: Arthropoda
- Clade: Pancrustacea
- Class: Insecta
- Order: Mantodea
- Family: Mantidae
- Genus: Titanodula
- Species: T. fruhstorferi

Binomial name
- Titanodula fruhstorferi (Werner, 1916)

Synonyms
- Hierodula fruhstorferi Werner, 1916

Species of praying mantis

Titanodula fruhstorferi is a praying mantis species in the subfamily Hierodulinae.

This species may be endemic to Vietnam.

== Taxonomy ==
T. fruhstorferi was originally placed in Hierodula, but a 2020 study moved the species to a new genus, Titanodula, based on its large size and the unique shape of the male genitalia.
