= Horsfieldia androphora =

Conservation status
- Vulnerable (IUCN 2.3)

Scientific classification
- Kingdom: Plantae
- Clade: Embryophytes
- Clade: Tracheophytes
- Clade: Spermatophytes
- Clade: Angiosperms
- Clade: Magnoliids
- Order: Magnoliales
- Family: Myristicaceae
- Genus: Horsfieldia
- Species: H. androphora

Binomial name
- Horsfieldia androphora W.J.de Wilde

Species of tree

Horsfieldia androphora is a species of plant in the family Myristicaceae. It is a tree endemic to Borneo.
