= Cipargamin =

Antimalarial compound

Names
- Systematic IUPAC name (1′R,3′S)-5,7′-Dichloro-6′-fluoro-3′-methyl-2′,3′,4′,9′-tetrahydrospiro[indole-3,1′-pyrido[3,4-b]indol]-2(1H)-one

Identifiers
CAS Number	1193314-23-6
3D model (JSmol)	Interactive image
ChEMBL	ChEMBL1082723
ChemSpider	24662493
DrugBank	DB12306
IUPHAR/BPS	9721
PubChem CID	44469321
UNII	Z7Q4FWA04P
CompTox Dashboard (EPA)	DTXSID70152424
- InChI: InChI=1S/C19H14Cl2FN3O/c1-8-4-11-10-6-14(22)13(21)7-16(10)23-17(11)19(25-8)12-5-9(20)2-3-15(12)24-18(19)26/h2-3,5-8,23,25H,4H2,1H3,(H,24,26)/t8-,19+/m0/s1 Key: CKLPLPZSUQEDRT-WPCRTTGESA-N; InChI=1/C19H14Cl2FN3O/c1-8-4-11-10-6-14(22)13(21)7-16(10)23-17(11)19(25-8)12-5-9(20)2-3-15(12)24-18(19)26/h2-3,5-8,23,25H,4H2,1H3,(H,24,26)/t8-,19+/m0/s1 Key: CKLPLPZSUQEDRT-WPCRTTGEBC
- SMILES: C[C@H]1Cc2c3cc(c(cc3[nH]c2[C@]4(N1)c5cc(ccc5NC4=O)Cl)Cl)F

Properties
Chemical formula	C_{19}H_{14}Cl_{2}FN_{3}O
Molar mass	390.24 g·mol^{−1}
- Except where otherwise noted, data are given for materials in their standard state (at 25 °C [77 °F], 100 kPa). Infobox references

Cipargamin (also known as KAE609 or NITD609) is a synthetic antimalarial compound belonging to the novel spiroindolone drug class. Developed by Novartis Institute for Tropical Diseases in Singapore, through a collaboration with the Genomics Institute of the Novartis Research Foundation (GNF), the Biomedical Primate Research Centre and the Swiss Tropical Institute, cipargamin represents a promising next-generation antimalarial drug currently undergoing Phase II clinical trials with a particular focus on safety evaluation. Cipargamin was awarded MMV Project of the Year 2009.

== Mechanism of action ==
Cipargamin exerts its antimalarial activity by targeting PfATP4, a P-type Na+ ATPase located on the plasma membrane of Plasmodium parasites. By inhibiting this essential sodium pump, cipargamin disrupts the sodium homeostasis within the parasite, leading to cell swelling and ultimately parasite death. This mechanism of action distinguishes cipargamin from existing antimalarial drugs, including artemisinin derivatives and other peroxide-based compounds.

== Structure-activity relationships ==
The spiroindolone structure of cipargamin features a complex stereochemical configuration that is critical for its antimalarial activity. Structure-activity relationship studies have demonstrated that the (1R,3S) stereochemical configuration is essential for optimal antimalarial potency. It is structurally related to GNF 493, a compound first identified as a potent inhibitor of Plasmodium falciparum growth in a high throughput phenotypic screen of natural products conducted at the Genomics Institute of the Novartis Research Foundation in San Diego, California in 2006.

== Clinical development ==
=== Phase I studies ===
Initial Phase I clinical trials evaluated the safety, tolerability, and pharmacokinetics of cipargamin in healthy volunteers and patients with uncomplicated P. falciparum malaria. These studies demonstrated rapid parasite clearance and established preliminary dose ranges for subsequent Phase II investigations.

=== Phase II studies ===
A randomized, dose-escalation Phase II study conducted in Sub-Saharan Africa evaluated single oral doses of cipargamin ranging from 30 to 150 mg in adults with uncomplicated P. falciparum malaria. The study demonstrated that cipargamin at doses of 50–150 mg was associated with very rapid parasite clearance and achieved PCR-corrected adequate clinical and parasitological response rates exceeding 65% at 28 days. A separate Phase II study in Thailand evaluated a 3-day regimen of 30 mg cipargamin daily, which successfully cleared parasitemia in patients infected with both P. falciparum and P. vivax.

=== Intravenous formulation development ===
Current clinical development includes evaluation of an intravenous formulation of cipargamin for the treatment of severe malaria, representing a potential alternative to injectable artesunate. This development is particularly significant given the emerging threat of artemisinin resistance in Asian countries and the need for alternative treatments for severe malaria, which primarily affects young children in Africa.

== Adverse events ==
Clinical studies have demonstrated that cipargamin is generally well-tolerated, with adverse events similar across different dose groups. The most commonly reported adverse events were malaria-related symptoms including headache, malaria recurrence/re-infection, and other treatment-related symptoms. Importantly, Phase II trials have included specific focus on hepatic safety monitoring, with one isolated case of transient ALT elevation that normalized by day 8 following treatment.

== Resistance mechanisms ==
Research has identified specific resistance mechanisms to cipargamin, primarily involving mutations in the pfatp4 gene encoding the target P-type ATPase. A clinically relevant G358S mutation in PfATP4 has been identified as conferring significant resistance to cipargamin treatment. Clinical studies have documented that recrudescent parasites frequently harbor treatment-emerging mutations, indicating the potential for resistance development under selective pressure.

== History ==
Cipargamin was discovered by screening the Novartis library of 12,000 natural products and synthetic compounds to find compounds active against Plasmodium falciparum. The first screen turned up 275 compounds and the list was narrowed to 17 potential candidates. The current spiroindolone was optimized to address its metabolic liabilities leading to improved stability and exposure levels in animals. As a result, cipargamin is one of only a handful of molecules capable of completely curing mice infected with Plasmodium berghei (a model of blood-stage malaria).
