= Horsfieldia longiflora =

Conservation status
- Vulnerable (IUCN 2.3)

Scientific classification
- Kingdom: Plantae
- Clade: Embryophytes
- Clade: Tracheophytes
- Clade: Spermatophytes
- Clade: Angiosperms
- Clade: Magnoliids
- Order: Magnoliales
- Family: Myristicaceae
- Genus: Horsfieldia
- Species: H. longiflora

Binomial name
- Horsfieldia longiflora W.J.de Wilde

Species of tree

Horsfieldia longiflora is a threatened species of plant in the family Myristicaceae. It is endemic to Vietnam. The species appears to be restricted to submontane evergreen forest.
