= Titanodula grandis =

Giant Asian mantis

Scientific classification
- Kingdom: Animalia
- Phylum: Arthropoda
- Clade: Pancrustacea
- Class: Insecta
- Order: Mantodea
- Family: Mantidae
- Genus: Titanodula
- Species: T. grandis

Binomial name
- Titanodula grandis (Saussure, 1870)

Synonyms
- Hierodula grandis Saussure, 1870

Species of praying mantis

Titanodula grandis, also known as the giant Asian mantis, is a species of praying mantis native to the region around the Bay of Bengal in southern Asia. It is found in north-eastern India, Bangladesh, and Myanmar. It is a large mantis which grows up to 4 inches long.

== Taxonomy ==
T. grandis was originally placed in Hierodula, but a 2020 study moved the species to a new genus, Titanodula, based on its large size and the unique shape of the male genitalia.
