= Elacomine =

Names
- IUPAC name (2'S,3R)-6-hydroxy-2'-(2-methylpropyl)spiro[1H-indole-3,3'-pyrrolidine]-2-one

Identifiers
CAS Number	176300-92-8
3D model (JSmol)	Interactive image
ChemSpider	9164226
PubChem CID	10989031
- InChI: InChI=1S/C15H20N2O2/c1-9(2)7-13-15(5-6-16-13)11-4-3-10(18)8-12(11)17-14(15)19/h3-4,8-9,13,16,18H,5-7H2,1-2H3,(H,17,19)/t13-,15+/m0/s1 Key: HBHCBIIRYVIJGE-DZGCQCFKSA-N
- SMILES: CC(C)C[C@H]1[C@@]2(CCN1)C3=C(C=C(C=C3)O)NC2=O

Properties
Chemical formula	C_{15}H_{20}N_{2}O_{2}
Molar mass	260.337 g·mol^{−1}
- Except where otherwise noted, data are given for materials in their standard state (at 25 °C [77 °F], 100 kPa). Infobox references

Elacomine is a natural oxindole alkaloid found in the plant species Elaeagnus commutata.

Synthethic routes for obtaining this compound have been described, based on 2-halotryptamines. Different approaches, such as regiospecific synthesis, were also mentioned.

It is a member of the spiroindolone class (specifically, a spirooxindolopyrrolizidine derivative). Horsfiline has a similar chemical structure.
