= Horsfiline =

Names
- Preferred IUPAC name (3R)-5-Methoxy-1′-methylspiro[indole-3,3′-pyrrolidin]-2(1H)-one

Identifiers
| CAS Number | 136247-72-8 |
| 3D model (JSmol) | Interactive image |
| ChemSpider | 9217785 |
| PubChem CID | 11042617 |
| UNII | 8Y5HUZ2HBF |
| CompTox Dashboard (EPA) | DTXSID40453071 |
- InChI: InChI=1S/C13H16N2O2/c1-15-6-5-13(8-15)10-7-9(17-2)3-4-11(10)14-12(13)16/h3-4,7H,5-6,8H2,1-2H3,(H,14,16)/t13-/m0/s1 Key: RVOLLKGLJIUGLG-ZDUSSCGKSA-N; InChI=1/C13H16N2O2/c1-15-6-5-13(8-15)10-7-9(17-2)3-4-11(10)14-12(13)16/h3-4,7H,5-6,8H2,1-2H3,(H,14,16)/t13-/m0/s1 Key: RVOLLKGLJIUGLG-ZDUSSCGKBT
- SMILES: O=C2Nc1c(cc(OC)cc1)[C@]23CN(C)CC3

Properties
| Chemical formula | C_{13}H_{16}N_{2}O_{2} |
| Molar mass | 232.283 g·mol^{−1} |
| Melting point | 125 to 126 °C (257 to 259 °F; 398 to 399 K) |
- Except where otherwise noted, data are given for materials in their standard state (at 25 °C [77 °F], 100 kPa). verify (what is ?) Infobox references

Horsfiline is an oxindole alkaloid found in the plant Horsfieldia superba, which is used in traditional herbal medicine. It has analgesic effects and has been the subject of research both to produce it synthetically by convenient routes and to develop analogues and derivatives which may have improved analgesic effects.

It is a member of the spiroindolone class. Elacomine has a similar chemical structure.
