= Spiroindolone =

Class of chemical compounds

Chemical structure of cipargamin, a spiroindolone being studied as an antimalarial agent

The spiroindolones are a class of compounds in which an indolone ring is substituted with another ring in a spiro arrangement.

Alkaloids in this class include horsfiline, rhynchophylline, gelsemine, carapanaubine, and maremycin E.

Spiroindolones are also an emerging class of antimalarial drugs whose mode of action is to inhibit protein synthesis in the target parasite. The most advanced compound in this class in terms of drug development is cipargamin (NITD609).
