= Otto Warburg (botanist) =

German botanist (1859–1938)

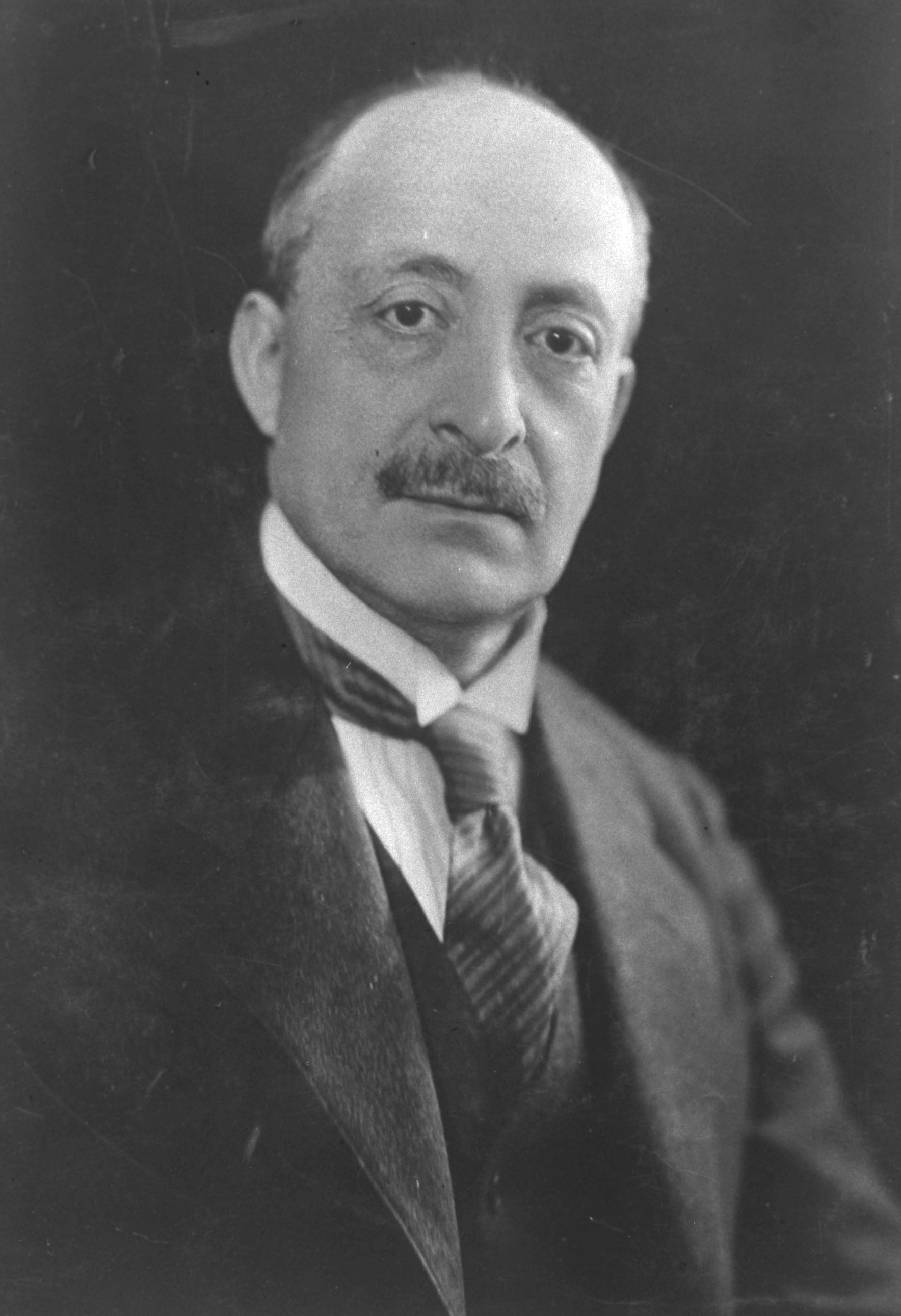
- Otto Warburg, 1911
- Born: 20 July 1859; Free and Hanseatic City of Hamburg
- Died: 10 January 1938 (aged 78); Berlin, Germany
- Occupation: Botanist
- Spouse: Anna
- Children: Edgar, Gertrud, Siegmond, Gustav
- Scientific career
- Author abbrev. (botany): Warb.

Otto Warburg (20 July 1859 – 10 January 1938) was a German-Jewish botanist. He was also a notable industrial agriculture expert and president of the Zionist Organization from 1911 to 1921.

== Biography ==
Warburg was born in Hamburg on 20 July 1859 to a family whose ancestors came to Germany in 1566, possibly from Bologna. He completed his studies at the Johanneum Gymnasium in Hamburg in 1879, and continued his education in the field of botany at the University of Bonn which he left after one semester to move to the University of Berlin, and later to the University of Strasbourg, where he received his Ph.D. in 1883. He went on to study chemistry in Munich and physiology in Tübingen with Wilhelm Pfeffer. In 1885 he embarked on a 4-year expedition to Southern and Southeastern Asia, ending in Australia in 1889.

He brought back hundreds of plant samples from his field research that he classified upon his return to Berlin after 1889. In 1897, he was appointed associate professor of Tropical Agriculture at the University of Berlin. Until 1900, he devoted himself primarily to botanical research.

Warburg's cremated remains were taken to Palestine and buried at Kibbutz Degania in 1940.

== Zionism and scientific career ==
In 1911 Warburg was elected president of the Zionist Organization. In 1920 he moved to Palestine and became founding director of the Agricultural Experimental Station in Tel Aviv. It later became the 'Institute of Agriculture and Natural History'. One of his students was Naomi Feinbrun-Dothan.

His findings were published between 1913 and 1922 in three volumes titled Die Pflanzenwelt. Upon his return to Berlin he co-founded Der Tropenpflanzer, a journal specializing in tropical agriculture, which he edited for 24 years. Realizing that as a Jew he would not be appointed full professor, he diverted his attentions to applied botanics, and founded several companies of tropical industrial plantations in Germany's colonies.

Warburg was also one of the members of the El Arish expedition, appointed by Theodor Herzl as the agricultural member of the team led by Leopold Kessler.

in 1931 he founded the National Botanic Garden of Israel in the Hebrew University in Jerusalem on Mount Scopus together with the botanist Alexander Eig. After he retired from his position in Jerusalem in 1933, Warburg moved back to Berlin and died in early 1938.

Taxa named include Dovyalis caffra, Virola peruviana, Cephalosphaera usambarensis, and the pitcher plant Nepenthes treubiana.

His son, Gustav Otto Warburg, published the book Six years of Hitler – The Jews under the Nazi regime in 1939 in London. The extent to which Jews were being persecuted in Germany through the 1930s was a hotly debated issue, with many apologists downplaying the centrality of race in Nazi ideology. This book provided counter arguments to this position. Based on official German publications and reliable external reports, it details the many methods adopted by the Nazi party against the Jews.

== Literature ==
- Suffrin, Dana von (2019-10-22), "Pflanzen für Palästina", Otto Warburg und die Naturwissenschaften im Jischuw (in German), Mohr Siebeck GmbH & Co. KG, ISBN 978-3-16-156817-6
