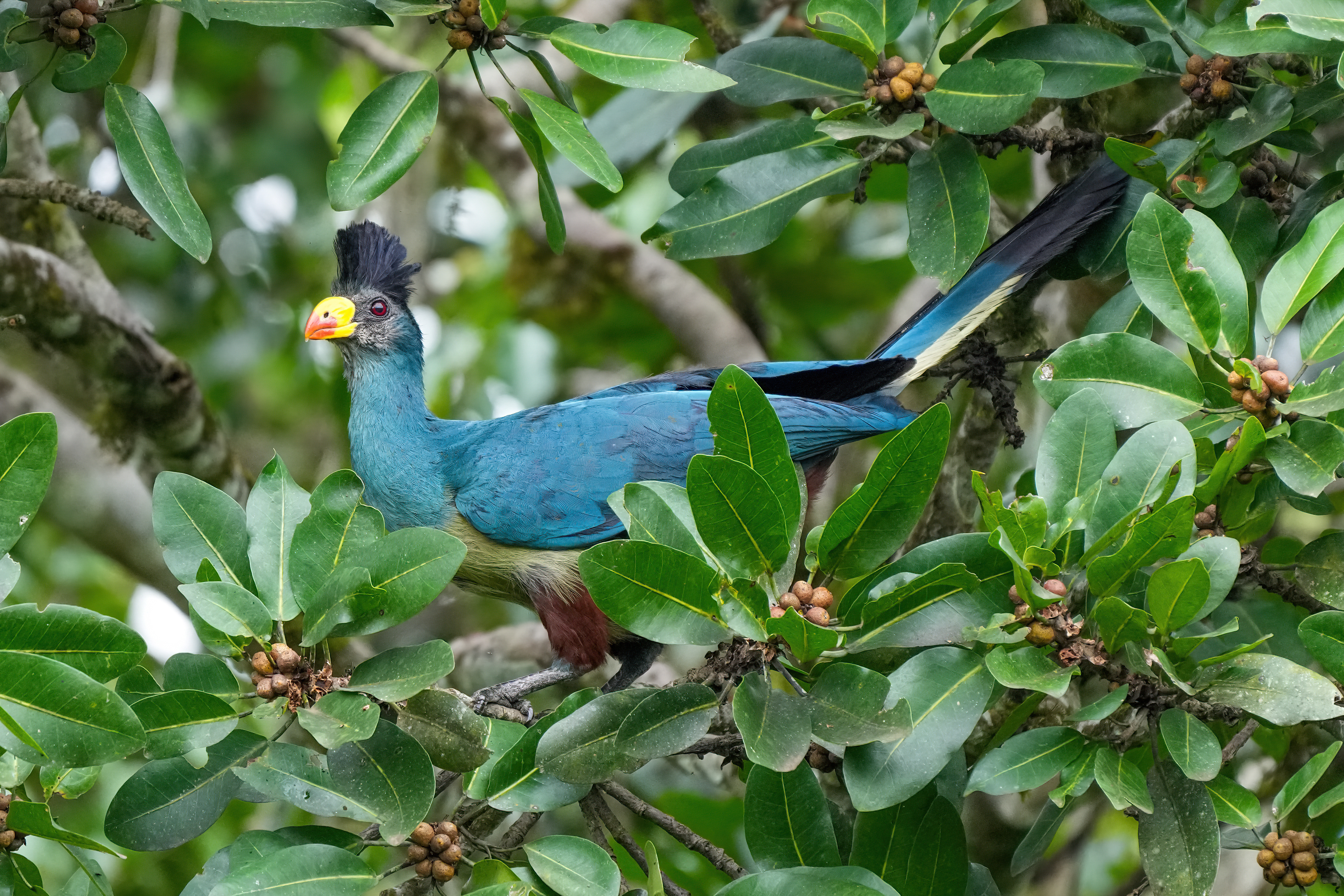
- In Kibale Forest National Park, Uganda

Conservation status
- Least Concern (IUCN 3.1)

Scientific classification
- Kingdom: Animalia
- Phylum: Chordata
- Class: Aves
- Order: Musophagiformes
- Family: Musophagidae
- Genus: Corythaeola; Heine, 1860
- Species: C. cristata

Binomial name
- Corythaeola cristata (Vieillot, 1816)

Audio
- Call recorded at Kakamega, Kenya

= Great blue turaco =

Species of bird

The great blue turaco (Corythaeola cristata) is a bird species of the family Musophagidae. At 70–76 cm (28–30 in) in length, it is the largest species of turaco. It has predominantly grey-blue plumage with an upright blue-black crest around 10 cm (3.9 in) high. The male and female have similar plumage. It is widespread throughout the African tropical rainforest.

== Taxonomy ==
French ornithologist Louis Pierre Vieillot described the great blue turaco as Musophaga cristata in 1816, before German ornithologist Ferdinand Heine placed it in its own genus in 1860.

The great blue turaco is the sole member of the subfamily Corythaeolinae within the turaco family. Its closest relatives are the go-away birds and plantain eaters of the genus Crinifer. The common ancestor of both diverged from the ancestor of all other turaco species.

"Great blue turaco" has been designated the official common name by the International Ornithologists' Union (IOC). It is also called the blue plantain eater.

== Distribution and habitat ==
The species ranges from Guinea in the west, and east across the sub-Saharan nations to the Imatong Mountains in South Sudan; it also occurs in Uganda, Rwanda, Tanzania and western Kenya, south to the Democratic Republic of Congo and Angola. It inhabits rainforests and gallery forests. It has also adapted to areas cleared by humans and can thrive in these areas.

== Description ==
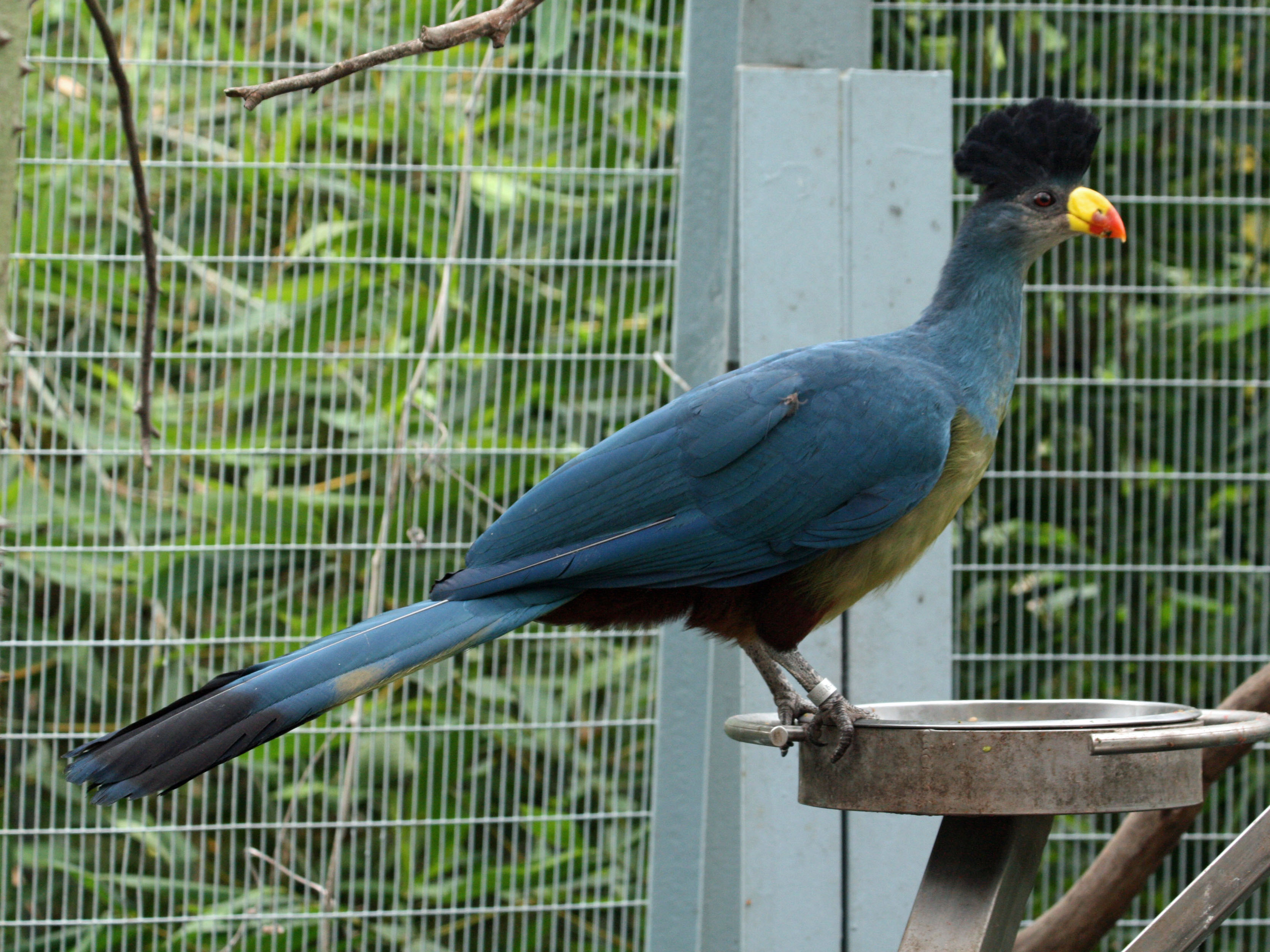
At the San Diego Zoo, California

Generally, the great blue turaco is 70–76 cm (28–30 in) in length with a mass of 800–1,231 g (1.764–2.714 lb). The adult great blue turaco has predominantly grey-blue upperparts with an upright blue-black crest, white chin, yellow-green lower breast and yellow belly darkening to chestnut brown posteriorly. The undertail coverts are chestnut, and the undertail is black and yellowish. The yellow bill has an orange-red tip, the eyes are brown, and surrounded by a ring of black bare skin. The legs and feet are black with yellow soles. The sexes have similar plumage.

== Behaviour ==
The great blue turaco is gregarious, with birds forming small troops of some six or seven individuals.

=== Feeding ===
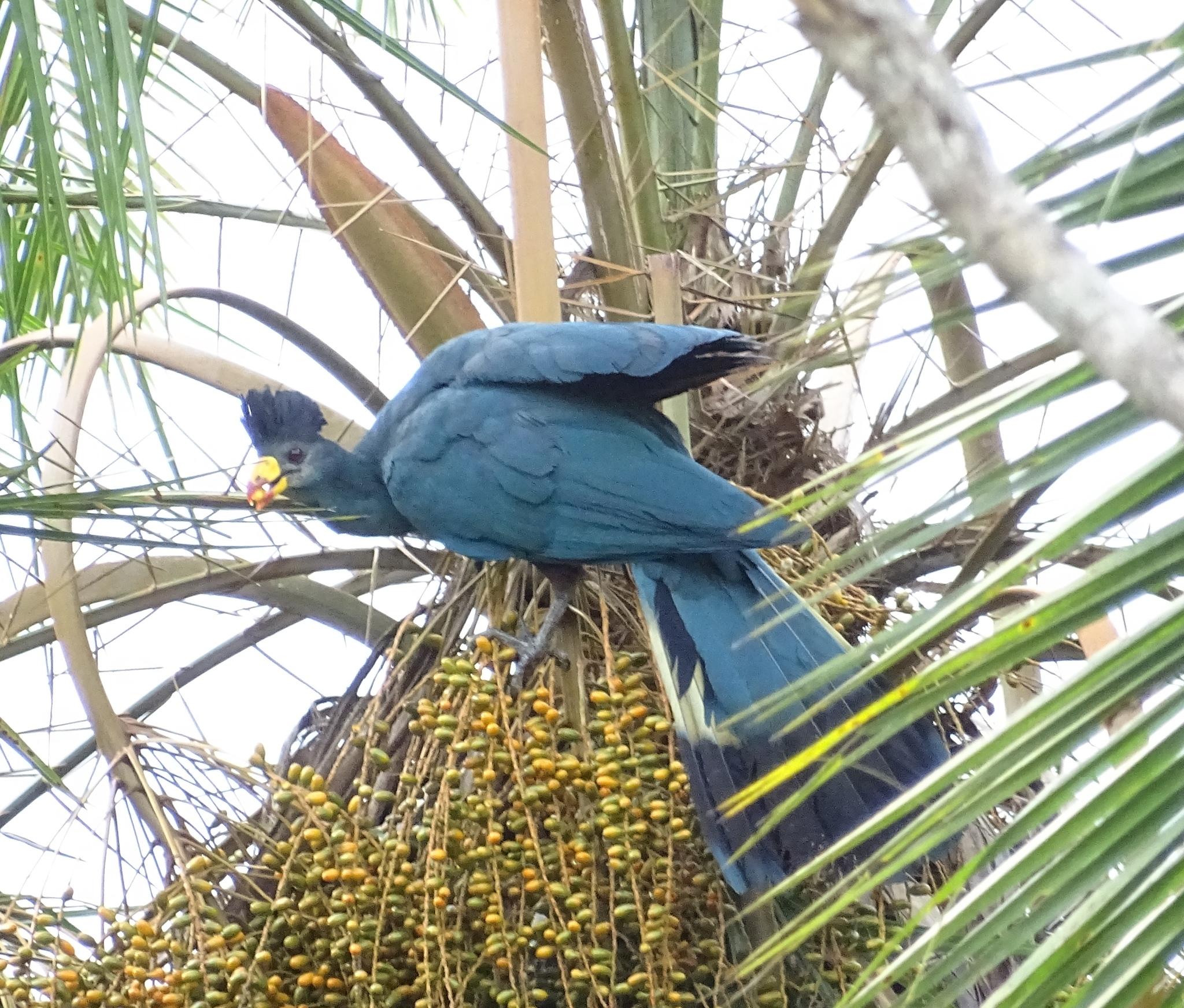
Feeding on palm fruits

The great blue turaco eats leaves, flowers, as well as fruit of many plant species, including those of the genera Musanga, Cissus, Ficus (such as Ficus capensis) Polyalthia, Heisteria, Dacryodes, Pachypodanthium, Uapaca, Strombosia, Trichilia, Drypetes, Viscum, Beilschmiedia, Coelocaryon, Croton, and Pycnanthus. In Kenya, it has been recorded eating mitzeeri (Bridelia micrantha) in April, loquat (Eriobotrya japonica) in July, guava (Psidium guajava) in September and Cordia africana over November and December. Fieldwork in Rwanda revealed leaves constituted around 25% of its diet, being eaten more often when fruit is less abundant. The species also play a role in seed dispersal as it generally passes seed in its faeces some distance from parent trees.

=== Breeding ===
The species nests in trees between 8 and 25 metres (26 and 82 ft) above the ground, and the nest is a platform of sticks. Both sexes incubate the clutch of two (rarely one or three) eggs over 29–31 days. The eggs are white or greenish-white and almost round, measuring 46–50 mm by 41–43 mm (1.8–2.0 in by 1.6–1.7 in).

== Interactions with humans ==
Highly regarded as food in West Africa, it is often hunted and eaten by local people. The BaMbala and related tribes around the town of Kikwit in the DRC, call the great blue turaco kolonvo. The meat is popular in smaller villages, and the long tail feathers are prized for decorations. The Mbuti people of the Ituri Rainforest in the Democratic Republic of the Congo consider the great blue turaco (which they call kulkoko) to be associated with okapis, which they would warn of danger by calling loudly. They also believe that eating the species while pregnant may result in a difficult delivery or birth deformity. It is also a clan totem animal and as such, cannot be eaten by members of that clan; if they do eat it their teeth are said to fall out.

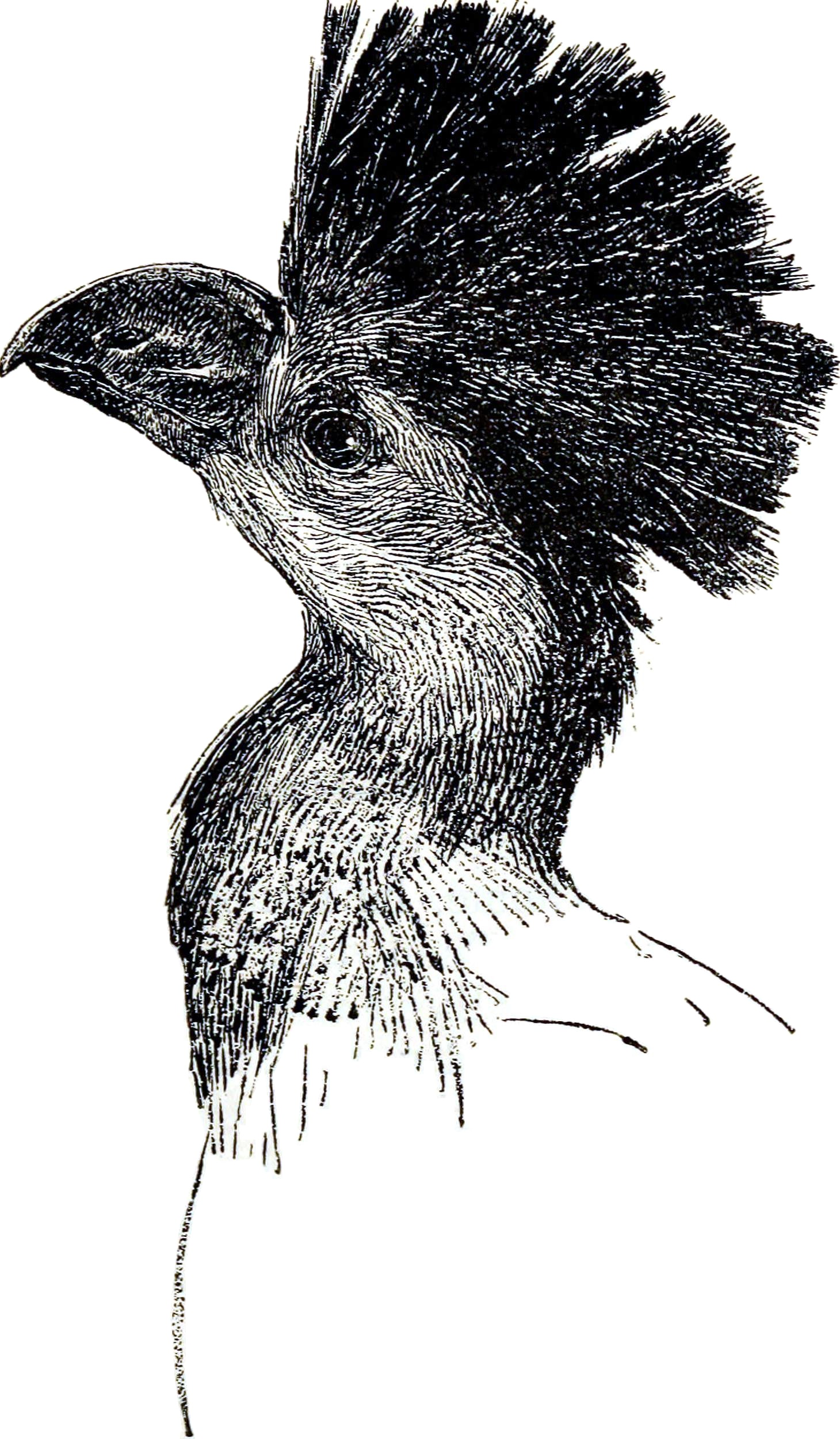
Illustration in H. H. Johnston (1895)

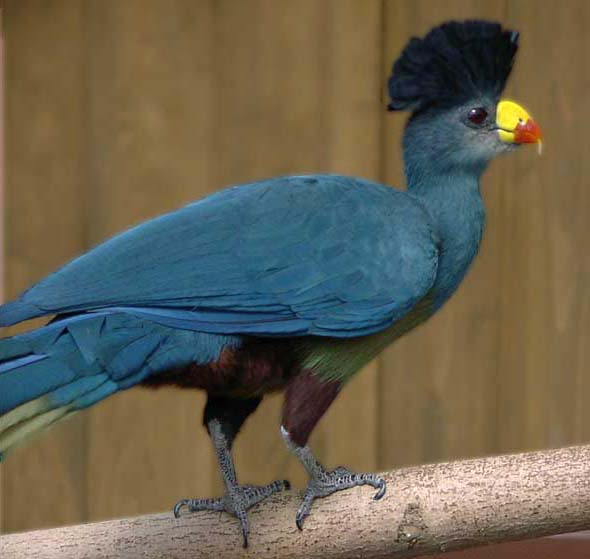
Captive specimen

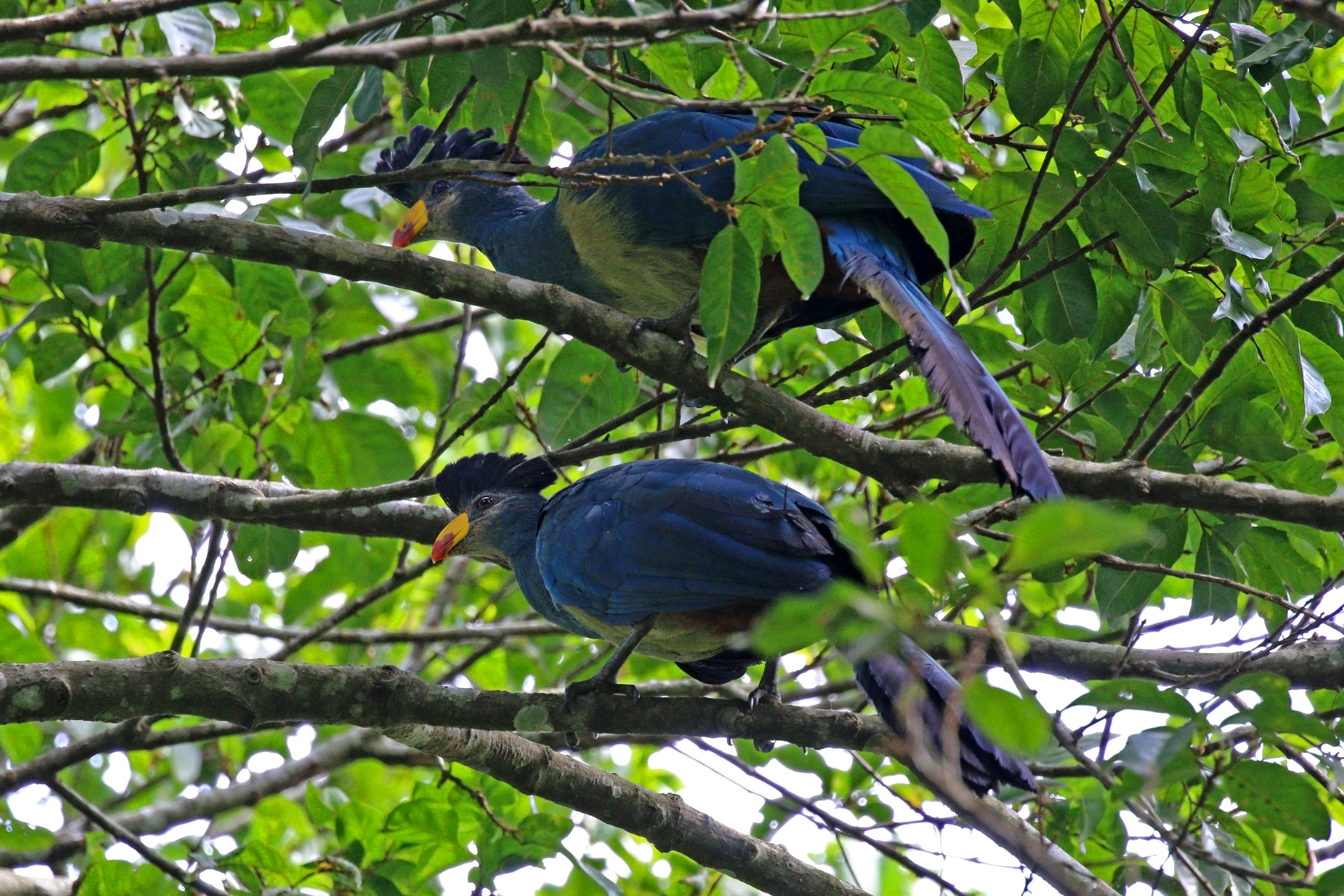
A pair at Kibale Forest, Uganda

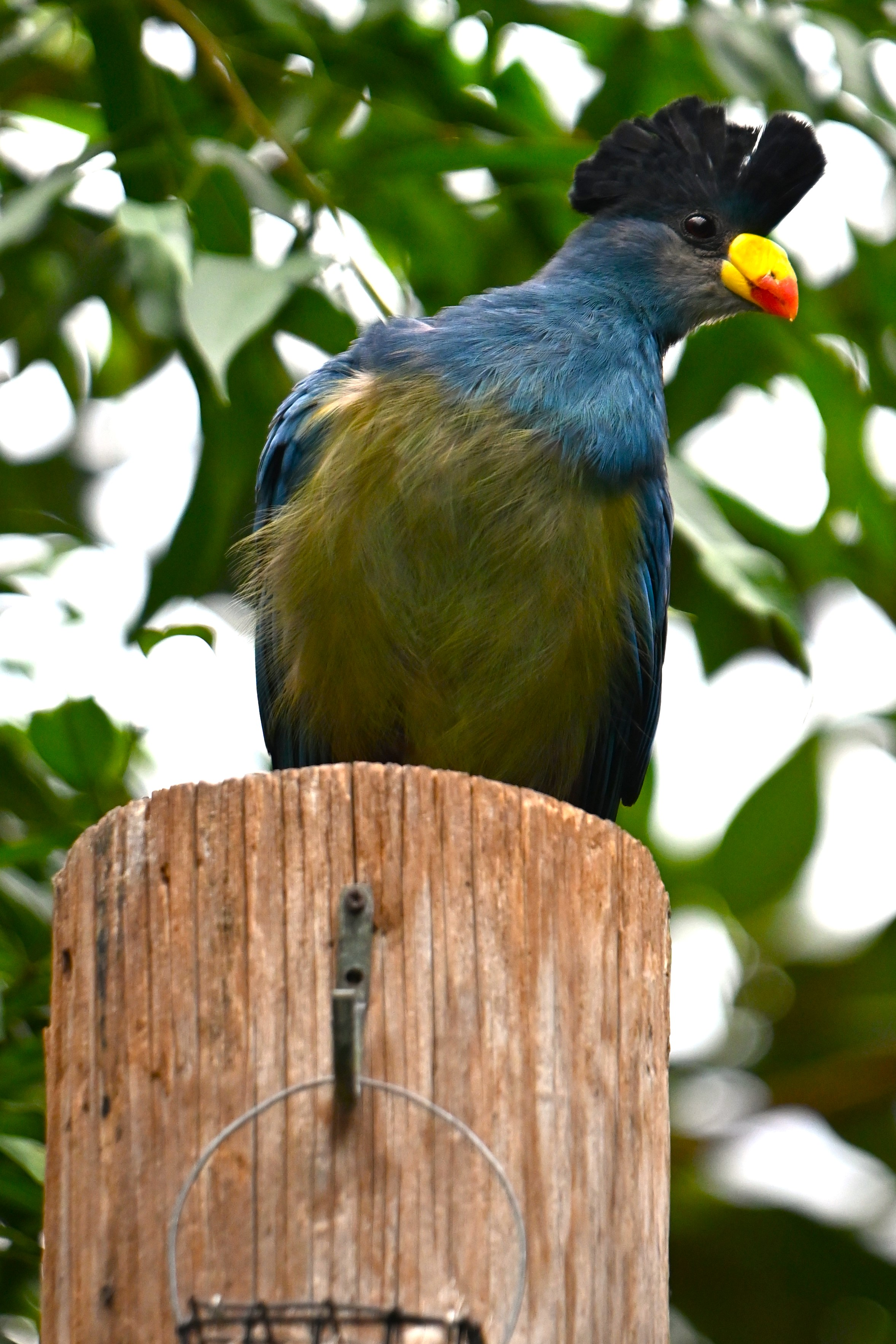
Captive specimen at Sedgwick County Zoo, Kansas

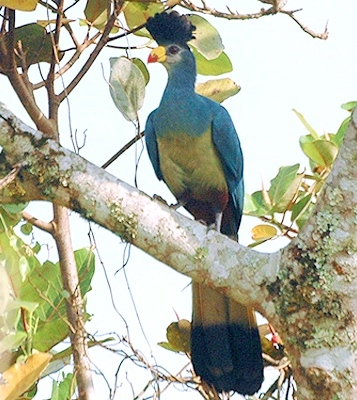
In Uganda
