= Endocomia macrocoma =

Conservation status
- Least Concern (IUCN 3.1)

Scientific classification
- Kingdom: Plantae
- Clade: Embryophytes
- Clade: Tracheophytes
- Clade: Spermatophytes
- Clade: Angiosperms
- Clade: Magnoliids
- Order: Magnoliales
- Family: Myristicaceae
- Genus: Endocomia
- Species: E. macrocoma

Binomial name
- Endocomia macrocoma (Miq.) W.J.de Wilde

Subspecies
- Endocomia macrocoma subsp. longipes W.J.de Wilde; Endocomia macrocoma subsp. macrocoma; Endocomia macrocoma subsp. prainii (King) W.J.de Wilde

Synonyms
- Synonymy: Horsfieldia macrocoma (Miq.) Warb.; Myristica macrocoma Miq. synonyms of subsp. macrocoma: Gymnacranthera ibutii Holthuis; Horsfieldia leptocarpa Warb.; Myristica leptocarpa (Warb.) Boerl. synonyms of subsp. prainii: Horsfieldia longipedunculata H.H.Hu; Horsfieldia merrillii Warb.; Horsfieldia oblongata Merr.; Horsfieldia pandurifolia H.H.Hu; Horsfieldia papillosa Warb.; Horsfieldia prainii (King) Warb.; Horsfieldia trifida A.C.Sm.; Myristica amygdalina var. hookeri A.DC.; Myristica exaltata Wall. ex King; Myristica papillosa (Warb.) Boerl.; Myristica prainii King

Species of flowering plant

Endocomia macrocoma is a species of flowering plant in the family Myristicaceae. It is a tree native to south-central China, northeastern India, Bangladesh, Indochina, Malesia, and New Guinea.

Three subspecies are accepted:

- Endocomia macrocoma subsp. longipes W.J.de Wilde – Borneo and eastern Sumatra
- Endocomia macrocoma subsp. macrocoma – northern Sulawesi and the Maluku Islands. The subspecies is assessed by the IUCN Red List as Least Concern.
- Endocomia macrocoma subsp. prainii (King) W.J.de Wilde – Tripura, Bangladesh, south-central China, Myanmar, Laos, Thailand, Peninsular Malaysia, Sumatra, Java, the Philippines, and New Guinea. The IUCN Red List assesses the subspecies (as synonym Horsfieldia pandurifolia) as Endangered.
