= Endocomia =

Scientific classification
- Kingdom: Plantae
- Clade: Embryophytes
- Clade: Tracheophytes
- Clade: Spermatophytes
- Clade: Angiosperms
- Clade: Magnoliids
- Order: Magnoliales
- Family: Myristicaceae
- Genus: Endocomia; W.J.de Wilde

Genus of flowering plants

Endocomia is a genus of flowering trees in the family Myristicaceae with a distribution ranging from Indochina to New Guinea. It is distinguished from the other Asian genera by its monoecious inflorescences which are unique in the mostly dioecious Myristicaceae. The only other place where monoecy is reported in the family is in a few Iryanthera species in South America.

== Species ==
According to Kew's Plants of the World Online, there are four accepted species:

- Endocomia canarioides (King) W.J.de Wilde
- Endocomia macrocoma (Miq.) W.J.de Wilde
- Endocomia rufirachis (Sinclair) W.J.de Wilde
- Endocomia virella W.J.de Wilde
