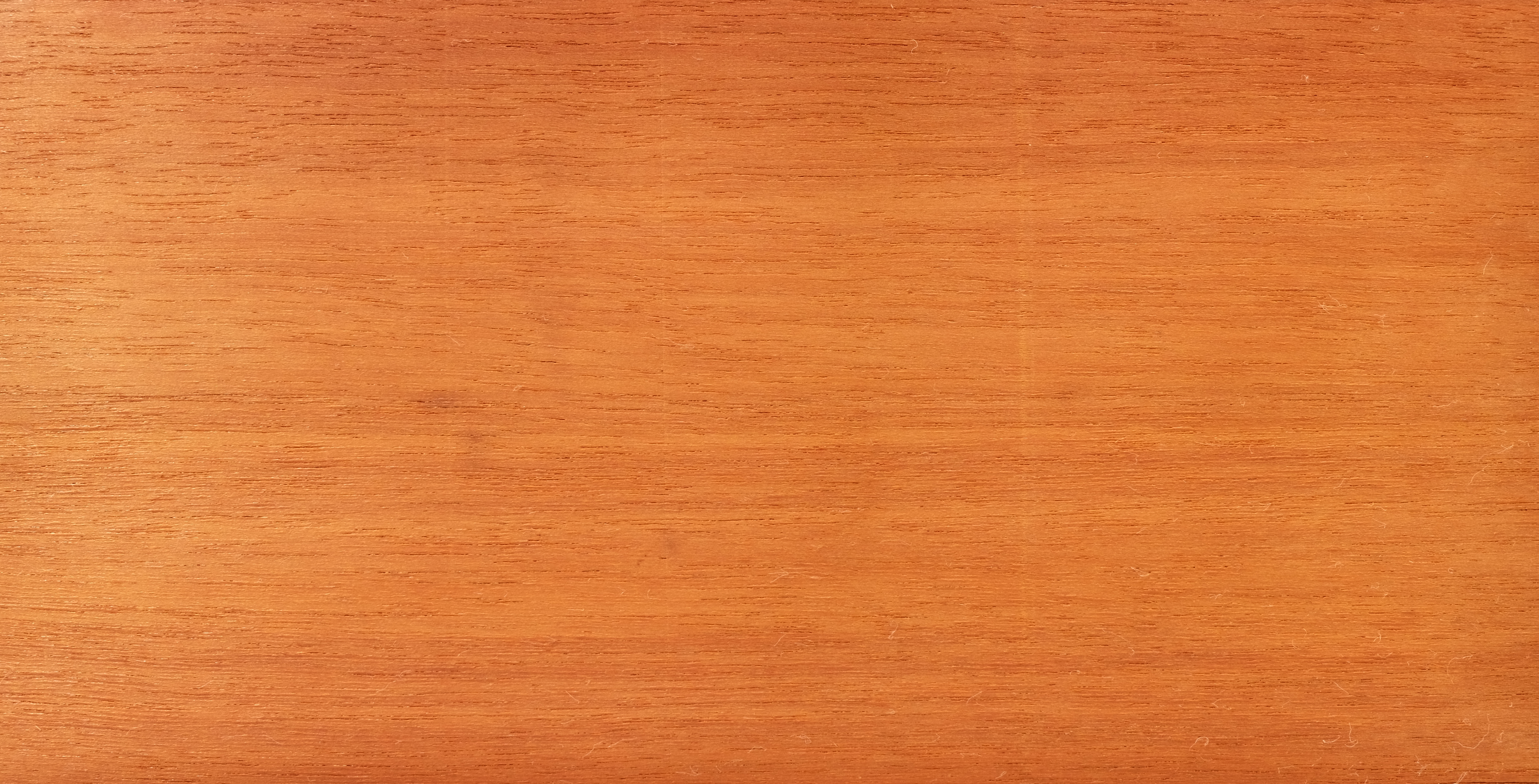
- timber, known as Niove

Conservation status
- Least Concern (IUCN 3.1)

Scientific classification
- Kingdom: Plantae
- Clade: Embryophytes
- Clade: Tracheophytes
- Clade: Spermatophytes
- Clade: Angiosperms
- Clade: Magnoliids
- Order: Magnoliales
- Family: Myristicaceae
- Genus: Staudtia
- Species: S. kamerunensis

Binomial name
- Staudtia kamerunensis Warb.

Varieties
- Staudtia kamerunensis var. gabonensis (Warb.) Fouilloy; Staudtia kamerunensis var. kamerunensis

Synonyms
- synonyms of var. gabonensis: Staudtia congensis Vermoesen; Staudtia gabonensis Warb.; Staudtia stipitata Warb.; Uvaria busgenii A.Unwin; synonyms of var. kamerunensis: Staudtia gabonensis var. macrocarpa M.G.Gilbert & Troupin

= Staudtia kamerunensis =

Species of flowering plant

Staudtia kamerunensis is a species flowering plant in the family Myristicaceae. It is a tree native to central Africa, ranging from Nigeria to the Central African Republic, Uganda, Zambia, and Angola. It is commonly known as Bokapi, M'bonda (Cameroon), Niove, M'boun (Gabon), Kamashi or Nkafi (Zaire) It produces red brown to yellow brown wood with a fine grain.

Two varieties are accepted:

- Staudtia kamerunensis var. gabonensis (Warb.) Fouilloy – Angola, Burundi, Cabinda, Cameroon, Central African Republic, Republic of the Congo, Democratic Republic of the Congo, Gabon, Gulf of Guinea Islands, Nigeria, Uganda, and Zambia.
- Staudtia kamerunensis var. kamerunensis – Bioko, Cameroon, Gabon, and Democratic Republic of the Congo

The species was described by Otto Warburg in 1897.
