= Doyleanthus =

Conservation status
- Endangered (IUCN 3.1)

Scientific classification
- Kingdom: Plantae
- Clade: Embryophytes
- Clade: Tracheophytes
- Clade: Spermatophytes
- Clade: Angiosperms
- Clade: Magnoliids
- Order: Magnoliales
- Family: Myristicaceae
- Genus: Doyleanthus; Sauquet
- Species: D. arillata

Binomial name
- Doyleanthus arillata Capuron ex Sauquet

Genus of plants

Doyleanthus is a monotypic genus of flowering plants belonging to the family Myristicaceae. The only species is Doyleanthus arillata.

Its native range is Madagascar.

== Description ==
Similar in form to Mauloutchia in all vegetative and inflorescence characters, but unambiguously different in its monocyclic androecium (multiple stamens) with 3–4 strictly sessile anthers. It has a fully developed, deeply laciniate aril (seed coating), a condition otherwise found only in Madagascar in Mauloutchia heckelii, from which Doyleanthus may easily be distinguished by its unclustered, pedicellate flowers as well as its androecium characters.

== Taxonomy ==
French botanist René Capuron (1921 – 1971) first collected and described the plant (and placed it in the Mauloutchia family) and it was published after his early death in 'Contribution à l'étude de la flore forestière de Madagascar' – A. Haematodendron, genre nouveau de Myristicaceae. Adansonia, Série 2 Vol.12 on pages 375–379 in 1972. Later, another French botanist Hervé Sauquet, revised the plants found in Madagascar, and using phylogenetic analysis and he made a new genus. The genus of Doyleanthus is in honour of James A. Doyle (born 1943), American botanist and palaeontologist at the University of California, Davis. It was then published in Amer. J. Bot. Vol. 90 on page 1304 in 2003.
