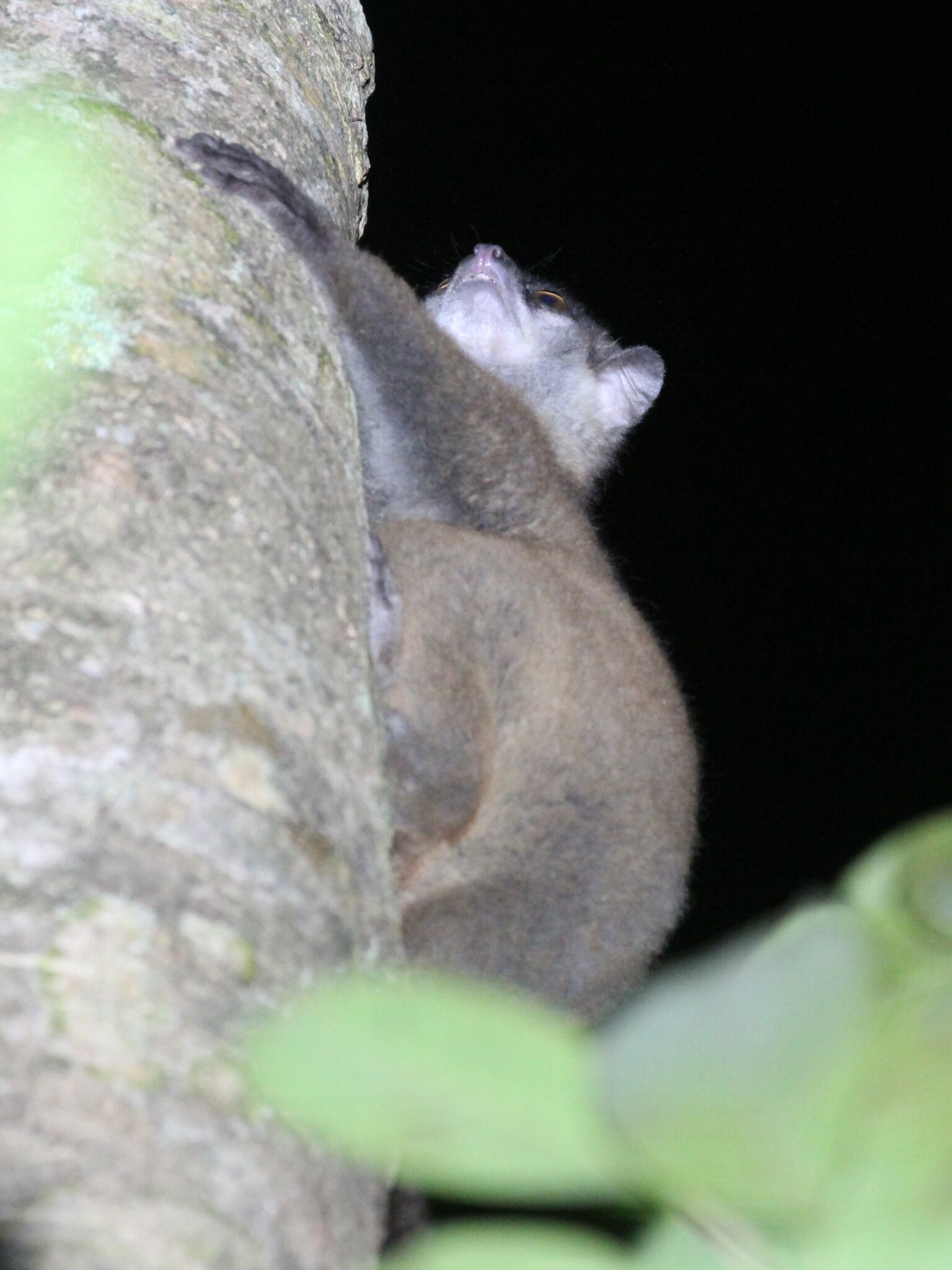

Conservation status
- Endangered (IUCN 3.1)
- CITES Appendix I

Scientific classification
- Kingdom: Animalia
- Phylum: Chordata
- Class: Mammalia
- Order: Primates
- Suborder: Strepsirrhini
- Family: Lepilemuridae
- Genus: Lepilemur
- Species: L. fleuretae

Binomial name
- Lepilemur fleuretae Louis et al.., 2006
- Distribution of L. fleuretae

= Fleurette's sportive lemur =

Species of lemur

Fleurette's sportive lemur (Lepilemur fleuretae), or the Andohahela sportive lemur, is a sportive lemur endemic to Madagascar. Like all members of its genus, it is nocturnal, and largely folivorous. It is threatened by habitat loss and hunting.

== Taxonomy and phylogenetics ==
Fleurette's sportive lemur was described in 2006 based on genetic samples and morphometrics collected in 2004. The specific epithet fleuretae honors Fleurette Andriantsilavo, who was Secretary General of the Ministry of Environment, Water and Forestry in Madagascar. Genetic analyses show Fleurette's sportive lemur to be an outgroup to a clade of eastern Lepilemur containing the Betsileo sportive lemur, James' sportive lemur and the weasel sportive lemur.

== Description ==
Fleurette's sportive lemur is predominantly gray on the back and brownish-gray on the belly. The upper parts of the limbs are grayish-brown and the fur on the sides of the belly is light brown. The fur covering the eyelids is noticeably lighter than the rest of the face. A diffuse stripe runs along the midline of the back, starting from the forehead and continuing approximately halfway down the back. The tail is reddish-gray closer to the body, transitioning to darker gray towards the tip.

Fleurette's sportive lemur is medium-sized for its genus. The head-body length is 24–26 cm (9.4–10.2 in) and the tail length is 27–30 cm (11–12 in), adding up to a total length of 51–56 cm (20–22 in). It weighs 800–980 g (28–35 oz).

== Distribution and habitat ==
Fleurette's sportive lemur is found in extreme southeastern Madagascar, where it is known from Andohahela National Park, Tsitongambarika Protected Area, and some surrounding forest patches. It is not present in nearby littoral forests or the Beampingaratsy Protected Area north of Andohahela National Park. The exact limits of its range are yet to be determined. The species' estimated extent of occurrence is 2,532 km^{2} (978 sq mi).

Within its range, Fleurette's sportive lemur inhabits lowland rainforests. 65% of the species' diet consists of leaves, and the remaining 35% consists of fruit and flowers. The most important plant species included in the diet are Albizia species, Neobrochoneura acuminata, Cynometra species, and Uapaca thouarsii.

Fleurette's sportive lemur's home ranges are 2.59–5.28 ha (6.4–13.0 acres) for females and 7.85–7.89 ha (19.4–19.5 acres) for males. The species is suspected to have a polygynous, dispersed social system. Additionally, it is strictly nocturnal and solitary.

== Threats and conservation ==
As of 2020, Fleurette's sportive lemur has been listed as Endangered (EN) on the IUCN Red List. Its main threat is habitat loss, although hunting may also be a threat due to its apparent lack of fear towards humans. Illegal drug production, mostly marijuana, has been occurring in the species' range. It was not being held in captivity as of 2022.
