= Iryanthera obovata =

Conservation status
- Least Concern (IUCN 3.1)

Scientific classification
- Kingdom: Plantae
- Clade: Tracheophytes
- Clade: Angiosperms
- Clade: Magnoliids
- Order: Magnoliales
- Family: Myristicaceae
- Genus: Iryanthera
- Species: I. obovata

Binomial name
- Iryanthera obovata Ducke

Species of flowering plant

Iryanthera obovata is a species of flowering plant in the family Myristicaceae. It is a tree native to northern Brazil, southeastern Colombia, and southern Venezuela. It grows in lowland Amazon rainforest up to 700 metres elevation.

The species was described by Adolpho Ducke in 1936.
