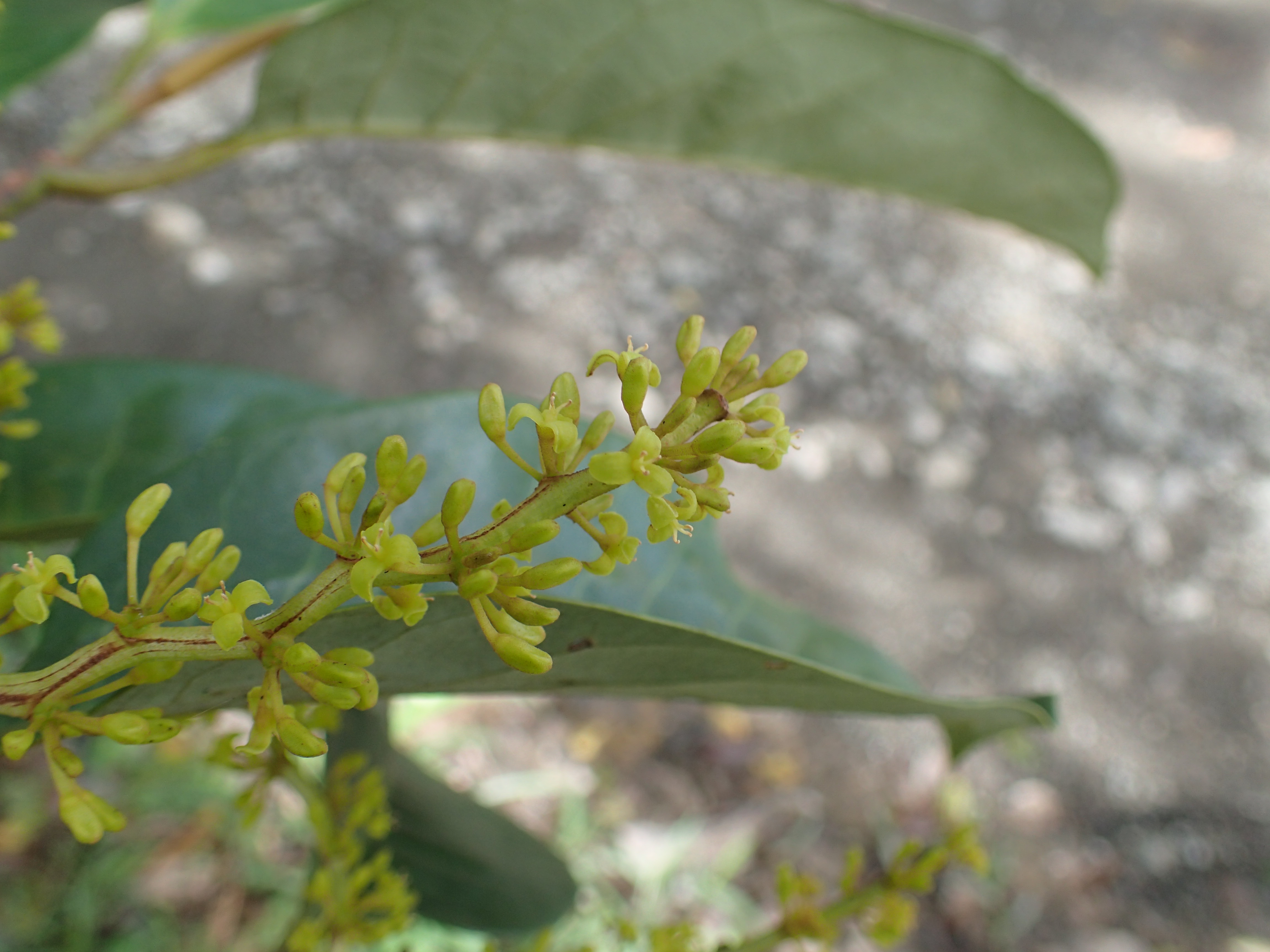

Conservation status
- Least Concern (IUCN 3.1)

Scientific classification
- Kingdom: Plantae
- Clade: Embryophytes
- Clade: Tracheophytes
- Clade: Angiosperms
- Clade: Magnoliids
- Order: Magnoliales
- Family: Myristicaceae
- Genus: Otoba
- Species: O. novogranatensis

Binomial name
- Otoba novogranatensis Moldenke

Synonyms
- Dialyanthera otoba (Bonpl.) Warb.; Myristica cumaru Poepp. ex Meisn.; Myristica otoba Bonpl.; Otoba otoba (Bonpl.) H.Karst.; Palala otoba (Bonpl.) Kuntze

= Otoba novogranatensis =

Species of tree

Otoba novogranatensis is a species of tree which ranges from southern Nicaragua to northwestern Venezuela and Ecuador. It grows in lowland to submontane rain forests up to 1300 m asl. It can reach heights of up to 30 m tall with a bole of 45 cm in diameter and has low buttresses.

== Etymology ==
The specific epithet novogranatensis is a demonym for Colombia, formerly called Nueva Granada.
