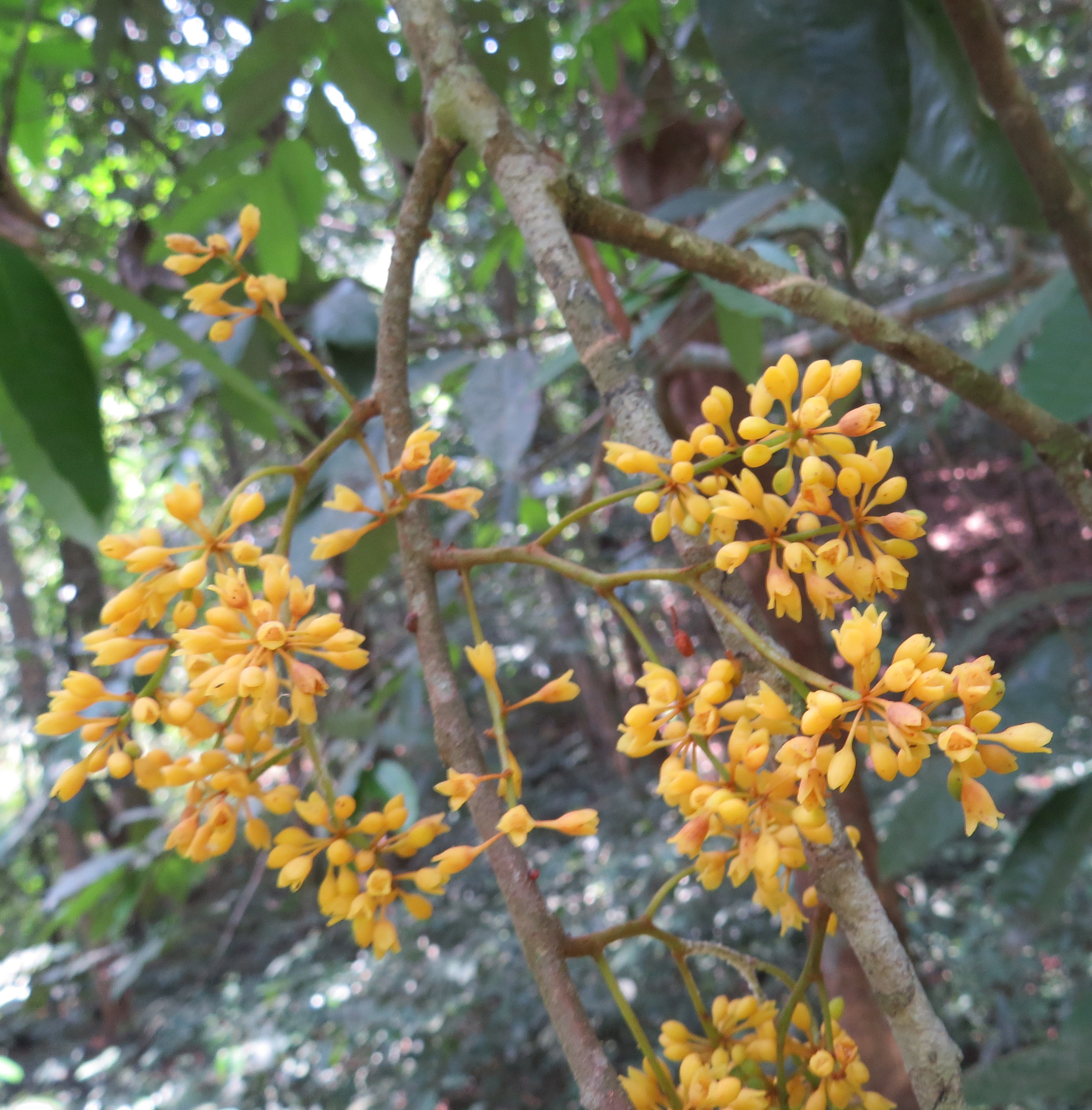
- Flowers

Conservation status
- Vulnerable (IUCN 2.3)

Scientific classification
- Kingdom: Plantae
- Clade: Embryophytes
- Clade: Tracheophytes
- Clade: Spermatophytes
- Clade: Angiosperms
- Clade: Magnoliids
- Order: Magnoliales
- Family: Myristicaceae
- Genus: Gymnacranthera
- Species: G. canarica

Binomial name
- Gymnacranthera canarica (Bedd. ex King) Warb.

Synonyms
- Myristica canarica Bedd. ex King

= Gymnacranthera canarica =

Species of flowering plant

Gymnacranthera canarica is a species of flowering plant in the family Myristicaceae endemic to India. This tree is also known by local names Undappayin in Kerala and Hedehagalu in Karnataka.

== Description ==
This tree grows up to 30 meters. It is dioecious thus having separate male and female flowers.

== Range and habitat ==
This species is restricted to the states of Karnataka and Kerala in southern India. It grows in lowland rain forests, including swamp forests.

== Ecology and usage ==
The tree flowers during March and April.

== Conservation and threats ==
Major threats faced by this species include specific swampy habitat, collection of seeds for medicinal and commercial purposes, poor seed regeneration, climate change, habitat loss due to anthropogenic activities.

The seeds of this plant are considered recalcitrant. The seeds did not germinate past two months. Under controlled conditions in lab the seeds lasted for two and half months. The seeds further had chemicals that get washed away in its naturally occurring swamp habitats helping better germination. This leads to poor regeneration of this tree outside swamp habitats in the wild especially where there is a pressure of habitat destruction. Some studies found that partial removal of seed cover and treatment of seeds can improve the seed germination.
