= Pycnanthus dinklagei =

Scientific classification
- Kingdom: Plantae
- Clade: Embryophytes
- Clade: Tracheophytes
- Clade: Angiosperms
- Clade: Magnoliids
- Order: Magnoliales
- Family: Myristicaceae
- Genus: Pycnanthus
- Species: P. dinklagei

Binomial name
- Pycnanthus dinklagei Warb.

Species of flowering plant

Pycnanthus dinklagei is a plant in the Myristicaceae family. It is native to Ivory Coast, Liberia, and Sierra Leone.
