= Gymnacranthera maliliensis =

Conservation status
- Near Threatened (IUCN 2.3)

Scientific classification
- Kingdom: Plantae
- Clade: Tracheophytes
- Clade: Angiosperms
- Clade: Magnoliids
- Order: Magnoliales
- Family: Myristicaceae
- Genus: Gymnacranthera
- Species: G. maliliensis

Binomial name
- Gymnacranthera maliliensis Schouten

Species of tree

Gymnacranthera maliliensis is a species of plant in the family Myristicaceae. It is endemic to Sulawesi in Indonesia.
