= Iryanthera campinae =

Conservation status
- Endangered (IUCN 2.3)

Scientific classification
- Kingdom: Plantae
- Clade: Embryophytes
- Clade: Tracheophytes
- Clade: Spermatophytes
- Clade: Angiosperms
- Clade: Magnoliids
- Order: Magnoliales
- Family: Myristicaceae
- Genus: Iryanthera
- Species: I. campinae

Binomial name
- Iryanthera campinae W.A.Rodrigues

Species of flowering plant

Iryanthera campinae is a species of flowering plant in the family Myristicaceae. It is a shrub or tree endemic to Roraima state of northern Brazil.
