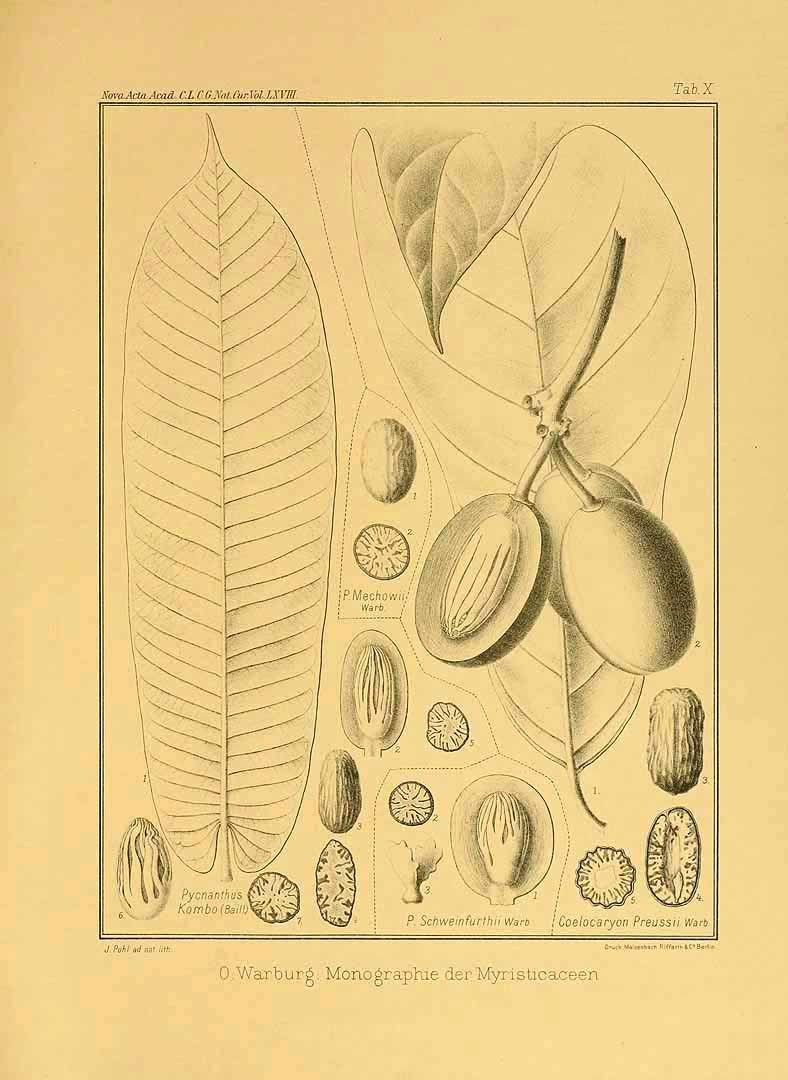

Conservation status
- Least Concern (IUCN 3.1)

Scientific classification
- Kingdom: Plantae
- Clade: Embryophytes
- Clade: Tracheophytes
- Clade: Spermatophytes
- Clade: Angiosperms
- Clade: Magnoliids
- Order: Magnoliales
- Family: Myristicaceae
- Genus: Pycnanthus
- Species: P. angolensis

Binomial name
- Pycnanthus angolensis (Welw.) Warb.

Subspecies
- Pycnanthus angolensis subsp. angolensis; Pycnanthus angolensis subsp. schweinfurthii (Warb.) Verdc.

Synonyms
- Synonymy: Myristica angolensis Welw. synonyms of subsp. angolensis: Myristica kombo Baill.; Myristica miohu Baill. ex Laness., nom. nud.; Myristica niohne Baill. ex Laness., orth. var.; Myristica niohue Baill.; Pycnanthus angolensis var. angolensis (Warb.) M.G.Gilbert & Troup; Pycnanthus kombo (Baill.) Warb.; Pycnanthus kombo var. angolensis Warb.; Pycnanthus mechowii Warb.; Pycnanthus niohue (Baill.) Warb.; Pycnanthus togoensis Warb., nom. nud.; Scyphocephalium kombo (Baill.) Warb. synonyms of subsp. schweinfurthii: Pycnanthus schweinfurthii Warb.; Pycnanthus kombo var. sphaerocarpus Stapf

= Pycnanthus angolensis =

Species of tree

Pycnanthus angolensis is a species of tree in the nutmeg family, Myristicaceae. It is native to tropical Africa. Its English language common names include African nutmeg, false nutmeg, boxboard, and cardboard. In Africa it is widely known as ilomba.

== Description ==
This evergreen tree grows up to 40 meters tall and usually up to a meter wide, sometimes up to 1.5 meters or more. The trunk is straight and cylindrical with fissures and flaking bark. The sap is honey-colored and turns red in time. The branches are in whorls. The leathery leaves are up to 31 centimeters long by 9 wide. The blades have pointed tips, heart-shaped bases, and thick midribs. They are hairless on top and coated with rusty, feltlike hairs on the undersides. The leaves usually bear signs of insect damage, a feature so common it is considered characteristic of the species. The flowers are arranged in dense, rusty panicles up to 15 centimeters long. The individual flowers are difficult to see in the tight panicle until the stamens develop, being only about a millimeter long. The flowers are hairy and fragrant. The fruit is a rounded drupe reaching over 3 centimeters long and wide, borne in clusters. It is hairy brown when new, turning yellow-orange, and has cartilaginous flesh that dries woody. It contains a black seed with a red aril which resembles that of nutmeg. The fruit ripens over a long period continuing into the next flowering season, which begins around October.

== Subspecies ==
Two subspecies are accepted.

- Pycnanthus angolensis subsp. angolensis – Senegal to Central African Republic, Rwanda, and Angola
- Pycnanthus angolensis subsp. schweinfurthii (Warb.) Verdc. – South Sudan, Democratic Republic of the Congo, Uganda, Burundi, Tanzania, and northern Zambia

== Ecology ==
The tree grows in moist rainforests up to about 1200 meters in elevation among other evergreens and semideciduous trees. It occurs in secondary forest, sometimes taking hold in new canopy gaps or clearings. It thrives in sunny locations. It grows in riparian forests such as gallery forests, and in some regions it can be found in swamps. It occurs in areas receiving between about 1300 and 1800 millimeters of rain per year, but the optimal seems to be about 2000 millimeters.

Many animals feed on the fruits, such as hornbills.

== Uses ==
This species has a wide variety of human uses. It is harvested for its wood, which is light, soft, and whitish gray or pink-tinged in color. Its popularity rose after World War II when plywood was in demand, and during the mid-20th century it was one of the more valuable timbers in Central Africa. It is not very durable and tends to warp, but it is easy to cut and work and can be used for many purposes. It is suitable for furniture, and in house construction as panelling, siding, roof shingles, and framing. It is used for fuel and paper pulp. The wood can be vulnerable to termites, powderpost beetles, and other pests.

The yellowish or reddish fat from the aromatic seed is called "kombo butter" or "Angola tallow". A seed can be up to 70% fat. It is used as a fuel for lighting and is made into soap. Seed remnants are used in compost. When ignited, the oily seed burns slowly and can be used as a candle.

In Uganda the tree is grown in banana, coffee, and cocoa plantations to shade the crops.

Most parts of the tree have been used in traditional African medicine. The sap has been used to control bleeding. The bark has been used as a poison antidote and a treatment for leprosy, anemia, infertility, gonorrhea, and malaria. Leaf extracts are consumed or used in an enema to treat edema. Root extracts are used to treat parasitic infections, such as schistosomiasis. The seed oil is used to treat thrush.

Like the fat of nutmeg, kombo butter is mostly myristic acid, with a high amount of myristoleic acid, as well. It contains the unique compound kombic acid, which was named for the tree under its nomenclatural synonym, P. kombo.

== Cultivation ==
This tree is cultivated for its products. Seeds are sown in the field, and seedlings are grown in plant nurseries until they have large taproots. They cannot tolerate drought. After a year the tree is about half a meter tall, and within 4 years it can reach 4 meters. A 20-year-old tree can be 25 meters tall. Stands of cultivated trees are pruned and thinned periodically.

Pest insects such as Monochamus scabiosus and Mallodon downesi and fungi such as Ophiostoma sp. have been observed, but they are not severe problems. The freshly harvested wood may become discolored due to bacterial growth, the light-colored wood developing dark brown staining.

Trees can be cut when they reach a diameter of 50 centimeters, at around 30 years old.

Agricultural cooperatives in Ghana cultivate the trees for the kombo butter.

== Common names ==
There are common names for the plant in many languages. It is called mkungu mwitu in Swahili, akwa-mili and oje in Igbo, lunaba and munaba in Luganda, akomu in Yoruba, calabo in Spanish, and arbre à suif and faux muscadier in French. Local names include pó casson in São Tomé and Príncipe, gboyei in Sierra Leone and Liberia, otie in Ghana, eteng in Cameroon, lolako in Zaire, and adria, effoi, hétéré, qualélé, and walélé in Ivory Coast.
