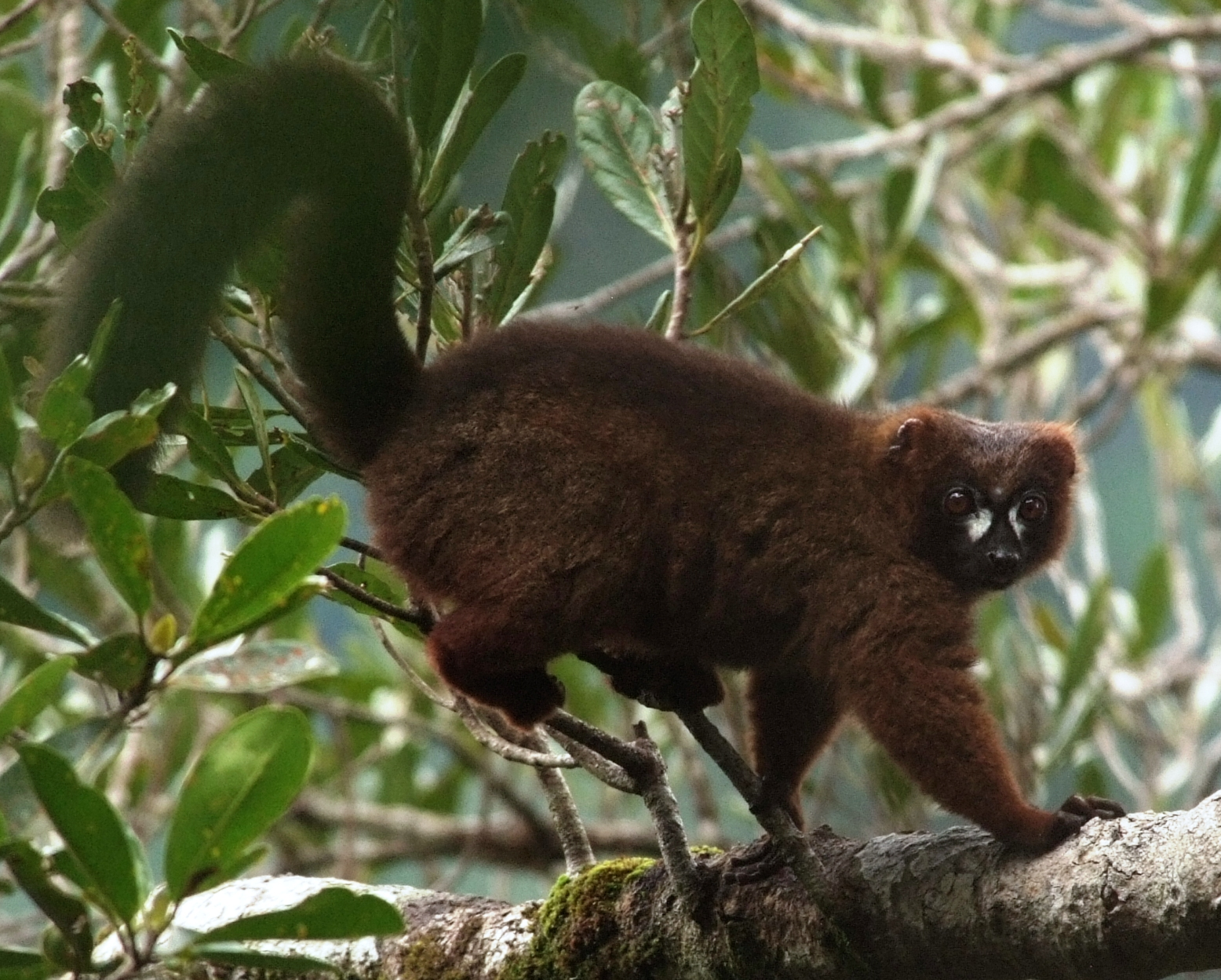

Conservation status
- Vulnerable (IUCN 3.1)
- CITES Appendix I

Scientific classification
- Kingdom: Animalia
- Phylum: Chordata
- Class: Mammalia
- Infraclass: Placentalia
- Order: Primates
- Suborder: Strepsirrhini
- Family: Lemuridae
- Genus: Eulemur
- Species: E. rubriventer

Binomial name
- Eulemur rubriventer I. Geoffroy, 1850
- Distribution of E. rubriventer

Synonyms
- flaviventer I. Geoffroy, 1850; rufipes Gray, 1871; rufiventer Gray, 1870

= Red-bellied lemur =

Species of lemur

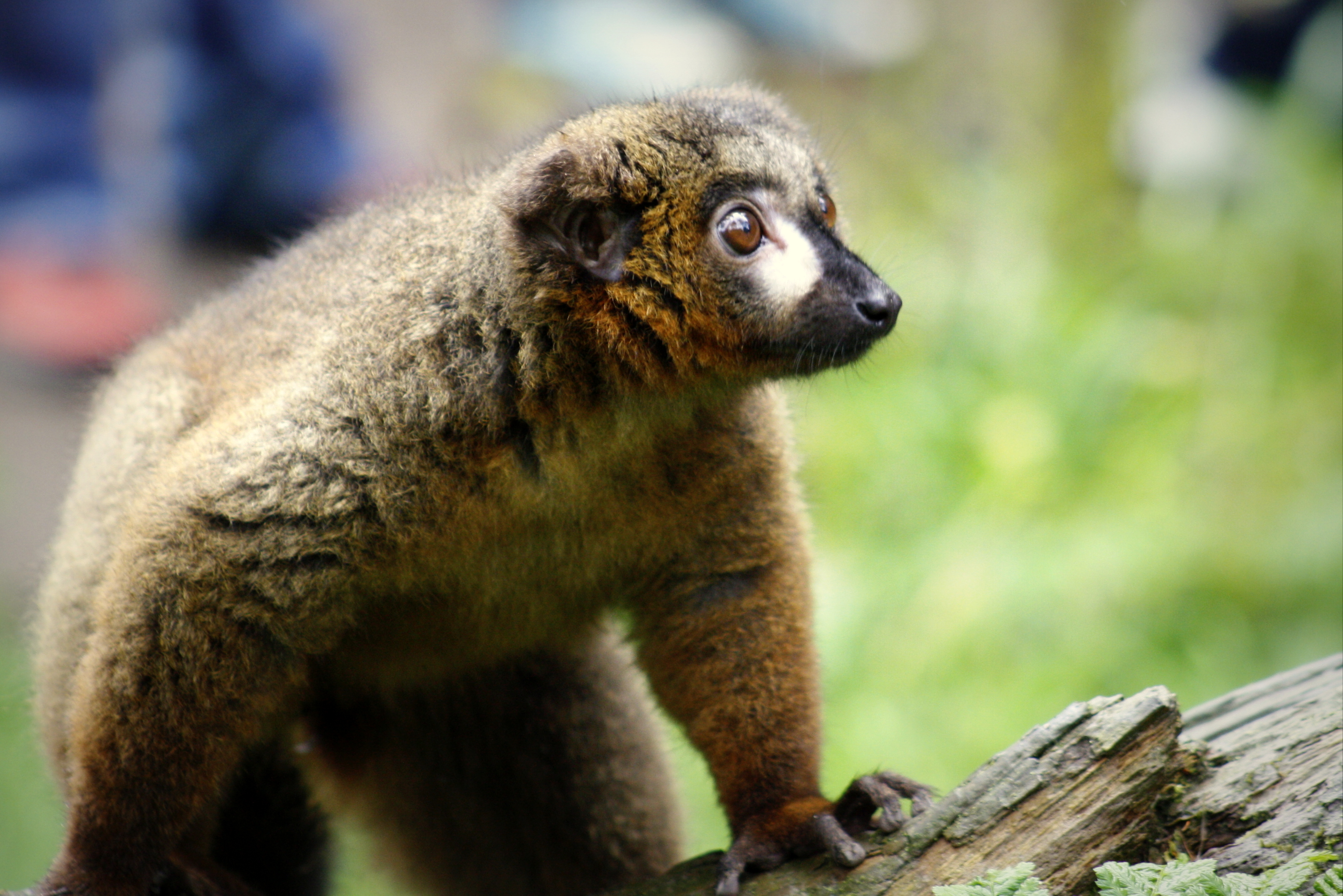
Male

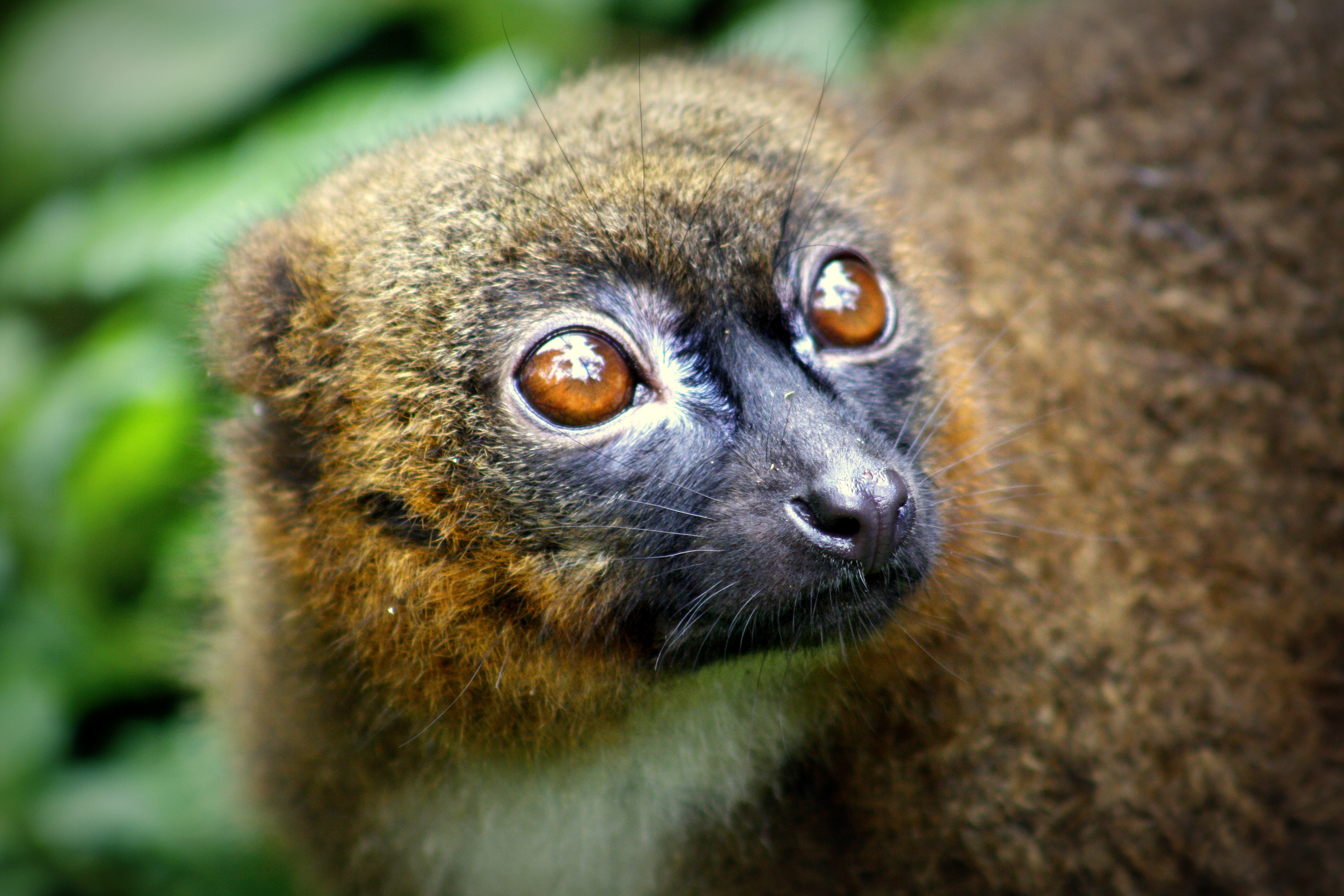
Female

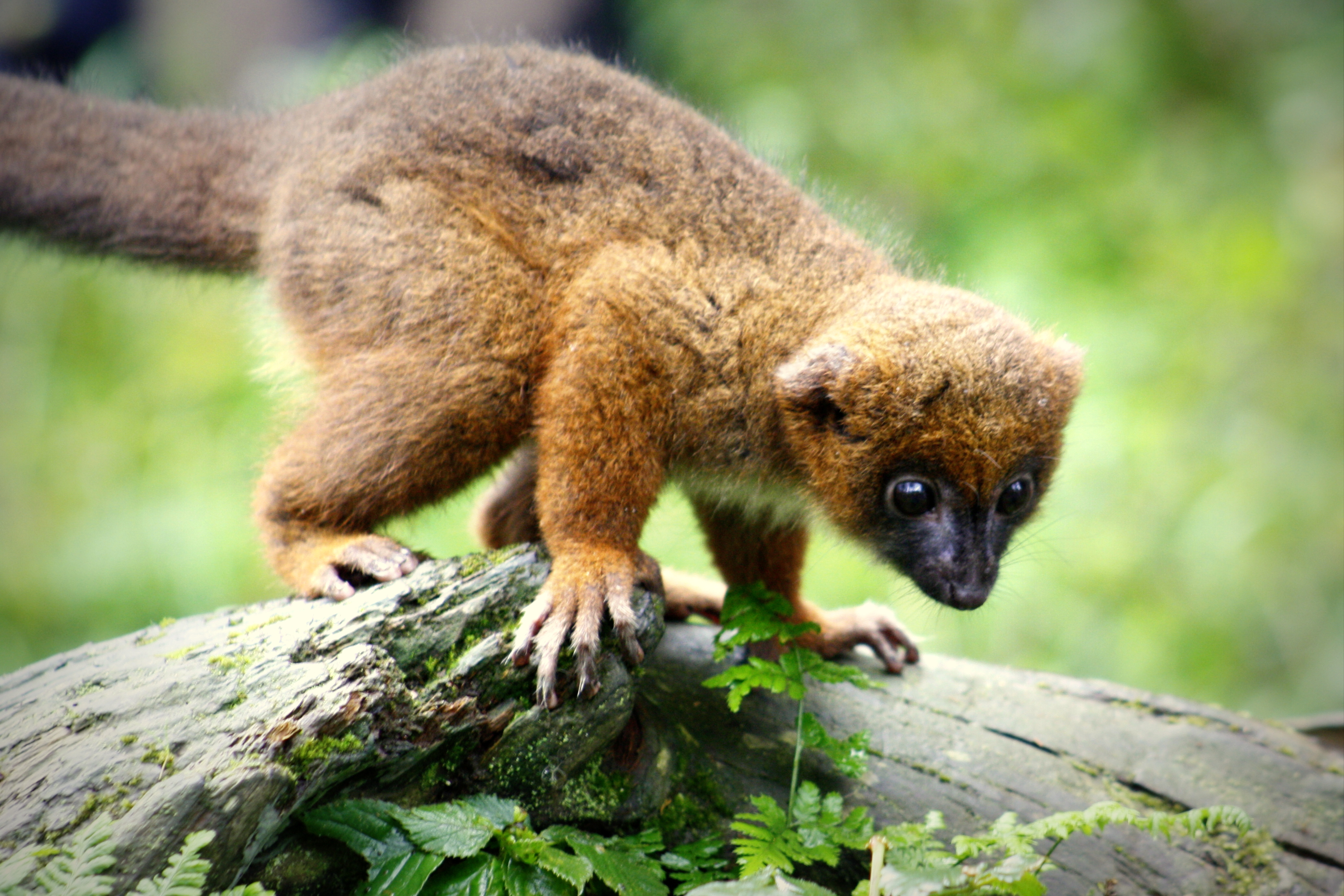
Juvenile

The red-bellied lemur (Eulemur rubriventer) is a medium-sized strepsirrhine primate with a luxuriant chestnut brown coat. This lemur is endemic to eastern Madagascan rainforests and is distinguished by patches of white skin below the eyes, giving rise to a "teardrop" effect, particularly conspicuous in the male.

The species, first identified in 1850, exhibits diurnal behaviour and marked sexual dimorphism. The red-bellied lemur has been studied extensively since the mid-1980s, primarily in Ranomafana National Park. This lemur species is designated as vulnerable according to the IUCN Red List, due to threats endangering habitats from slash-and-burn agriculture in Madagascar.

== Etymology ==
The various Malagasy names for the red-bellied lemur include tongo, tagona, halomena, kirioka, and soamiera. In the French scientific literature (Madagascar's second official language is French, due to prior colonisation by France), the species is called lémur à ventre rouge.

== Description ==
Being sexually dimorphic, the male of the species exhibits a medium-long, dense dorsal coat of intense chestnut brown. Ventrally, he is lighter and redder in hue, while his tail, muzzle and head are black. For the female, the dorsal area and tail resemble the male, whereas the ventral fur is a contrasting white-cream colour. Facial markings are similar to the male, except that "tear drops" are less exaggerated and spiry thick cheek hairs of the male are absent. Whereas the genus Eulemur relatives may exhibit ear tufts or a furry beard, these features are absent for E. rubriventer, which has thickened fur around its ears, lending a fuller facial appearance.

The adult red-bellied lemur has a length of 34 to 40 cm (13 to 16 in) (excluding tail) and a tail length which is almost twenty percent longer than the body itself; that is, body plus tail length may attain a total length of almost 1 m (3 ft 3 in). Typical body mass of a mature individual ranges from 1.6 to 2.4 kg (3.5 to 5.3 lb). The male has scent glands atop his head. Lifespans may easily exceed 20 years for both sexes.

== Range and distribution ==
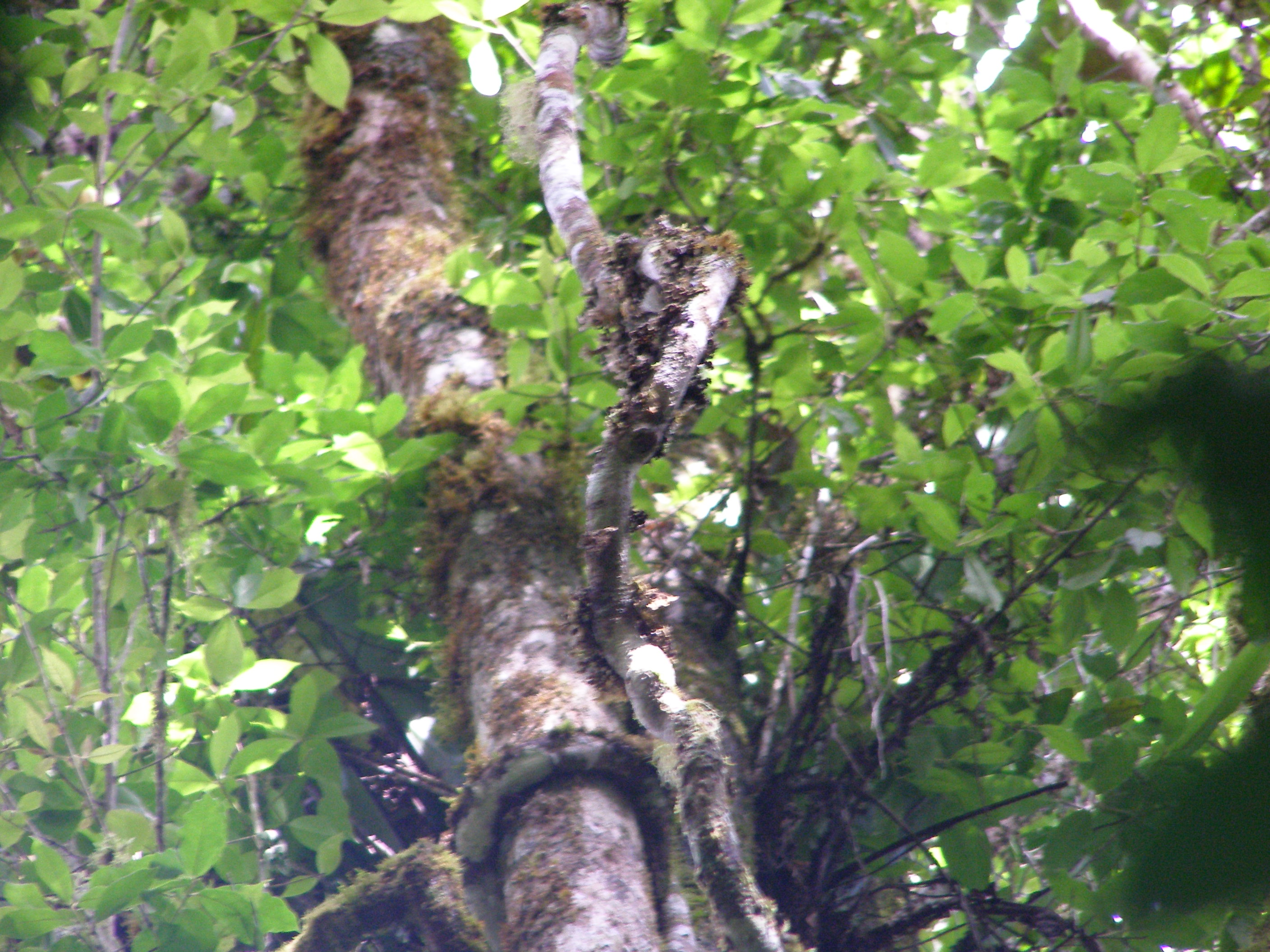
Mid-height view of arboreal habitat in Mantadia National Park

E. rubriventer occurs as far north as the Tsaratanana Massif at an elevation of 2,400 m (7,900 ft), then southerly to the Manampatrana River in a narrow strip of eastern Madagascar rainforest. In previous eras, its range extended further south to the Mananara River. This species is distributed thinly and is restricted only to intact rainforest; it does not occur at all on the Masolala Peninsula.

The red-bellied lemur is sympatric with four other Eulemur species: in the extreme north of its range, the white-headed lemur E. albifrons; at mid-range, the common brown lemur E. fulvus; and in its southern range, the red-fronted brown lemur E. rufus and the gray-headed lemur E. cinereiceps. E. rubriventer is, however, easily distinguished from these relatives by the male's distinctive white eye "tear drops" and the rich darkness of the fur of both sexes. A distinction of appearance occurs within E. rubriventer in that northern range males (e.g. Mantadia National Park north) have a more distinctive reddish belly than the southern range counterparts, as in Ranomafana National Park.

The forest type within the red-bellied lemur's range is characterized by dense evergreen vegetation, with a canopy of 25 to 35 m (82 to 115 ft). Typical canopy genera include Dalbergia, Diospyros, Ocotea, Symphonia, and Tambourissa; emergents of Canarium, Albizia and Neobrochoneura acuminata are also present. The eastern lowland forests also have a rich diversity of Pandanus, bamboo, and epiphytic orchid species.

== Behaviour ==
The red-bellied lemur aggregates in monogamous groups ranging from two to 10 individuals. It is one of the few lemurs to be recognized as cathemeral, having both diurnal and nocturnal activity patterns. The home range is estimated to be 25 to 35 acres (10 to 14 ha) with a typical density of five animals per acre. Groups are typically cohesive as they move within their home range, foraging on over 30 species of plants. Considered by some to be a frugivore, it also feeds on leaves, nectar, and flowers of many plant species; this lemur is believed to be a useful and efficient seed disperser.

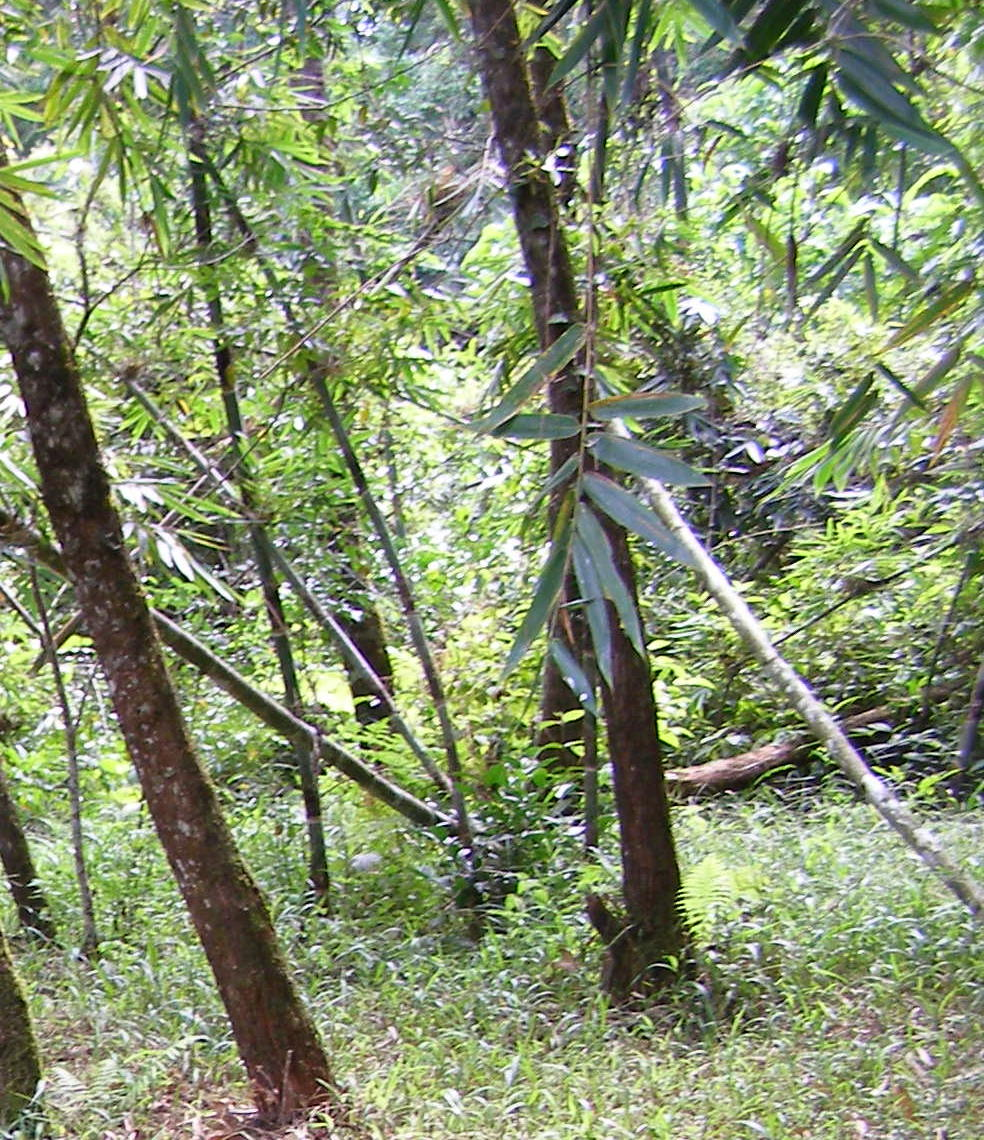
Lower story of Montadia rainforest habitat at a clearing

A typical and maximum frequency of births is one offspring per female per year, with initial year infant mortality around 50%. Births normally occur in October and November (early summer in this Southern Hemisphere habitat). The young use their prehensile instincts to attach to the mother and father alternately for the first 33 to 37 days of life. At this point, the mother often refuses further transport services, whilst the father may continue to provide such for another 9 weeks.

== Conservation ==
Modern feeding habits have expanded the species' diet to the introduced "Chinese" (actually Brazilian) guava (Psidium cattleyanum). Groups of the red-bellied lemur have become somewhat habituated to humans along certain trail areas in Ramomafana National Park (around Belle Vue) starting in May and June, and much rarer in some lower trail areas of Montadia National Park starting in April. In both instances, the species exhibits a tame behaviour to approaching humans who are silent and walk softly. The animals will descend from the trees to within 2–3 m (6.6–9.8 ft), staring back at the humans with equal curiosity allowing themselves to be photographed as they cling to vertical trunks of saplings, and occasionally engaging in a terrestrial scamper.

E. rubriventer occurs in five national parks and seven special reserves in eastern Madagascar, but is classified as vulnerable (IUCN Red List) due to ongoing habitat reduction from slash-and-burn farming, illegal logging, and even hunting. The species is the subject of current study in its natural habitat as well as in captivity in research centers such as the Duke Lemur Center.

== See also ==
- Madagascar lowland forests
- Tropical moist broadleaf forest
