= Iryanthera megistocarpa =

Conservation status
- Near Threatened (IUCN 3.1)

Scientific classification
- Kingdom: Plantae
- Clade: Embryophytes
- Clade: Tracheophytes
- Clade: Spermatophytes
- Clade: Angiosperms
- Clade: Magnoliids
- Order: Magnoliales
- Family: Myristicaceae
- Genus: Iryanthera
- Species: I. megistocarpa

Binomial name
- Iryanthera megistocarpa A.H.Gentry

Species of flowering plant

Iryanthera megistocarpa is a species of flowering plant in the family Myristicaceae. It is endemic to Panama. It is threatened by habitat loss.
