= Staudtia pterocarpa =

Conservation status
- Vulnerable (IUCN 2.3)

Scientific classification
- Kingdom: Plantae
- Clade: Embryophytes
- Clade: Tracheophytes
- Clade: Spermatophytes
- Clade: Angiosperms
- Clade: Magnoliids
- Order: Magnoliales
- Family: Myristicaceae
- Genus: Staudtia
- Species: S. pterocarpa

Binomial name
- Staudtia pterocarpa (Warb.) Warb.

Synonyms
- Brochoneura pterocarpa Warb.

Species of tree

Staudtia pterocarpa, commonly known as pau-vermelho, is a species of plant in the family Myristicaceae. It is a tree that is endemic to São Tomé Island, sometimes growing to a height of 50 m (200 ft) with a trunk diameter of 10 cm (4 in) at chest height. It has characteristic reddish brown, flaky bark which has been used to treat medical conditions such as bruising. The timber is valuable in construction but the species is threatened by logging. The specific epithet (pterocarpa) is derived from the Ancient Greek words pteron meaning a "wing" or "feather" and karpos meaning "fruit".
