= Pycnanthus =

Pycnanthus may refer to:

- Pycnanthus (sea anemone), genus of sea anemones in the family Actinostolidae
- Pycnanthus (plant), genus of plants in the nutmeg (Myristicaceae) family
