= Otoba acuminata =

Conservation status
- Least Concern (IUCN 3.1)

Scientific classification
- Kingdom: Plantae
- Clade: Embryophytes
- Clade: Tracheophytes
- Clade: Spermatophytes
- Clade: Angiosperms
- Clade: Magnoliids
- Order: Magnoliales
- Family: Myristicaceae
- Genus: Otoba
- Species: O. acuminata

Binomial name
- Otoba acuminata (Standl.) A.H.Gentry

Synonyms
- Dialyanthera acuminata Standl.

Species of flowering plant

Otoba acuminata is a species of flowering plant in the family Myristicaceae. It is a tree native to Costa Rica, Panama, and northwestern Colombia. It is used for medicine and food. It is threatened by habitat loss.
