= Iryanthera juruensis =

Conservation status
- Least Concern (IUCN 3.1)

Scientific classification
- Kingdom: Plantae
- Clade: Embryophytes
- Clade: Tracheophytes
- Clade: Spermatophytes
- Clade: Angiosperms
- Clade: Magnoliids
- Order: Magnoliales
- Family: Myristicaceae
- Genus: Iryanthera
- Species: I. juruensis

Binomial name
- Iryanthera juruensis Warb.

Synonyms
- Iryanthera densiflora Huber; Iryanthera grandiflora Huber; Iryanthera trigona Markgr.

Species of tree

Iryanthera juruensis is a species of flowering plant in the Myristaceae family. It is a tree native to Panama and tropical South America.
