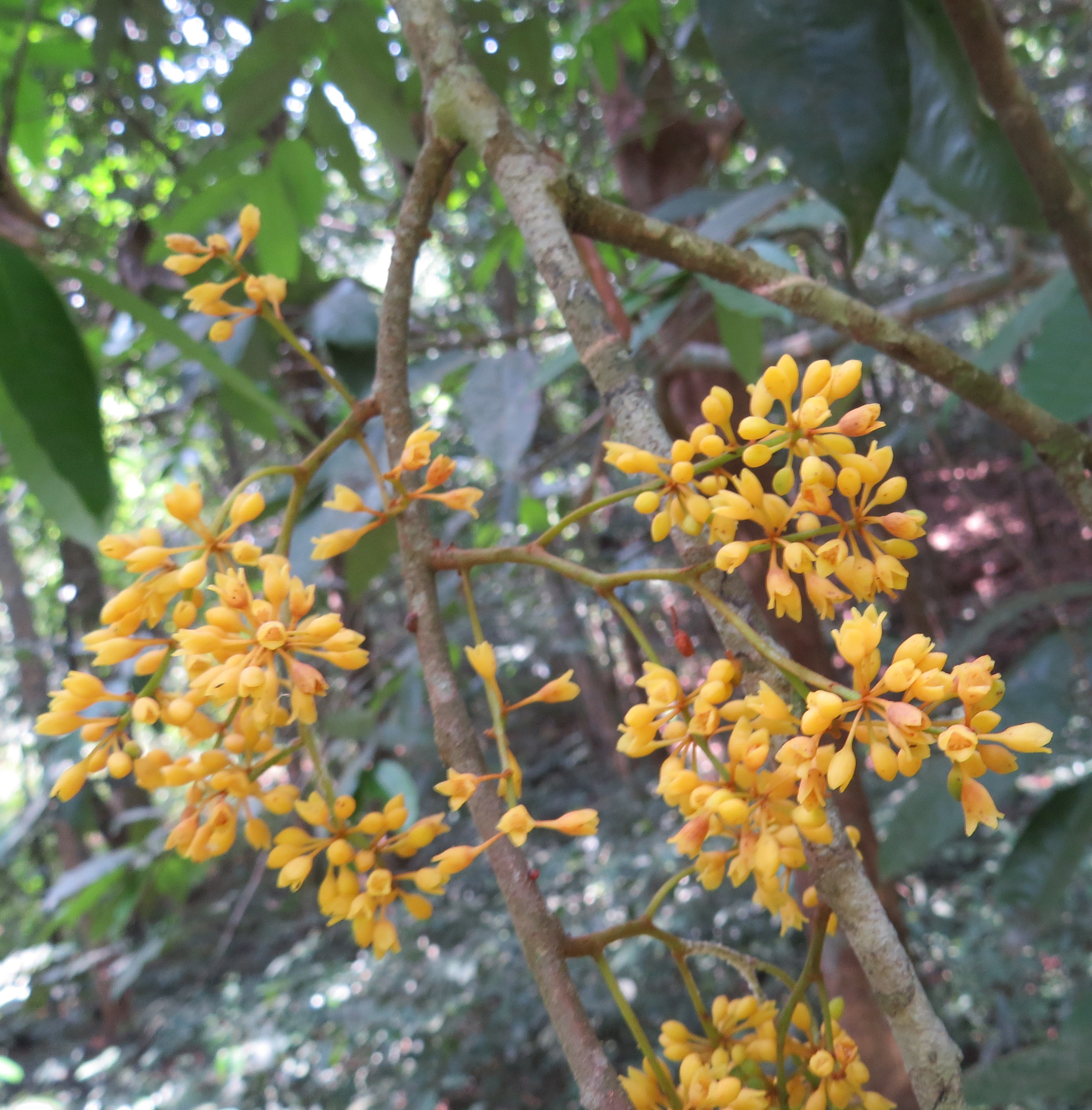
- Gymnacranthera canarica flowers

Scientific classification
- Kingdom: Plantae
- Clade: Embryophytes
- Clade: Tracheophytes
- Clade: Spermatophytes
- Clade: Angiosperms
- Clade: Magnoliids
- Order: Magnoliales
- Family: Myristicaceae
- Genus: Gymnacranthera (A.DC.) Warb.

= Gymnacranthera =

Genus of flowering plants

Gymnacranthera is a genus of flowering plants in the family Myristicaceae found from India to Thailand, Malesia, New Guinea, and the Bismarck Archipelago.

== Species ==
Seven species are accepted.

- Gymnacranthera bancana (Miq.) J.Sinclair
- Gymnacranthera canarica (Bedd. ex King) Warb.
- Gymnacranthera contracta Warb.
- Gymnacranthera farquhariana (Hook.f. & Thomson) Warb.
- Gymnacranthera forbesii (King) Warb.
- Gymnacranthera maliliensis R.T.A.Schouten
- Gymnacranthera ocellata R.T.A.Schouten
