= Bicuiba =

Conservation status
- Endangered (IUCN 2.3)

Scientific classification
- Kingdom: Plantae
- Clade: Tracheophytes
- Clade: Angiosperms
- Clade: Magnoliids
- Order: Magnoliales
- Family: Myristicaceae
- Genus: Bicuiba; J.J.de Wilde
- Species: B. oleifera

Binomial name
- Bicuiba oleifera (Schott) J.J.de Wilde

Synonyms
- Myristica oleifera Schott; Virola oleifera (Schott) A.C. Sm.

Genus of flowering plants

Bicuiba is a monotypic genus of flowering plants in the nutmeg family, Myristicaceae. The only species is Bicuiba oleifera, which is endemic to southeastern Brazil. It grows in the forests of the Atlantic coast.
