= Otoba =

Scientific classification
- Kingdom: Plantae
- Clade: Embryophytes
- Clade: Tracheophytes
- Clade: Spermatophytes
- Clade: Angiosperms
- Clade: Magnoliids
- Order: Magnoliales
- Family: Myristicaceae
- Genus: Otoba (DC.) H.Karst.

Synonyms
- Dialyanthera Warb.

Genus of flowering plants

Otoba is a genus of trees in family Myristicaceae. It ranges from Nicaragua to Venezuela, northern Brazil, and Bolivia.

== Species ==
14 species are accepted.

- Otoba acuminata (Standl.) A.H.Gentry
- Otoba awaensis D.Santam. & Á.J.Pérez
- Otoba cyclobasis T.S.Jaram. & Balslev
- Otoba glycycarpa (Ducke) W.A.Rodrigues & T.S.Jaram.
- Otoba gordoniifolia (A.DC.) A.H.Gentry
- Otoba gracilipes (A.C.Sm.) A.H.Gentry
- Otoba latialata (Pittier) A.H.Gentry
- Otoba lehmannii (A.C.Sm.) A.H.Gentry
- Otoba llanganatensis D.Santam. & Á.J.Pérez
- Otoba novogranatensis Moldenke
- Otoba parvifolia (Markgr.) A.H.Gentry
- Otoba scottmorii D.Santam.
- Otoba squamosa D.Santam.
- Otoba vespertilio D.Santam. & J.E.Jiménez
