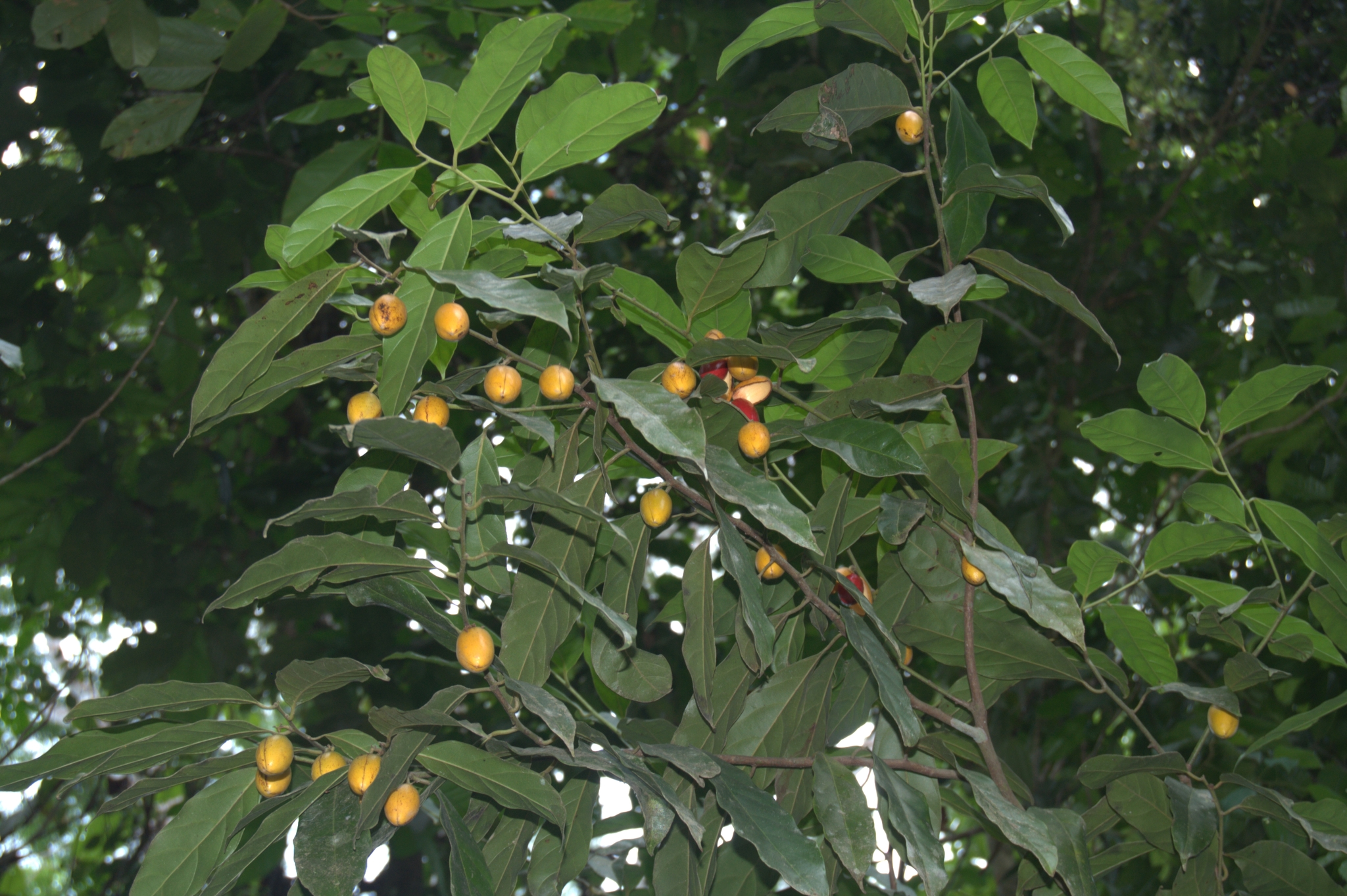
- Compsoneura excelsa

Scientific classification
- Kingdom: Plantae
- Clade: Embryophytes
- Clade: Tracheophytes
- Clade: Spermatophytes
- Clade: Angiosperms
- Clade: Magnoliids
- Order: Magnoliales
- Family: Myristicaceae
- Genus: Compsoneura (A.DC.) Warb.

Type species
- Compsoneura sprucei (A.DC.) Warb.

= Compsoneura =

Genus of flowering plants

Compsoneura is a genus comprising 20 species of trees found in tropical lowland forests of the New World. It can be distinguished from other Neotropical Myristicaceae by its conspicuous parallel tertiary venation that is nearly perpendicular to the costa.

== Species ==
20 species are accepted.

- Compsoneura anoriensis Janovec & A.K.Neill
- Compsoneura atopa (A.C.Sm.) A.C.Sm.
- Compsoneura capitellata (Poepp. ex A.DC.) Warb.
- Compsoneura choibo Villanueva & Cogollo
- Compsoneura claroensis Janovec & A.K.Neill
- Compsoneura crassitepala Villanueva, Paz-López & W.Ariza
- Compsoneura cuatrecasasii A.C.Sm.
- Compsoneura debilis (Spruce ex A.DC.) Warb.
- Compsoneura diazii Janovec
- Compsoneura excelsa A.C.Sm.
- Compsoneura lapidiflora T.S.Jaram. & Balslev
- Compsoneura mexicana (Hemsl.) Janovec
- Compsoneura mutisii A.C.Sm.
- Compsoneura nallarettiana M.A.Ríos, R.Zárate & J.M.Grandez
- Compsoneura racemosa Ducke
- Compsoneura rigidifolia W.A.Rodrigues
- Compsoneura schultesiana W.A.Rodrigues
- Compsoneura sprucei (A.DC.) Warb.
- Compsoneura trianae Warb.
- Compsoneura ulei Warb.
