= Scyphocephalium =

Scientific classification
- Kingdom: Plantae
- Clade: Embryophytes
- Clade: Tracheophytes
- Clade: Spermatophytes
- Clade: Angiosperms
- Clade: Magnoliids
- Order: Magnoliales
- Family: Myristicaceae
- Genus: Scyphocephalium; Warb.

Synonyms
- Ochocoa Pierre

Genus of flowering plants

Scyphocephalium is a genus of plants in family Myristicaceae native to west-central Africa, containing two species. One species contains chemicals with significant in vitro antibacterial activity.

The genus was described by Otto Warburg in 1897.

== Species ==
Two species are accepted:

- Scyphocephalium chrysothrix Warb. – Cameroon
- Scyphocephalium mannii (Benth. & Hook.f.) Warb. – Cameroon, Republic of the Congo, Gabon, and southern Nigeria
