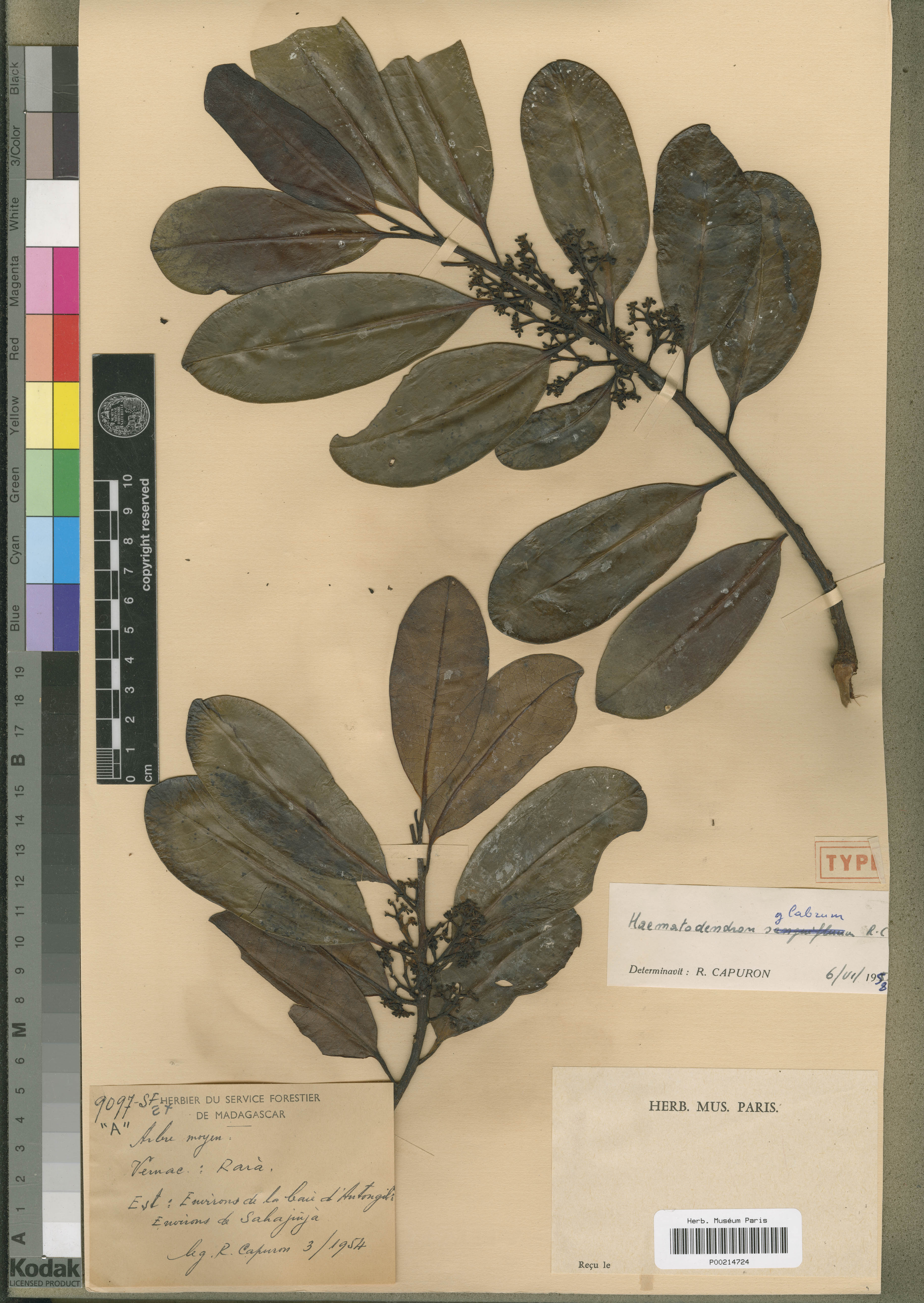

Conservation status
- Near Threatened (IUCN 3.1)

Scientific classification
- Kingdom: Plantae
- Clade: Embryophytes
- Clade: Tracheophytes
- Clade: Spermatophytes
- Clade: Angiosperms
- Clade: Magnoliids
- Order: Magnoliales
- Family: Myristicaceae
- Genus: Haematodendron; Capuron
- Species: H. glabrum

Binomial name
- Haematodendron glabrum Capuron

= Haematodendron =

Genus of trees

Haematodendron is a monotypic genus of trees in the family Myristicaceae containing a single species, Haematodendron glabrum, endemic to forests of east Madagascar.
