= Staudtia =

Scientific classification
- Kingdom: Plantae
- Clade: Embryophytes
- Clade: Tracheophytes
- Clade: Spermatophytes
- Clade: Angiosperms
- Clade: Magnoliids
- Order: Magnoliales
- Family: Myristicaceae
- Genus: Staudtia; Warb.

Genus of plants

Staudtia is a genus of flowering plants in family Myristicaceae. It contains two species native to central Africa:

- Staudtia kamerunensis Warb.
- Staudtia pterocarpa (Warb.) Warb.

The genus was named by Otto Warburg in 1897.
