= Osteophloeum =

Conservation status
- Least Concern (IUCN 3.1)

Scientific classification
- Kingdom: Plantae
- Clade: Embryophytes
- Clade: Tracheophytes
- Clade: Spermatophytes
- Clade: Angiosperms
- Clade: Magnoliids
- Order: Magnoliales
- Family: Myristicaceae
- Genus: Osteophloeum; Warb.
- Species: O. platyspermum

Binomial name
- Osteophloeum platyspermum (Spruce ex A.DC.) Warb.

Varieties
- Osteophloeum platyspermum var. platyspermum; Osteophloeum platyspermum var. sulcatum (Little) T.S.Jaram. & Balslev

Synonyms
- Myristica platysperma Spruce ex A.DC.; Palala platysperma (Spruce ex A.DC.) Kuntze; synonyms of var. platyspermum: Iryanthera krukovii A.C.Sm.; synonyms of var. sulcatum: Osteophloeum sulcatum Little

Genus of trees

Osteophloeum is a genus of flowering plant in the family Myristicaceae. It contains a single tree species, Osteophloeum platyspermum, native to Panama and northern and western South America.

Two varieties are accepted:

- Osteophloeum platyspermum var. platyspermum – Bolivia, Northern Brazil, Colombia, Ecuador, French Guiana, Guyana, Panama, Peru, and Venezuela
- Osteophloeum platyspermum var. sulcatum (Little) T.S.Jaram. & Balslev – Colombia and Ecuador
