= Paramyristica =

Scientific classification
- Kingdom: Plantae
- Clade: Embryophytes
- Clade: Tracheophytes
- Clade: Spermatophytes
- Clade: Angiosperms
- Clade: Magnoliids
- Order: Magnoliales
- Family: Myristicaceae
- Genus: Paramyristica; W.J.de Wilde
- Species: P. sepicana

Binomial name
- Paramyristica sepicana (Foreman) W.J.de Wilde

Synonyms
- Myristica sepicana Foreman

Genus of plants

Paramyristica is a monotypic genus of flowering plants belonging to the family Myristicaceae. The only species is Paramyristica sepicana. It is a tree native to New Guinea.
