= Brochoneura =

Scientific classification
- Kingdom: Plantae
- Clade: Embryophytes
- Clade: Tracheophytes
- Clade: Spermatophytes
- Clade: Angiosperms
- Clade: Magnoliids
- Order: Magnoliales
- Family: Myristicaceae
- Genus: Brochoneura; Warb.

Species
- Brochoneura acuminata (Lam.) Warb.; Brochoneura madagascariensis (Lam.) Warb.; Brochoneura vouri (Baill.) Warb.

Synonyms
- Neobrochoneura Figueiredo & Gideon F.Sm.

Genus of flowering plants

Brochoneura is a genus of flowering plants in the nutmeg family, Myristicaceae. It includes three species of trees endemic to eastern Madagascar.

- Brochoneura acuminata (Lam.) Warb.
- Brochoneura madagascariensis (Lam.) Warb.
- Brochoneura vouri (Baill.) Warb.
