= Fleurette Andriantsilavo =

Madagascan civil servant and environmentalist

- Died: April 2005
- Citizenship: Madagascar
- Occupations: General Secretary of the Ministry of Environment, Water and Forests

Fleurette Andriantsilavo (died April 2005) was a civil servant and environmentalist from Madagascar, whom Fleurete's sportive lemur is named after, in honour of her work advocating for Madagascar's unique ecology throughout her career at the Ministry of Environment, Water and Forestry.

== Career ==
Andriantsilavo held the position of Secretary General of the Ministry of Environment, Water and Forests. She was known as a strong and determined advocate for the long-term conservation of Madagascar's ecology. She was instrumental in organising Madagascar to be the host of the 15th Annual Meeting for CITES in 1999. She developed environmental policies which included: sustainable coastal development; the regulation of the exportation of Madagascar's genetic resources and the intellectual property rights within its traditional heritage. She co-authored articles which include an examination of sustainable production for Prunus africanum and Centella asiatica. She held several roles during her career, including co-chair of the Vision Durban Group (GVD). She was instrumental in the development of the Makira forest partnership, sponsored by Mitusbishi.

She died in April 2005.

== Legacy ==
Fleurete's sportive lemur was named in her honour.
