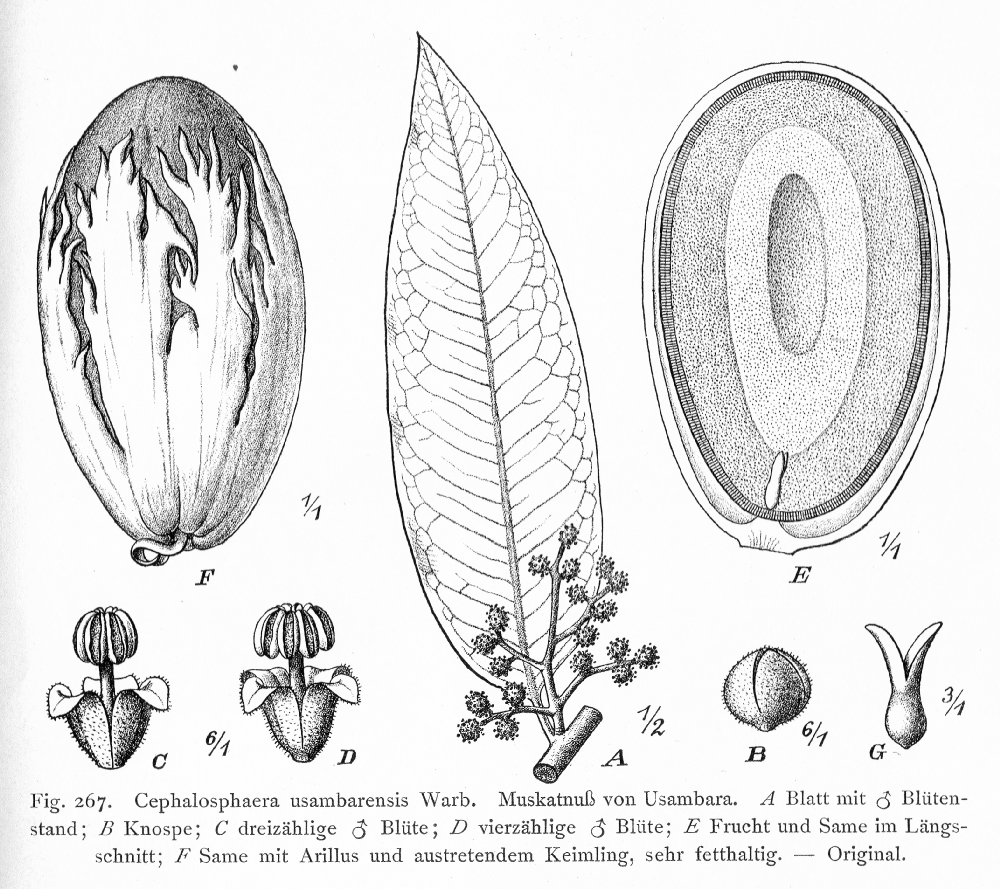

Conservation status
- Near Threatened (IUCN 3.1)

Scientific classification
- Kingdom: Plantae
- Clade: Embryophytes
- Clade: Tracheophytes
- Clade: Spermatophytes
- Clade: Angiosperms
- Clade: Magnoliids
- Order: Magnoliales
- Family: Myristicaceae
- Genus: Cephalosphaera; Warb. (1903)
- Species: C. usambarensis

Binomial name
- Cephalosphaera usambarensis (Warb.) Warb. (1903)

Synonyms
- Brochoneura usambarensis Warb. (1895)

= Cephalosphaera usambarensis =

Species of flowering plant

Cephalosphaera usambarensis is a species of tree native to the moist evergreen forests of Kenya and Tanzania. It is the sole species in genus Cephalosphaera.

== Range and habitat ==
Cephalosphaera usambarensis is restricted to small areas in the Usambara, Nguru, Uluguru, and Udzungwa mountains of Tanzania and the Shimba Hills of Kenya.

It is endemic to transitional rain forest, a mid-elevation plant community found on seaward-facing mountain slopes above 800 meters elevation, and occasionally at lower elevations in stream valleys.
