= Mauloutchia =

Scientific classification
- Kingdom: Plantae
- Clade: Embryophytes
- Clade: Tracheophytes
- Clade: Spermatophytes
- Clade: Angiosperms
- Clade: Magnoliids
- Order: Magnoliales
- Family: Myristicaceae
- Genus: Mauloutchia; Warb.

Genus of trees

Mauloutchia is a genus of trees endemic to the lowland eastern and northern rain forests of Madagascar. They can be distinguished by their non-monocyclic androecium with anthers basifixed and borne on short filaments.

== Species ==
Nine species are accepted.

- Mauloutchia annickiae Sauquet
- Mauloutchia capuronii Sauquet
- Mauloutchia chapelieri (Baill.) Warb.
- Mauloutchia coriacea Capuron
- Mauloutchia echinocarpa Capuron ex Sauquet
- Mauloutchia heckelii Capuron
- Mauloutchia humboltii (H. Perrier) Capuron
- Mauloutchia parvifolia Capuron
- Mauloutchia sambiranensis (Capuron) Sauquet
