= Coelocaryon =

Scientific classification
- Kingdom: Plantae
- Clade: Embryophytes
- Clade: Tracheophytes
- Clade: Spermatophytes
- Clade: Angiosperms
- Clade: Magnoliids
- Order: Magnoliales
- Family: Myristicaceae
- Genus: Coelocaryon; Warb.

Genus of flowering plants

Coelocaryon is a genus of flowering plants in the family Myristicaceae. It is native to tropical Africa.

== Species ==
According to Kew's Plants of the World Online, there are four accepted species:

- Coelocaryon botryoides Vermoesen
- Coelocaryon oxycarpum Stapf
- Coelocaryon preussii Warb.
- Coelocaryon sphaerocarpum Fouilloy
