= Iryanthera =

Scientific classification
- Kingdom: Plantae
- Clade: Embryophytes
- Clade: Tracheophytes
- Clade: Spermatophytes
- Clade: Angiosperms
- Clade: Magnoliids
- Order: Magnoliales
- Family: Myristicaceae
- Genus: Iryanthera (A.DC.) Warb.

Species
- See text

Genus of flowering plants

Iryanthera is a flowering plant genus in the family Myristicaceae. It includes 22 species native to tropical South America and Panama.

== Species ==
22 species are accepted.

- Iryanthera campinae W.A.Rodrigues
- Iryanthera coriacea Ducke
- Iryanthera crassifolia A.C. Sm.
- Iryanthera dialyandra Ducke
- Iryanthera elliptica Ducke – sangretoro
- Iryanthera grandis Ducke
- Iryanthera hostmannii (Benth.) Warb.
- Iryanthera inpae W.A. Rodrigues
- Iryanthera juruensis Warb.
- Iryanthera laevis Markgr.
- Iryanthera lancifolia Ducke – arbol camarón, cabo de hacha
- Iryanthera macrophylla Warb.
- Iryanthera megistocarpa A.H.Gentry
- Iryanthera megistophylla A.C.Sm.
- Iryanthera obovata Ducke
- Iryanthera olacoides (A.C.Sm.) A.C.Sm.
- Iryanthera paradoxa (Schwacke) Warb.
- Iryanthera paraensis Huber
- Iryanthera polyneura Ducke
- Iryanthera sagotiana (Benth.) Warb.
- Iryanthera tessmannii Markgr.
- Iryanthera tricornis Ducke
