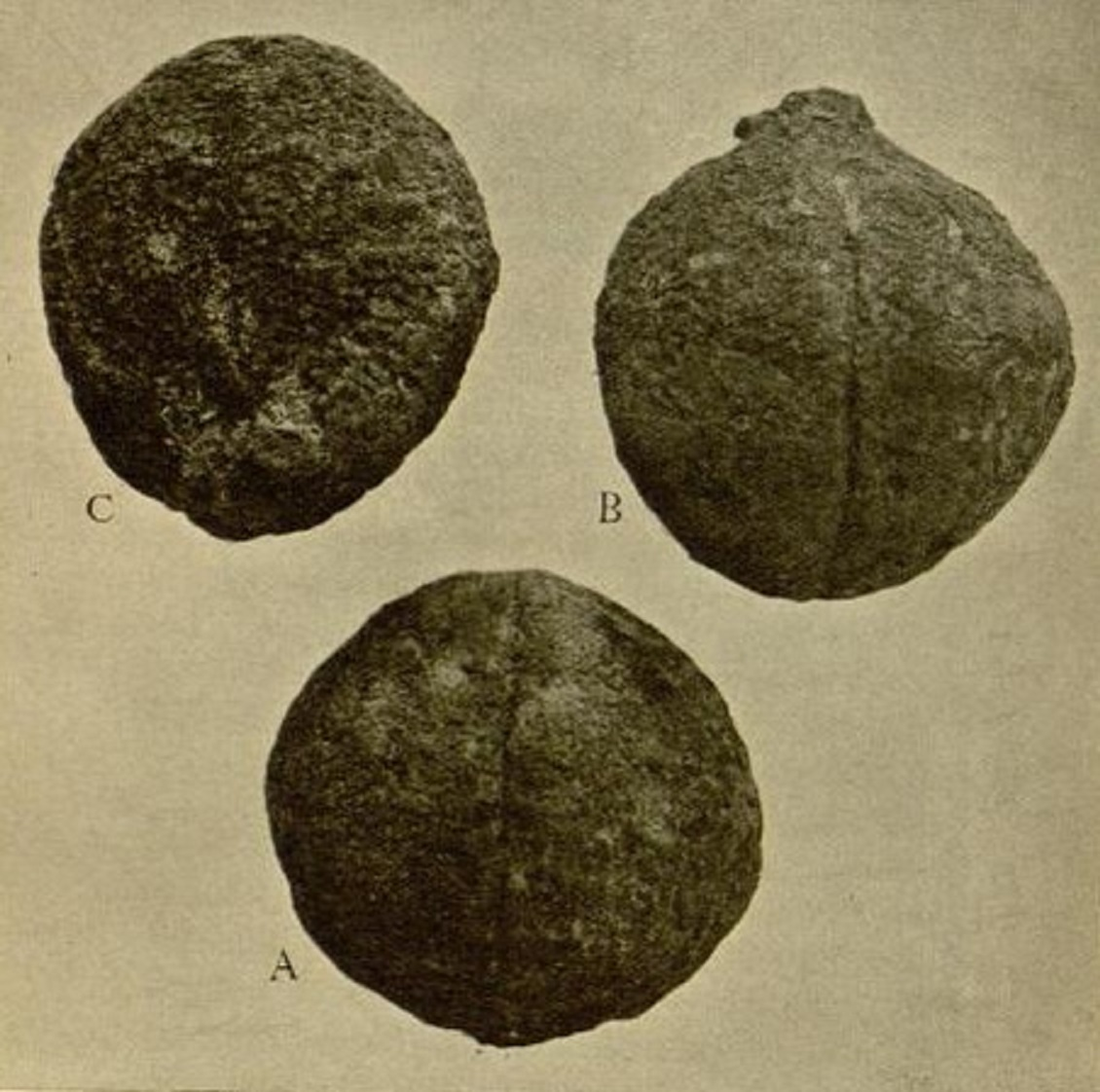
- fruits of B. acuminata

Conservation status
- Least Concern (IUCN 3.1)

Scientific classification
- Kingdom: Plantae
- Clade: Embryophytes
- Clade: Tracheophytes
- Clade: Spermatophytes
- Clade: Angiosperms
- Clade: Magnoliids
- Order: Magnoliales
- Family: Myristicaceae
- Genus: Brochoneura
- Species: B. acuminata

Binomial name
- Brochoneura acuminata (Lam.) Warb. (1897)

Synonyms
- Brochoneura freneei Heckel (1910), not validly publ.; Myristica acuminata Lam. (1791); Neobrochoneura acuminata (Lam.) Figueiredo & Gideon F.Sm. (2020)

= Brochoneura acuminata =

Species of flowering plant

Brochoneura acuminata is a species of tree in the nutmeg family, Myristicaceae. It is endemic to Madagascar, where it is known by the local names Hafotrarano, Menaky, and Rara. It is an evergreen tree or large shrub, growing 2.5 to 18 meters tall. It grows in the rainforests of eastern Madagascar, in lowland rain forest and littoral forest from sea level to 600 meters elevation.

Brochoneura acuminata is known from 26 subpopulations in Atsimo-Atsinanana, Vatovavy-Fitovinany, Analanjirofo, Atsinanana, and Anosy regions. Its population and range are declining, and it is threatened by habitat loss from mining, logging, and forest clearing for agriculture and shifting cultivation. Its conservation status is assessed as Least Concern.
