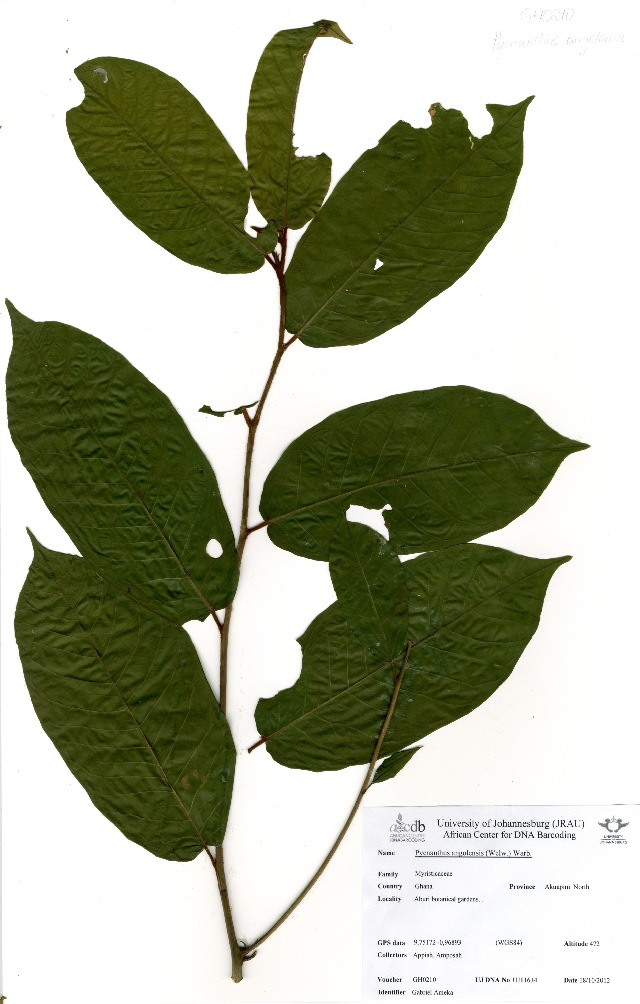
- Pycnanthus angolensis

Scientific classification
- Kingdom: Plantae
- Clade: Embryophytes
- Clade: Tracheophytes
- Clade: Spermatophytes
- Clade: Angiosperms
- Clade: Magnoliids
- Order: Magnoliales
- Family: Myristicaceae
- Genus: Pycnanthus; Warb.

= Pycnanthus (plant) =

Genus of flowering plants

Pycnanthus is a genus of flowering plants in the nutmeg family, Myristicaceae. There are 4 species, all native to tropical Africa. Some species are lianescent, an unusual feature in this family which is otherwise composed of hardwood trees.

== Species ==
According to Kew's Plants of the World Online, there are four accepted species:

- Pycnanthus angolensis (Welw.) Warb. – African nutmeg, ilomba
- Pycnanthus dinklagei Warb.
- Pycnanthus marchalianus Ghesq.
- Pycnanthus microcephalus (Benth.) Stapf
