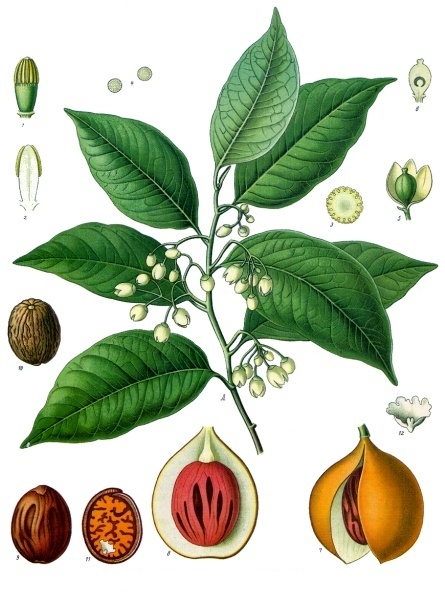
- Myristica fragrans (Nutmeg), Koehler (1887)

Scientific classification
- Kingdom: Plantae
- Clade: Embryophytes
- Clade: Tracheophytes
- Clade: Spermatophytes
- Clade: Angiosperms
- Clade: Magnoliids
- Order: Magnoliales
- Family: Myristicaceae; R.Br.

Genera
- See text

= Myristicaceae =

Myristicaceae Temporal range: Eocene - recent

Family of flowering plants

The Myristicaceae are a family of flowering plants native to Africa, Asia, Pacific islands, and the Americas and has been recognized by most taxonomists. It is sometimes called the "nutmeg family", after its most famous member, Myristica fragrans, the source of the spices nutmeg and mace. The best known genera are Myristica in Asia and Virola in the Neotropics.

The family consists of about 21 genera with about 520 species of trees, shrubs and rarely lianas (Pycnanthus) found in tropical forests around the world. Most of the species are large trees that are valued in the timber industry.

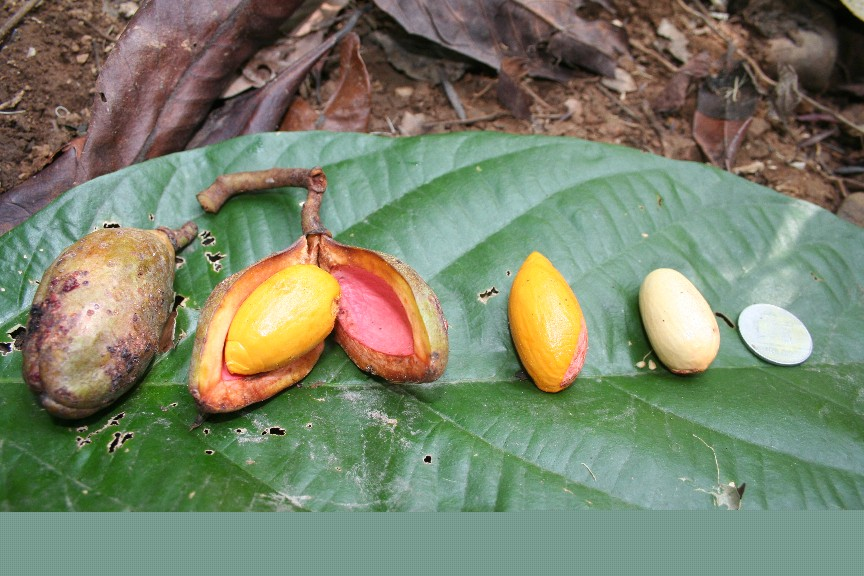
Fruits of Horsfieldia kingii

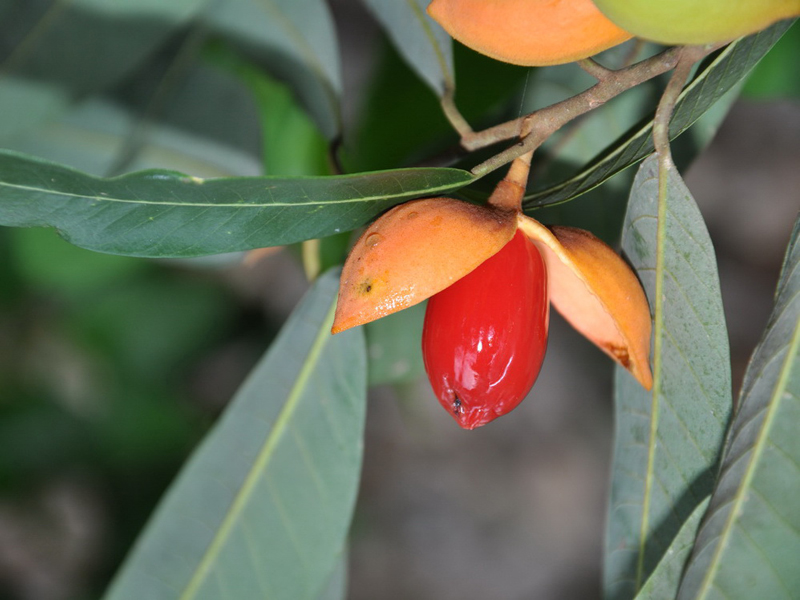
Fruit of Knema globularia

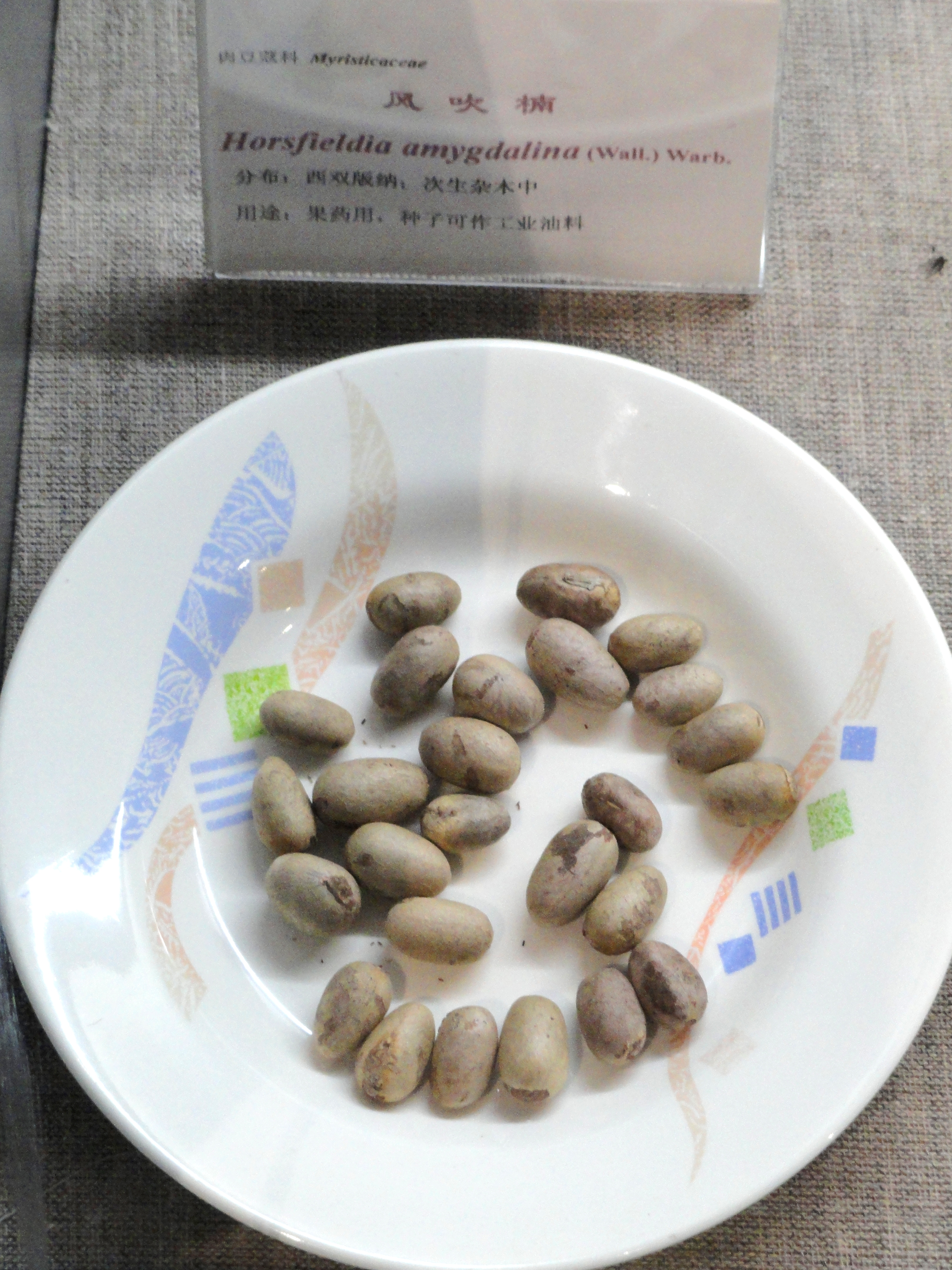
Seeds of Horsfieldia amygdalina

== Description ==
They are typically trees with reddish sap and distinctive pagoda-like growth (known as myristicaceous branching) in which horizontal branching only occurs at certain nodes along the main axis of the trunk, each node separated by a large gap where no branching occurs. All genera are dioecious, except Endocomia and some Iryanthera. The inner bark is usually pink to reddish or light colored then oxidizing as such. When cut, the tree trunk exudes a red or orange resin; stems and young twigs often will exude clear sap (not colored) that may smell spicy. The foliage is generally spicy-aromatic and the leaves are glossy, dark green, simple, entire, 2-ranked, undersides often whitish or tomentose, with dark brown punctations or not, usually with complex caducous hairs colored golden yellow to red. The flowers are usually small, highly reduced, fragrant, with 3-5 tepals, inner perianth whitish-green, yellow, orange, reddish-pink to rusty-brown, arranged in axillary paniculate inflorescences or unbranched wart-like structures (like Knema). The female flowers are without staminodes, with stigmas often lobed. The male flowers with fused stamens arranged in a synandrium. Pollen is monosulcate, often boat-shaped.

The fruit is a leathery dehiscent capsule, with rusty indument or not, containing a single seed that is arillate or not; when present, the aril variously laciniate or entire. In most genera, the aril is colored red but also can be orange or white and translucent. The single seed has ruminate endosperm and is uniform in color or rarely with black blotches (Compsoneura).

Many species within the family exhibit highly complex phytochemistry with numerous compounds having been described from the leaves, bark, fruits, arils, and seeds of many species.

== Taxonomy ==
In the APG IV system of 2016, Myristaceae are placed in the order Magnoliales in the magnoliids clade. The genera placed in the family are related as shown in the following cladogram:

- Myristicaceae
  - Myristicoids
    - - Compsoneura
      - - Endocomia
        - Virola
      - - - Bicuiba
          - Haematodendron
        - - Iryanthera
          - Osteophloeum
    - Gymnacranthera
    - Horsfieldia
    - Knema
    - Scyphocephalium
    - - Myristica
      - Paramyristica
  - Pycnanthoids
    - Otoba
    - - Coelocaryon
      - Pycnanthus
  - Mauloutchioids
    - Staudtia
    - - Cephalosphaera
      - - Doyleanthus
        - - Brochoneura
          - Mauloutchia

=== List of genera ===
As of June 2026, Plants of the World Online accepted the following genera:

- Bicuiba J.J.de Wilde
- Brochoneura Warb.
- Cephalosphaera Warb.
- Coelocaryon Warb.
- Compsoneura (DC.) Warb.
- Doyleanthus Sauquet
- Endocomia W.J.de Wilde
- Gymnacranthera (A.DC.) Warb.
- Haematodendron Capuron
- Horsfieldia Willd.
- Iryanthera (A.DC.) Warb.
- Knema Lour.
- Mauloutchia Warb.
- Myristica Gronov.
- Osteophloeum Warb.
- Otoba (DC.) H.Karst.
- Paramyristica W.J.de Wilde
- Pycnanthus Warb.
- Scyphocephalium Warb.
- Staudtia Warb.
- Virola Aubl.

== Ecology ==
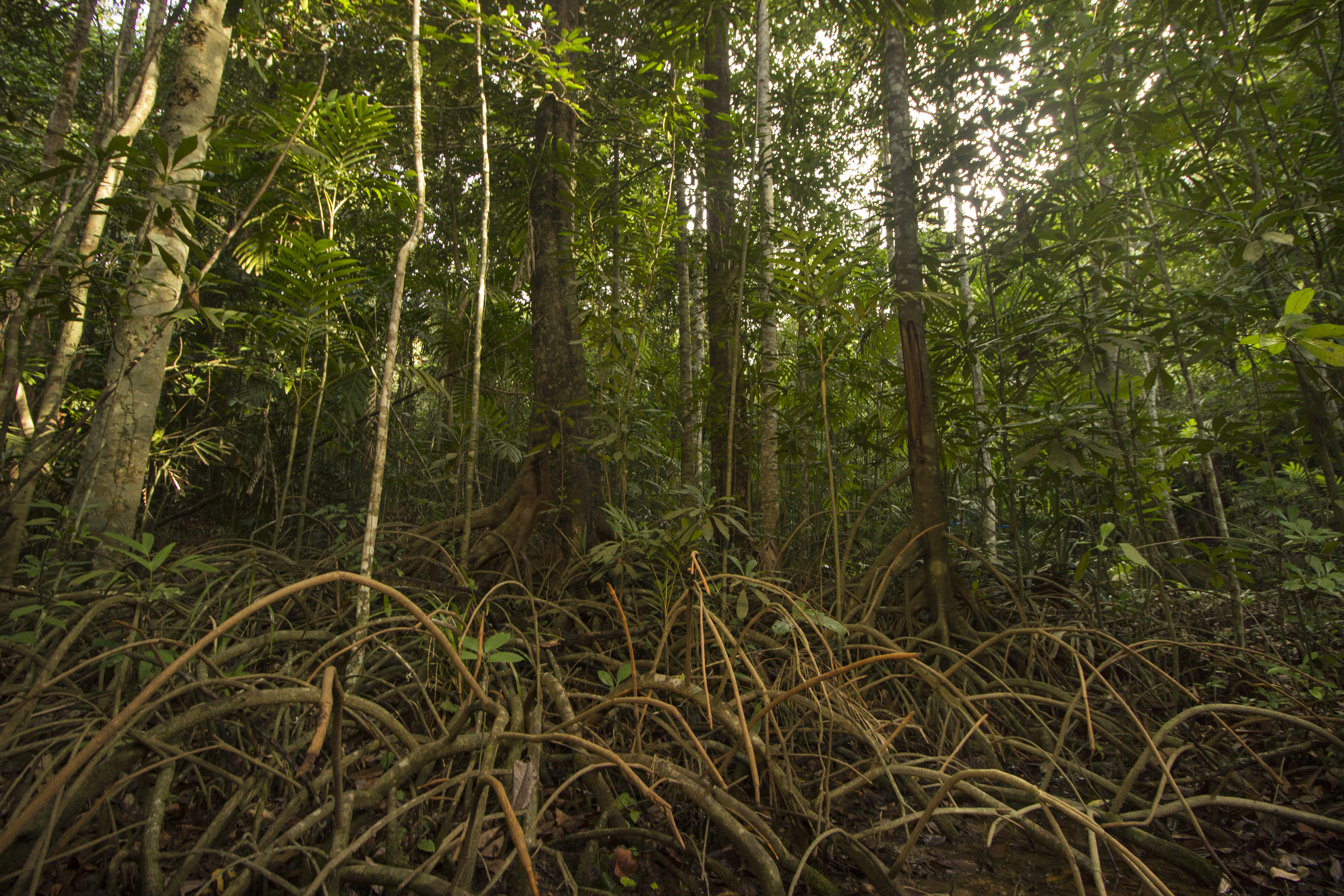
A Myristica swamp forest forming part of the Kathlekan region in the Western Ghats of India. These unique habitats are dominated by Myristica species that bear stilt roots. Due to agricultural development, they are now threatened.

Myristicaceae are found in humid lowland forests, swamp forests, submontane forests, and cloud forests at elevations up to 2100 m. Some of the anatomical characters presented by this family suggest that in the past they could live in xeric (dry) environments, but now their species are linked to tropical rainforests.

The species present anthesis at night, and pollination is usually carried out by small beetles from the Anthicidae family that resemble ants and consume pollen (e.g., Myristica fragrans is probably pollinated by the beetle Formicomus braminus). The strong floral scent that attracts beetles emerges from the ends of the connectives of the stamens. However, Myristica is probably pollinated by true ants, a case of myrmecophily.

A few New Guinea Myristica species have evolved hollow stem swellings in which ants reside. This facilitates a mutualistic relationship known as myrmecophily, and is similar to that of Cecropia.

== Uses ==
The most important products of the family by far are the nutmeg and mace spices, both derived from respectively the seed and aril of Myristica fragrans, a tree native to the Moluccas. A hallucinogenic snuff (containing a derivative of tryptamine) that is used by certain Amazonian tribes is obtained from the bark of Virola elongata and other closely related species. The wood of some Asian and American species has local commercial use, as is the case of Otoba parvifolia in South America.

== Toxicity ==
Essential oils of Myristicaceae have antifungal action and antimicrobial activity against Streptococcus mutans. Myristicaceae is reputed to be a strong deliriant. The dark-red resin of the tree bark in some genera, such as Virola, contains several hallucinogenic alkaloids; Myristicin poisoning can induce convulsions, palpitations, nausea, eventual dehydration, generalized body pain, and death.

== Fossil record ==
A fossil seed of †Myristicacarpum chandlerae from the early Eocene London Clay flora of southern England is the earliest record of Myristicaceae.
