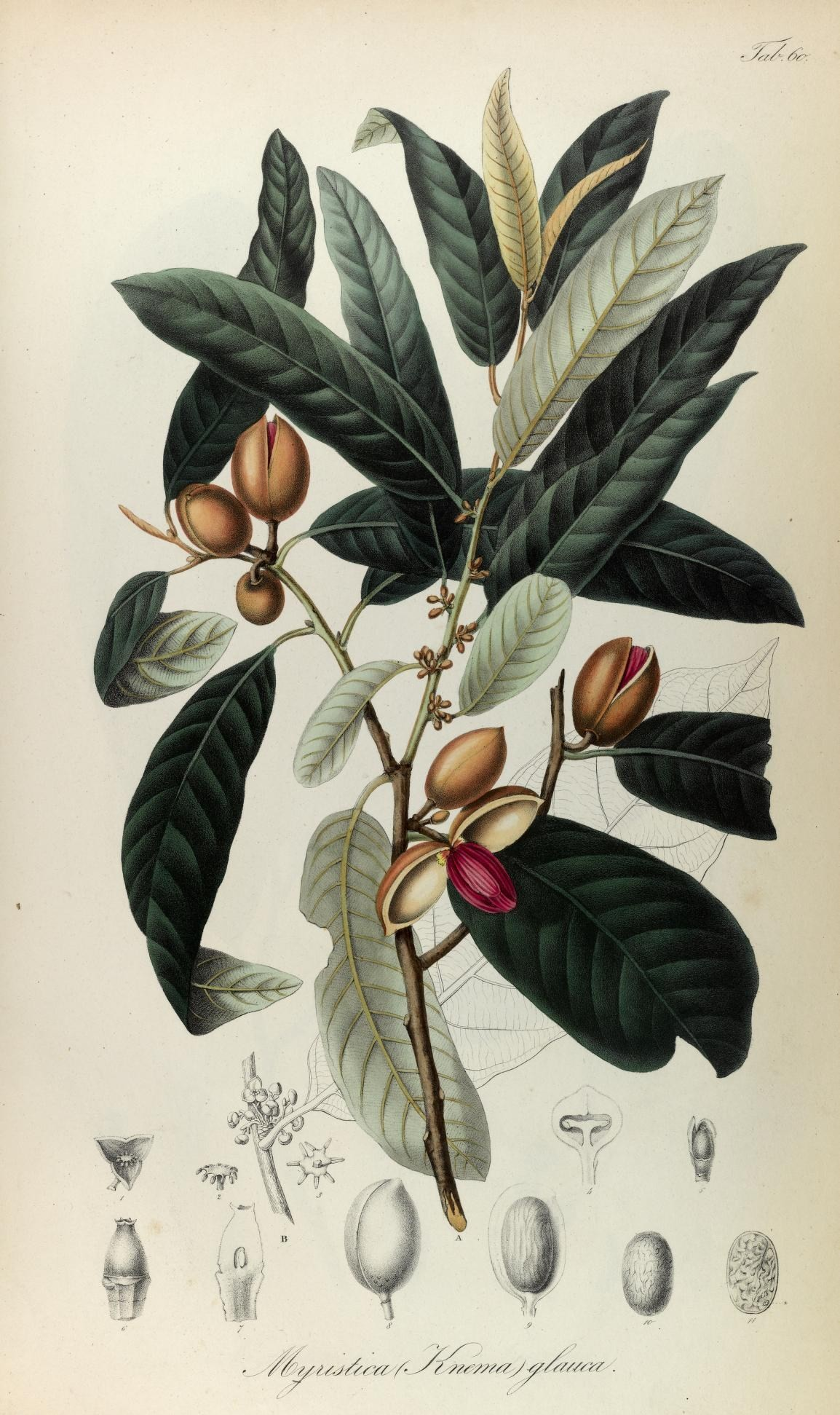
- Botanical illustration of Knema glauca

Scientific classification
- Kingdom: Plantae
- Clade: Tracheophytes
- Clade: Angiosperms
- Clade: Magnoliids
- Order: Magnoliales
- Family: Myristicaceae
- Genus: Knema; Lour.

= Knema =

Genus of trees

Knema is a genus of plant in family Myristicaceae, mostly consisting of small-medium trees found in lowland tropical forests from south and northeast of India, Indochina, Malay Archipelago to near the tip of New Guinea. The highest diversity of species is in Borneo in west of Malesia.

== Species ==
As of November 2026, 97 species are accepted:

- Knema alvarezii Merr.
- Knema andamanica (Warb.) W.J.de Wilde
- Knema angustifolia (Roxb.) Warb.
- Knema ashtonii J.Sinclair
- Knema attenuata (Wall. ex Hook.f. & Thomson) Warb.
- Knema austrosiamensis W.J.de Wilde
- Knema bengalensis W.J.de Wilde
- Knema casearioides (Kosterm.) W.J.de Wilde
- Knema celebica W.J.de Wilde
- Knema cinerea (Poir.) Warb.
- Knema communis J.Sinclair
- Knema conferta (King) Warb.
- Knema conica W.J.de Wilde
- Knema corticosa Lour. (synonym Knema globularia (Lam.) Warb.)
- Knema curtisii (King) Warb.
- Knema elegans Warb.
- Knema elmeri Merr.
- Knema emmae W.J.de Wilde
- Knema erratica (Hook.f. & Thomson) J.Sinclair
- Knema flavostamina M.G.Govind & Dan
- Knema furfuracea (Hook.f. & Thomson) Warb.
- Knema galeata J.Sinclair
- Knema glauca (Blume) Warb.
- Knema glaucescens Jack
- Knema globulatericia W.J.de Wilde
- Knema glomerata (Blanco) Merr.
- Knema hirtella W.J.de Wilde
- Knema hookeriana (Wall. ex Hook.f. & Thomson) Warb.
- Knema intermedia (Blume) Warb.
- Knema kinabaluensis J.Sinclair
- Knema korthalsii Warb.
- Knema kostermansiana W.J.de Wilde
- Knema krusemaniana W.J.de Wilde
- Knema kunstleri (King) Warb.
- Knema lamellaria W.J.de Wilde
- Knema lampongensis W.J.de Wilde
- Knema latericia Elmer
- Knema latifolia Warb.
- Knema laurina (Blume) Warb.
- Knema lenta Warb.
- Knema linguiformis (J.Sinclair) W.J.de Wilde
- Knema longepilosa (W.J.de Wilde) W.J.de Wilde
- Knema losirensis W.J.de Wilde
- Knema lunduensis (J.Sinclair) W.J.de Wilde
- Knema luteola W.J.de Wilde
- Knema malayana Warb.
- Knema mamillata W.J.de Wilde
- Knema mandaharan (Miq.) Warb.
- Knema matanensis W.J.de Wilde
- Knema membranifolia H.J.P.Winkl.
- Knema minima W.J.de Wilde
- Knema mixta W.J.de Wilde
- Knema mogeana W.J.de Wilde
- Knema muscosa J.Sinclair
- Knema namkadingensis Phengmala, Soulad. & Tagane
- Knema oblongata Merr.
- Knema oblongifolia (King) Warb.
- Knema pachycarpa (King) Warb.
- Knema pallens W.J.de Wilde
- Knema patentinervia (J.Sinclair) W.J.de Wilde
- Knema pectinata Warb.
- Knema pedicellata (King) Warb.
- Knema percoriacea J.Sinclair
- Knema pierrei Warb.
- Knema piriformis W.J.de Wilde
- Knema plumulosa J.Sinclair
- Knema poilanei W.J.de Wilde
- Knema pseudolaurina W.J.de Wilde
- Knema psilantha W.J.de Wilde
- Knema pubiflora W.J.de Wilde
- Knema pulchra (Miq.) Warb.
- Knema retusa (King) Warb.
- Knema riangensis W.J.de Wilde
- Knema ridsdaleana W.J.de Wilde
- Knema rigidifolia J.Sinclair
- Knema rubens (J.Sinclair) W.J.de Wilde
- Knema rufa Warb.
- Knema saxatilis W.J.de Wilde
- Knema scortechinii (King) J.Sinclair
- Knema sericea W.J.de Wilde
- Knema sessiflora W.J.de Wilde
- Knema squamulosa W.J.de Wilde
- Knema steenisii W.J.de Wilde
- Knema stellata Merr.
- Knema stenocarpa Warb.
- Knema stenophylla (Warb.) J.Sinclair
- Knema stylosa (W.J.de Wilde) W.J.de Wilde
- Knema subhirtella W.J.de Wilde
- Knema sumatrana (Blume) W.J.de Wilde
- Knema tenuinervia W.J.de Wilde
- Knema tomentella (Miq.) Warb.
- Knema tonkinensis (Warb.) W.J.de Wilde
- Knema tridactyla Airy Shaw
- Knema uliginosa J.Sinclair
- Knema viridis W.J.de Wilde
- Knema woodii J.Sinclair
