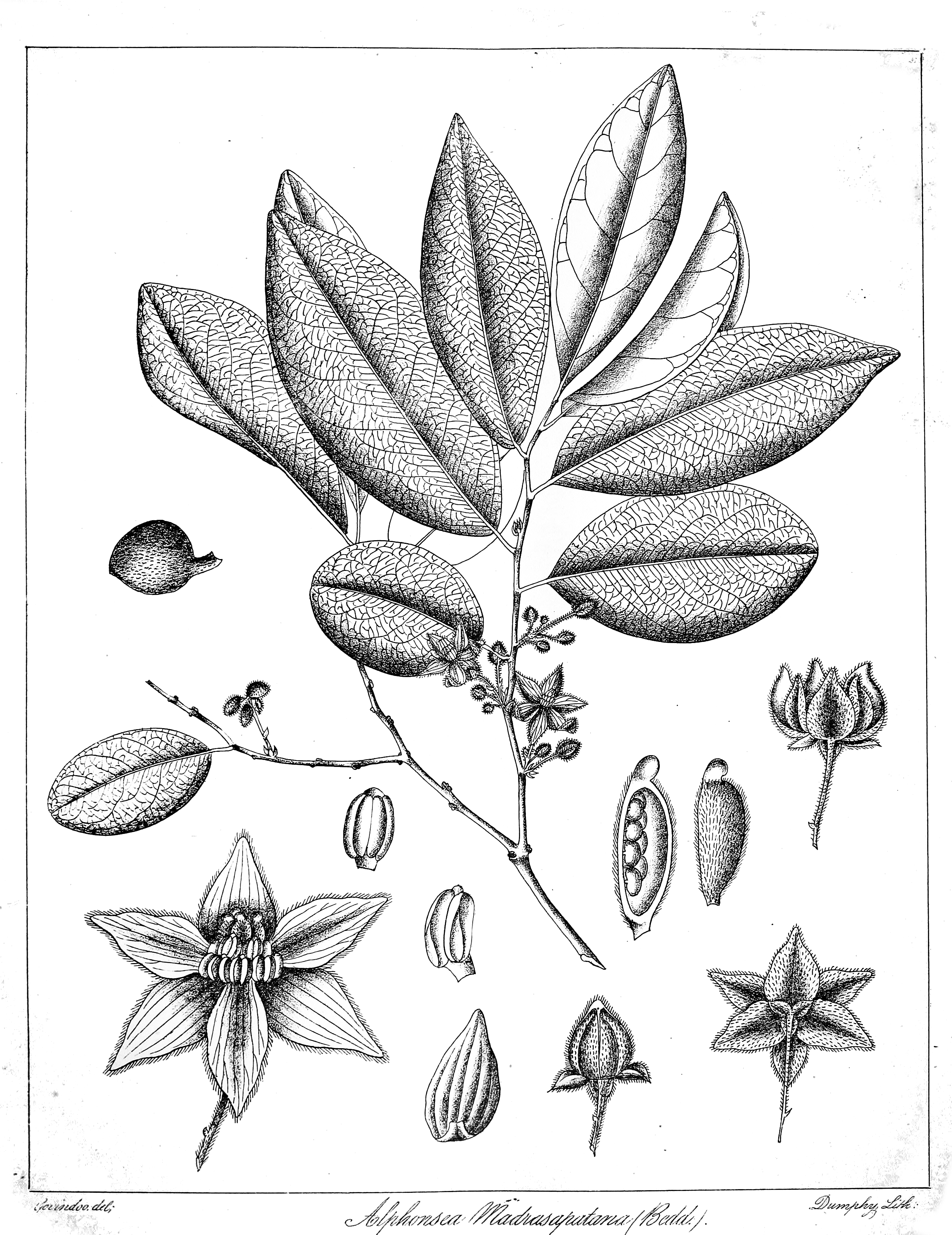
- Alphonsea lutea (as Alphonsea madraspatana)

Scientific classification
- Kingdom: Plantae
- Clade: Tracheophytes
- Clade: Angiosperms
- Clade: Magnoliids
- Order: Magnoliales
- Family: Annonaceae
- Tribe: Miliuseae
- Genus: Alphonsea; Hook.f. & Thomson

= Alphonsea =

Genus of flowering plants

Alphonsea is a genus of flowering plants in the family Annonaceae. Its species are native to subtropical and tropical regions of Asia, from southern China and the Indian Subcontinent to Indochina, Malesia, and New Guinea.

The genus was described by Joseph Dalton Hooker and Thomas Thomson in 1955. It is named after Swiss botanist Alphonse L.P.P. de Candolle.

== Species ==
As of March 2026, Plants of the World Online accepts 39 species:

- Alphonsea annulata Leerat. & Chalermglin – Tam Yao Si Khit
- Alphonsea boniana Finet & Gagnep.
- Alphonsea borneensis I.M.Turner
- Alphonsea curtisii King
- Alphonsea cylindrica King
- Alphonsea elliptica Hook.f. & Thomson
- Alphonsea gaudichaudiana (Baill.) Finet & Gagnep.
- Alphonsea glandulosa Y.H.Tan & B.Xue
- Alphonsea hainanensis Merr. & Chun
- Alphonsea havilandii P.J.A.Kessler
- Alphonsea hortensis H.Huber
- Alphonsea isthmicola I.M.Turner & Utteridge
- Alphonsea javanica Scheff.
- Alphonsea johorensis J.Sinclair
- Alphonsea keithii Ridl.
- Alphonsea kinabaluensis J.Sinclair
- Alphonsea kingii J.Sinclair
- Alphonsea longicarpa Leerat. & Chalermglin
- Alphonsea lucida King
- Alphonsea lutea (Roxb.) Hook.f. & Thomson (synonym Alphonsea sclerocarpa Thwaites)
- Alphonsea maingayi Hook.f. & Thomson
- Alphonsea malayana P.J.A.Kessler
- Alphonsea mollis Dunn
- Alphonsea monogyna Merr. & Chun
- Alphonsea orthopetala H.Okada
- Alphonsea ovata (Scheff.) J.Sinclair
- Alphonsea pallida Craib
- Alphonsea papuasica Diels
- Alphonsea philastreana (Pierre) Pierre ex Finet & Gagnep.
- Alphonsea phuwuaensis Leerat. & Chalermglin
- Alphonsea rugosa I.M.Turner & Utteridge
- Alphonsea siamensis P.J.A.Kessler
- Alphonsea sonlaensis Bân
- Alphonsea stenogyna (Diels) J.Sinclair
- Alphonsea tonquinensis A.DC.
- Alphonsea tsangyanensis P.T.Li
- Alphonsea ventricosa (Roxb.) Hook.f. & Thomson
- Alphonsea yunnanensis (P.T.Li) Y.H.Tan & B.Yang bis
- Alphonsea zeylanica Hook.f. & Thomson
