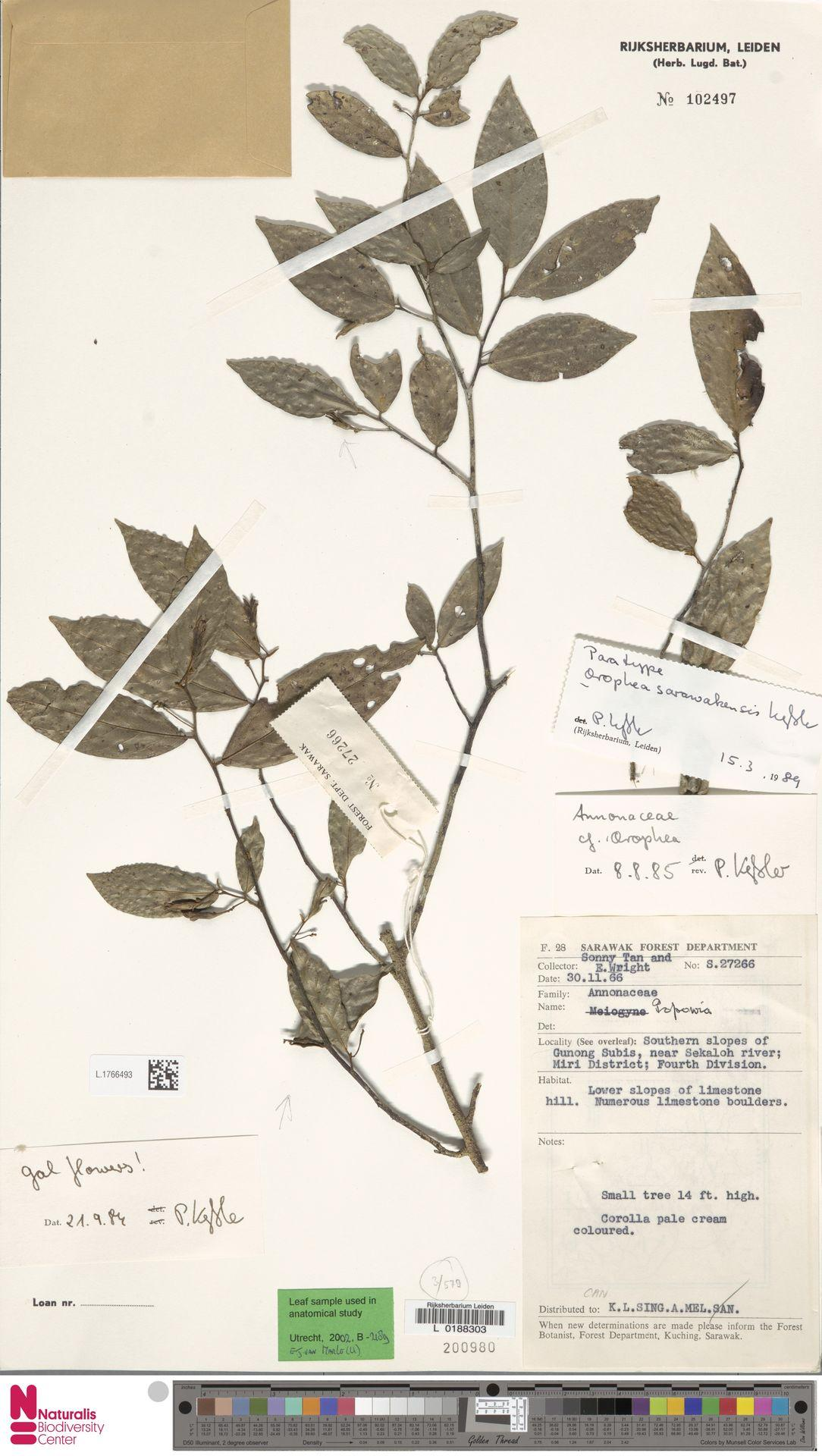

Scientific classification
- Kingdom: Plantae
- Clade: Tracheophytes
- Clade: Angiosperms
- Clade: Magnoliids
- Order: Magnoliales
- Family: Annonaceae
- Genus: Orophea
- Species: O. sarawakensis

Binomial name
- Orophea sarawakensis Kessler

= Orophea sarawakensis =

Species of tree

Orophea sarawakensis is a species of tree in the genus Orophea that is endemic in Borneo. It grows on wet tropical biomes. Its conservation status is Threatened.

== Description ==
The type specimen were collected near Gunong Subis, Borneo.

Orophea sarawakensis is a small tree growing 4–8 meters tall. Young twigs are pubescent but soon become glabrescent. The leaves are oblong to elliptic, membranaceous, measuring 4–6(–9) cm long and 1.5–2(–3) cm wide; they are glabrous except along the midrib and lateral veins, with a shortly subacute acuminate tip and an acute base. The midrib is grooved above and prominent beneath, with 5–7 pairs of lateral veins that curve upward and interconnect about 2 mm before the margin, and are sparsely hirsute. The petiole is about 1 mm long and 1 mm thick. The inflorescence is axillary or supra-axillary, solitary, about 1.5 cm long, and bears 1 or 2 flowers, with a peduncle about 1 cm long and a pedicel about 0.5 cm long. The small flowers are ivory-colored, about 0.5 cm in diameter. The sepals are triangular-ovate, 2 mm long and wide. The outer petals are similar to the sepals, about 3 mm long and 4.5 mm wide, while the inner petals are diamond-shaped with a claw, the lamina is about 6.5 mm long and 4.5 mm wide, glabrous inside, with two nectaries located at the top of the lamina parallel to the margins. There are 6 stamens and 6 staminodes, which are cylindrical and rounded. The 6 carpels are hirsute, each containing 2 ovules with a sessile stigma. Ripe fruitlets are unknown.

== Taxonomy and Naming ==
It was described in 1990 by Paul J.A. Kessler in Blumea 34, from specimens collected by Sonny Tan, E. Wright. and Yii Puan Ching. It got its epithet from the type locality.

== Distribution and Habitat ==
It is endemic in Borneo. It grows on wet tropical biomes. It tends to grow in low elevations on limestone hills.

== Conservation ==
This species is assessed as Threatened, in a preliminary report.
