= Dendrokingstonia nervosa =

Conservation status
- Near Threatened (IUCN 3.1)

Scientific classification
- Kingdom: Plantae
- Clade: Embryophytes
- Clade: Tracheophytes
- Clade: Spermatophytes
- Clade: Angiosperms
- Clade: Magnoliids
- Order: Magnoliales
- Family: Annonaceae
- Genus: Dendrokingstonia
- Species: D. nervosa

Binomial name
- Dendrokingstonia nervosa Hook.f. & Thomson

Synonyms
- Bocagea nervosa (Hook.f. & Thomson) Pierre; Kingstonia nervosa Hook.f. & Thomson

Species of flowering plant

Dendrokingstonia nervosa is a species of flowering plant in the Annonaceae family. It is a tree endemic to the Malay Peninsula (Peninsular Malaysia and Singapore). It was first described as Kinstonia nervosa by Joseph Hooker and Thomas Thomson in 1872, and placed in genus Dendrokingstonia by Rauschert in 1982.
