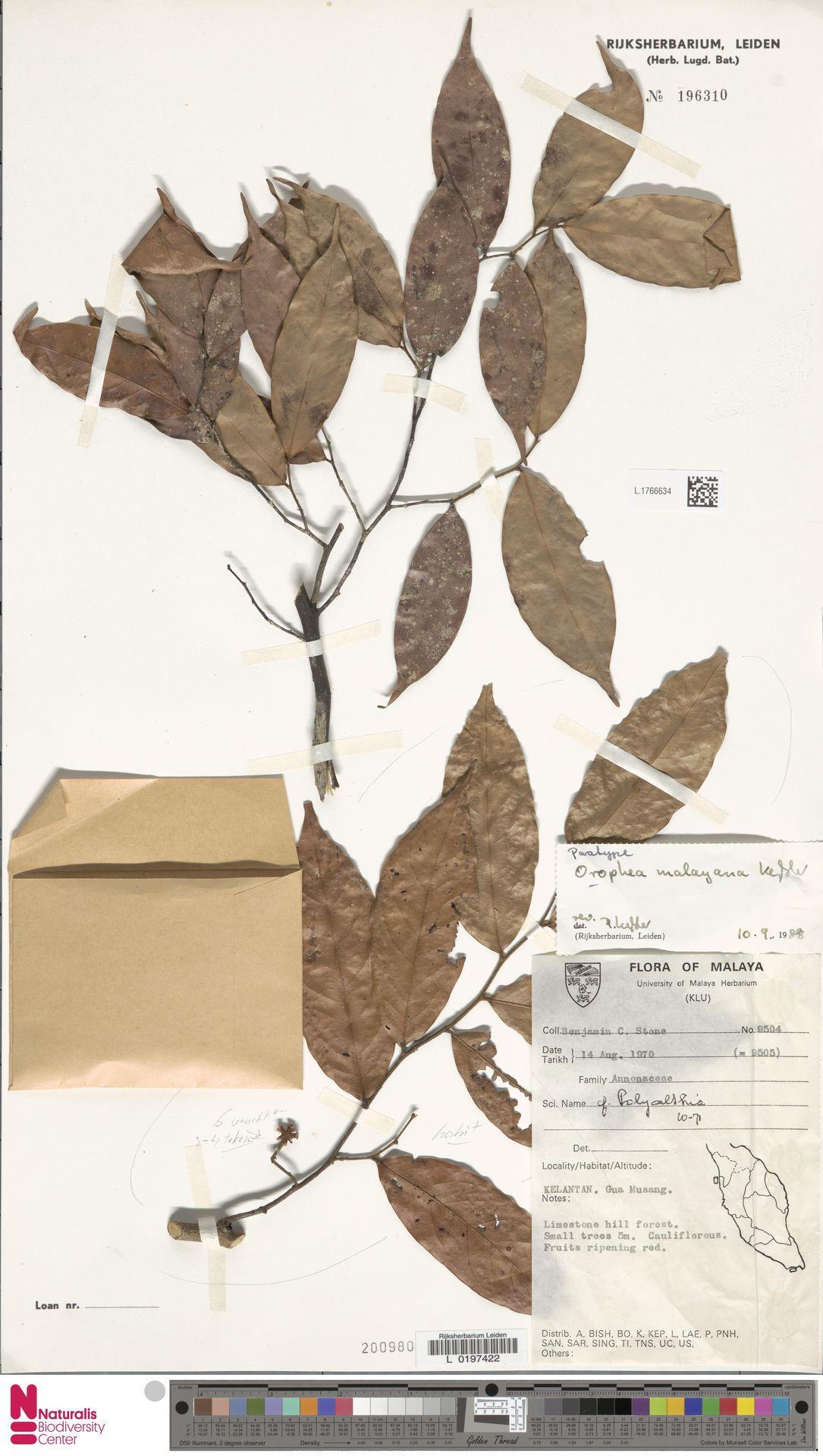

Scientific classification
- Kingdom: Plantae
- Clade: Tracheophytes
- Clade: Angiosperms
- Clade: Magnoliids
- Order: Magnoliales
- Family: Annonaceae
- Genus: Orophea
- Species: O. malayana

Binomial name
- Orophea malayana Kessler

= Orophea malayana =

Species of tree

Orophea malayana is a species of tree in the genus Orophea that is endemic in Borneo. It grows on wet tropical biomes. Its conservation status is Threatened.

== Description ==
The type specimen were collected near Gunong Pondok, Borneo.

Orophea malayana is a small tree growing 5–8 meters tall, with young twigs that are initially pubescent but soon become glabrous. The leaves are oblong to elliptic, glabrous, and chartaceous, measuring 8–13 cm long and 2.5–5 cm wide; they have a long-acuminate tip, an acute base, and a midrib that is grooved above and prominent beneath, with 8–10 pairs of lateral veins that curve upward and interconnect about 2 mm before the margin, while the petiole is about 2 mm long and 1 mm thick. The inflorescence is axillary, solitary, and bears 1 or 2 flowers, with a peduncle about 1.3 cm long and a pedicel about 1 cm long. The small green flowers are about 4 mm in diameter; the sepals are ovate, persistent, and about 1.5 mm long and wide, the outer petals are similar in size at 3 mm long and 2 mm wide, while the inner petals are rhombic with a claw, about 8 mm long and 4 mm wide, and glabrous inside except along the margins. There are 2 vertical nectaries, 12 stamens with no staminodes, and 6 glabrous carpels each containing 2 ovules with a sessile stigma. The 6 fruitlets are globose, glabrous, and about 1 cm in diameter, each containing 2 semiglobose seeds.

== Taxonomy and Naming ==
It was described in 1990 by Paul J.A. Kessler in Blumea 34, from specimens collected by Ng. It got its epithet from the type locality.

== Distribution and Habitat ==
It is endemic in Borneo. It grows on wet tropical biomes.

== Conservation ==
This species is assessed as Threatened, in a preliminary report.
