= Knema plumulosa =

Conservation status
- Vulnerable (IUCN 2.3)

Scientific classification
- Kingdom: Plantae
- Clade: Embryophytes
- Clade: Tracheophytes
- Clade: Spermatophytes
- Clade: Angiosperms
- Clade: Magnoliids
- Order: Magnoliales
- Family: Myristicaceae
- Genus: Knema
- Species: K. plumulosa

Binomial name
- Knema plumulosa J.Sinclair

Species of flowering plant

Knema plumulosa is a species of flowering plant in the family Myristicaceae. It is a tree endemic to Peninsular Malaysia. It is threatened by habitat loss.
