= Alphonsea maingayi =

Conservation status
- Least Concern (IUCN 3.1)

Scientific classification
- Kingdom: Plantae
- Clade: Embryophytes
- Clade: Tracheophytes
- Clade: Spermatophytes
- Clade: Angiosperms
- Clade: Magnoliids
- Order: Magnoliales
- Family: Annonaceae
- Genus: Alphonsea
- Species: A. maingayi

Binomial name
- Alphonsea maingayi Hook.f. & Thomson

Species of flowering plant

Alphonsea maingayi is a species of flowering plant in the Annonaceae family. It native to Peninsular Malaysia and possibly Singapore.

== Description ==
Alphonsea maingayi is a middling to tall tree, whose branches are black. It has elliptic/oblong/lanceolate leaves which are shiny on the upper surface and whose lower surface has a dense covering of rusty, short, soft hairs.

== Taxonomy & naming ==
It was first described in 1872 by Joseph Dalton Hooker and Thomas Thomson. The specific epithet, maingayi, honours the botanist, Alexander Carroll Maingay.
