= Orophea uniflora =

Conservation status
- Near Threatened (IUCN 3.1)

Scientific classification
- Kingdom: Plantae
- Clade: Embryophytes
- Clade: Tracheophytes
- Clade: Spermatophytes
- Clade: Angiosperms
- Clade: Magnoliids
- Order: Magnoliales
- Family: Annonaceae
- Genus: Orophea
- Species: O. uniflora

Binomial name
- Orophea uniflora Hook.f. & Thomson

Species of flowering plant

Orophea uniflora is a species of flowering plant in the Annonaceae family. It is a tree endemic to the southern Western Ghats of southwestern India. It is threatened by habitat loss.
