= Knema muscosa =

Conservation status
- Vulnerable (IUCN 2.3)

Scientific classification
- Kingdom: Plantae
- Clade: Embryophytes
- Clade: Tracheophytes
- Clade: Spermatophytes
- Clade: Angiosperms
- Clade: Magnoliids
- Order: Magnoliales
- Family: Myristicaceae
- Genus: Knema
- Species: K. muscosa

Binomial name
- Knema muscosa J.Sinclair

Species of tree

Knema muscosa is a species of flowering plant in the family Myristicaceae. It is a tree endemic to Borneo where it is confined to Sarawak.

The species was described by James Sinclair in 1961.
