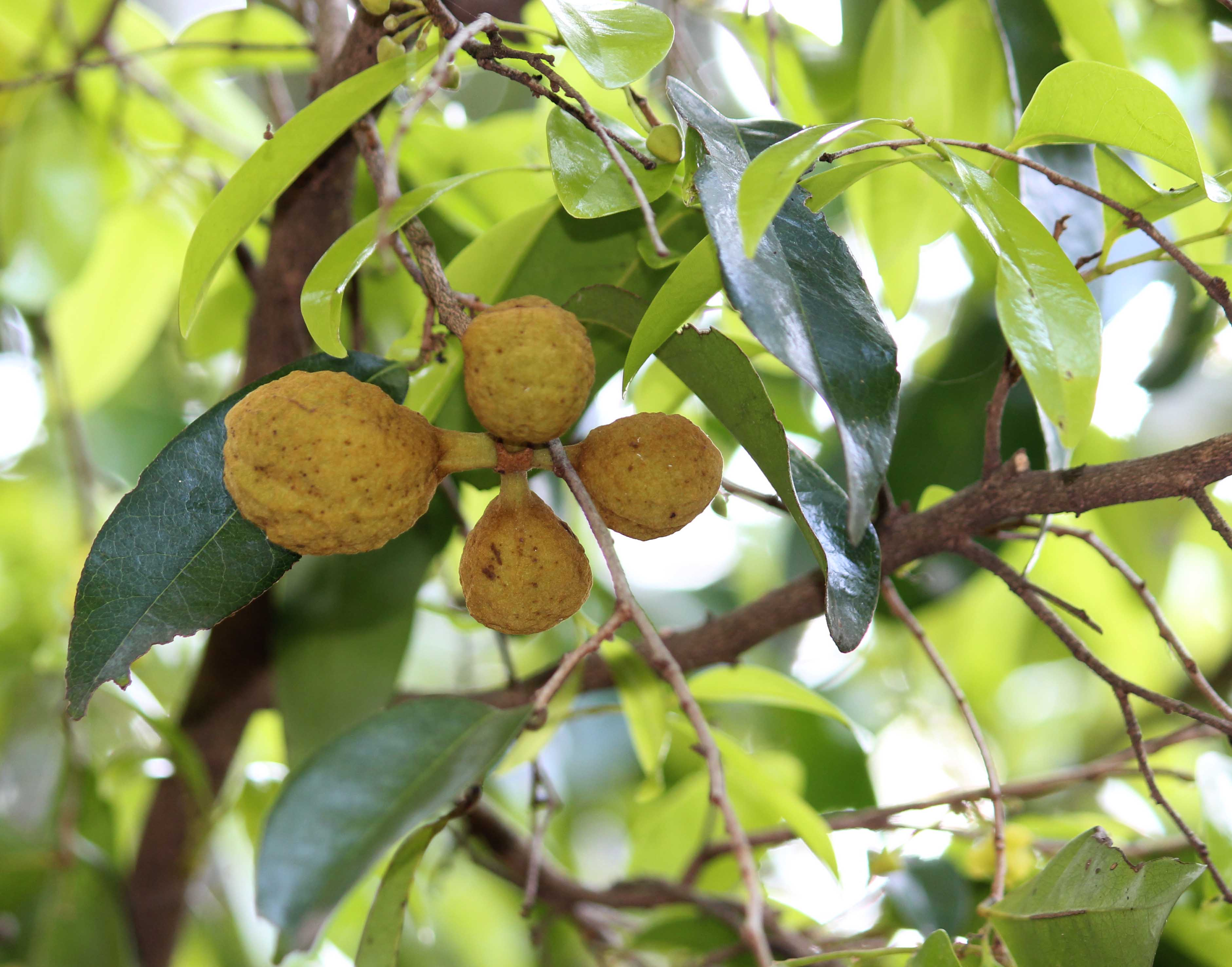

Conservation status
- Least Concern (IUCN 3.1)

Scientific classification
- Kingdom: Plantae
- Clade: Tracheophytes
- Clade: Angiosperms
- Clade: Magnoliids
- Order: Magnoliales
- Family: Annonaceae
- Genus: Alphonsea
- Species: A. lutea

Binomial name
- Alphonsea lutea (Roxb.) Hook.f. & Thomson

Synonyms
- Alphonsea madraspatana Bedd.; Alphonsea sclerocarpa Thwaites; Bocagea lutea Baill.; Uvaria lutea Roxb. (1795) (basionym); Uvaria montana Dunal ex Wall.; Uvaria russelii Wall.

= Alphonsea lutea =

Species of flowering plant

Alphonsea lutea is a species of flowering plant in the Annonaceae family. It is a shrub or tree native to southern and eastern India, Bangladesh, Myanmar, and Sri Lanka. It is known by several local names, including Pulusu mamidi in Telugu and തുട്ട in Malayalam. It grows in tropical moist lowland forests.

The species was first described as Uvaria lutea by William Roxburgh in 1795. In 1855 Joseph Dalton Hooker and Thomas Thomson placed the species in genus Alphonsea as A. lutea.

== Description ==
Alphonsea lutea is small tree up to 6 meters tall. Leaves are simple and alternate. The flowers are in axillary peduncles, and the fruit consists of aggregated subglobose berries, typically containing more than two seeds. It flowers from March to October.
