= Knema rubens =

Conservation status
- Least Concern (IUCN 3.1)

Scientific classification
- Kingdom: Plantae
- Clade: Embryophytes
- Clade: Tracheophytes
- Clade: Spermatophytes
- Clade: Angiosperms
- Clade: Magnoliids
- Order: Magnoliales
- Family: Myristicaceae
- Genus: Knema
- Species: K. rubens

Binomial name
- Knema rubens (J.Sinclair) W.J.de Wilde

Synonyms
- Knema cinerea var. rubens (J.Sinclair) J.Sinclair; Knema glaucescens f. rubens J.Sinclair

Species of tree

Knema rubens is a species of flowering plant in the family Myristicaceae. It is a tree native to Peninsular Malaysia, Singapore, and Sumatra.
