= Knema hookeriana =

Conservation status
- Vulnerable (IUCN 2.3)

Scientific classification
- Kingdom: Plantae
- Clade: Embryophytes
- Clade: Tracheophytes
- Clade: Spermatophytes
- Clade: Angiosperms
- Clade: Magnoliids
- Order: Magnoliales
- Family: Myristicaceae
- Genus: Knema
- Species: K. hookeriana

Binomial name
- Knema hookeriana (Wall. ex Hook.f. & Thomson) Warb.

Synonyms
- Myristica hookeriana Wall. ex Hook.f. & Thomson; Palala hookeriana (Wall. ex Hook.f. & Thomson) Kuntze

Species of tree

Knema hookeriana (sometimes misspelled K. hookerana) is a species of flowering plant in the family Myristicaceae. It is a tree native to Peninsular Malaysia, Singapore, Sumatra, and Peninsular Thailand.

The Latin specific epithet hookeriana refers to William Jackson Hooker.
