= Knema uliginosa =

Conservation status
- Critically Endangered (IUCN 3.1)

Scientific classification
- Kingdom: Plantae
- Clade: Embryophytes
- Clade: Tracheophytes
- Clade: Spermatophytes
- Clade: Angiosperms
- Clade: Magnoliids
- Order: Magnoliales
- Family: Myristicaceae
- Genus: Knema
- Species: K. uliginosa

Binomial name
- Knema uliginosa J.Sinclair

Species of flowering plant

Knema uliginosa is a species of flowering plant in the family Myristicaceae. It is a shrub or tree endemic to Sarawak and Kalimantan in Borneo.
