= K. intermedia =

K. intermedia may refer to:

- Kerivoula intermedia, the small woolly bat, a bat species found only in Malaysia
- Knema intermedia, a plant species found in Indonesia, Malaysia and Singapore

== See also ==
- Intermedia (disambiguation)
