= K. communis =

K. communis may refer to:

- Kerria communis, a scale insect species in the genus Kerria
- Knema communis, a plant species found in Malaysia and Singapore

== See also ==
- Communis (disambiguation)
