= Knema linguiformis =

Conservation status
- Least Concern (IUCN 3.1)

Scientific classification
- Kingdom: Plantae
- Clade: Embryophytes
- Clade: Tracheophytes
- Clade: Spermatophytes
- Clade: Angiosperms
- Clade: Magnoliids
- Order: Magnoliales
- Family: Myristicaceae
- Genus: Knema
- Species: K. linguiformis

Binomial name
- Knema linguiformis (J.Sinclair) W.J.de Wilde

Synonyms
- Knema curtisii var. linguiformis J.Sinclair

Species of tree

Knema linguiformis is a species of flowering plant in the family Myristicaceae. It is a tree endemic to Borneo.

The taxon was first described as Knema curtisii var. linguiformis by James Sinclair in 1961. In 1979 W. J. de Wilde designated it a distinct species, K. linguiformis.
