= Knema furfuracea =

Conservation status
- Least Concern (IUCN 3.1)

Scientific classification
- Kingdom: Plantae
- Clade: Embryophytes
- Clade: Tracheophytes
- Clade: Spermatophytes
- Clade: Angiosperms
- Clade: Magnoliids
- Order: Magnoliales
- Family: Myristicaceae
- Genus: Knema
- Species: K. furfuracea

Binomial name
- Knema furfuracea (Hook.f. & Thomson) Warb.

Synonyms
- Knema glaucescens Wall.; Myristica furfuracea Hook.f. & Thomson (1855); Palala furfuracea (Hook.f. & Thomson) Kuntze; Myristica furfuracea var. major King; Myristica knema Steud.; Myristica longifolia Hook.f. & Thomson

Species of tree

Knema furfuracea is a species of flowering plant in the family Myristicaceae. It is a tree native to Peninsular Malaysia, Singapore, Sumatra, and southern Peninsular Thailand.

The species was first described as Myristica furfuracea by Joseph Dalton Hooker and Thomas Thomson in 1855. In 1897 Otto Warburg placed the species in genus Knema as K. furfuracea.
