= Alphonsea kingii =

Conservation status
- Critically Endangered (IUCN 3.1)

Scientific classification
- Kingdom: Plantae
- Clade: Embryophytes
- Clade: Tracheophytes
- Clade: Spermatophytes
- Clade: Angiosperms
- Clade: Magnoliids
- Order: Magnoliales
- Family: Annonaceae
- Genus: Alphonsea
- Species: A. kingii

Binomial name
- Alphonsea kingii J.Sinclair

Species of flowering plant

Alphonsea kingii is a species of flowering plant in the Annonaceae family. It is a shrub or tree endemic to Peninsular Malaysia. It is threatened by habitat loss.
