= Alphonsea zeylanica =

Conservation status
- Vulnerable (IUCN 3.1)

Scientific classification
- Kingdom: Plantae
- Clade: Tracheophytes
- Clade: Angiosperms
- Clade: Magnoliids
- Order: Magnoliales
- Family: Annonaceae
- Genus: Alphonsea
- Species: A. zeylanica

Binomial name
- Alphonsea zeylanica Hook.f. & Thomson

Species of flowering plant

Alphonsea zeylanica is a species of plant in the Annonaceae family. It is endemic to Sri Lanka.

== Trunk ==
Bark - smooth, gray.

== Flowers ==
Inflorescence - sessile, pubescent.
