= Knema kinabaluensis =

Conservation status
- Least Concern (IUCN 3.1)

Scientific classification
- Kingdom: Plantae
- Clade: Tracheophytes
- Clade: Angiosperms
- Clade: Magnoliids
- Order: Magnoliales
- Family: Myristicaceae
- Genus: Knema
- Species: K. kinabaluensis

Binomial name
- Knema kinabaluensis J.Sinclair

Species of tree

Knema kinabaluensis is a species of plant in the family Myristicaceae. It is endemic to Borneo where it is confined to Sabah. It grows in montane rain forest from 1,000 to 2,300 metres elevation.
