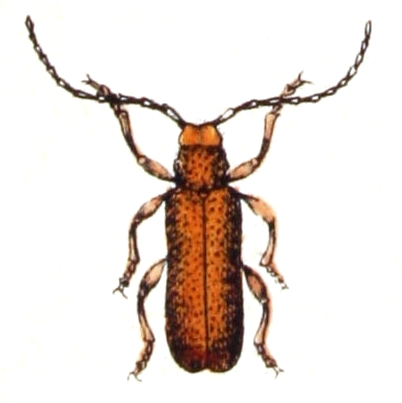

Scientific classification
- Kingdom: Animalia
- Phylum: Arthropoda
- Clade: Pancrustacea
- Class: Insecta
- Order: Coleoptera
- Suborder: Polyphaga
- Infraorder: Cucujiformia
- Family: Cerambycidae
- Genus: Anaesthetis
- Species: A. testacea

Binomial name
- Anaesthetis testacea (Fabricius, 1781)

= Anaesthetis testacea =

Species of beetle

Anaesthetis testacea is a species of longhorn beetle. It is a common species in Europe that develops in the dead, terminal twigs of deciduous trees and shrubs.
