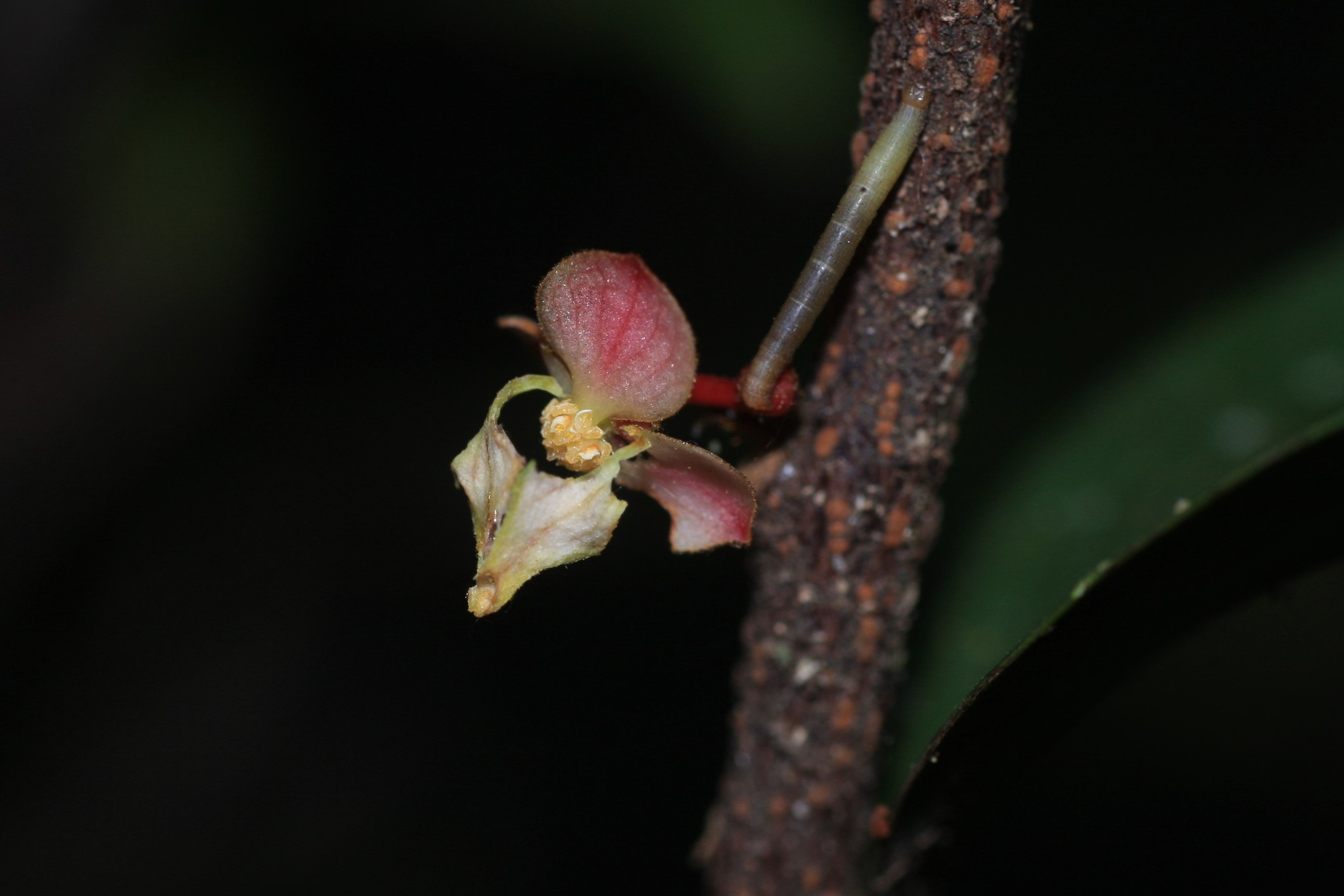
- Orophea thomsonii

Scientific classification
- Kingdom: Plantae
- Clade: Embryophytes
- Clade: Tracheophytes
- Clade: Spermatophytes
- Clade: Angiosperms
- Clade: Magnoliids
- Order: Magnoliales
- Family: Annonaceae
- Tribe: Miliuseae
- Genus: Orophea; Blume

Synonyms
- Mezzettiopsis Ridl.

= Orophea =

Genus of flowering plants

Orophea is a genus of flowering plants in the family Annonaceae. There are about 60 species, native to Asia.

These are trees and shrubs. The flowers have six petals in two whorls, the outer petals smaller than the inner. The inner petals are attached at the tips to form a cap shape.

== Species ==
As of June 2026, Plants of the World Online accepted these species:

- Orophea acuminata A.DC.
- Orophea alba Kessler
- Orophea brandisii Hook.f. & Thomson
- Orophea celebica (Blume) Zoll.
- Orophea chalermprakiat Damth., Chanthamrong & Chaowasku
- Orophea chlorantha Kessler
- Orophea chrysantha Kessler
- Orophea clemensiana Kessler
- Orophea corymbosa (Blume) Zoll.
- Orophea creaghii (Ridl.) Leonardía & Kessler
- Orophea cumingiana S.Vidal
- Orophea cuneiformis King
- Orophea desmos Pierre
- Orophea dodecandra Miq.
- Orophea dolichocarpa Merr.
- Orophea enneandra Blume
- Orophea enterocarpa Maingay ex Hook.f.
- Orophea erythrocarpa Bedd.
- Orophea flagellaris Kessler
- Orophea fusca Craib
- Orophea glabra Merr.
- Orophea hainanensis Merr.
- Orophea harmandiana Pierre
- Orophea hastata King
- Orophea hexandra Blume
- Orophea hirsuta King
- Orophea katschallica Kurz
- Orophea kerrii Kessler
- Orophea kingiana Leonardía & Kessler
- Orophea kostermansiana Kessler
- Orophea laotica Leonardía & Kessler
- Orophea laui Leonardía & Kessler
- Orophea leuseri Kessler
- Orophea leytensis Merr.
- Orophea maculata Scort. ex King
- Orophea malayana Kessler
- Orophea megalophylla Kessler
- Orophea merrillii Kessler
- Orophea monosperma Craib
- Orophea multiflora Jovet-Ast
- Orophea myriantha Merr.
- Orophea narasimhanii Karthig., Sumathi & Jayanthi
- Orophea nitida (Roxb. ex G.Don) Meade ex I.M.Turner
- Orophea parvifolia Merr.
- Orophea phouphamarnensis Kongx., Soulad. & Tagane
- Orophea polycarpa A.DC.
- Orophea rubra Kessler
- Orophea sagittalis H.Okada
- Orophea salacifolia Hutch.
- Orophea sarawakensis Kessler
- Orophea sericea Kessler
- Orophea siamensis Craib
- Orophea sichaikhanii Damth., Aongyong & Chaowasku
- Orophea sivarajanii Sasidh.
- Orophea thomsonii Bedd.
- Orophea thorelii Pierre
- Orophea tonkinensis Finet & Gagnep.
- Orophea torulosa Hutch.
- Orophea trigyna Miq.
- Orophea uniflora Hook.f. & Thomson
- Orophea wenzelii Merr.
- Orophea zeylanica Hook.f. & Thomson

=== Formerly placed here ===
Alphonsea yunnanensis (P.T.Li) Y.H.Tan & B.Yang bis (as Orophea yunnanensis P.T.Li)
