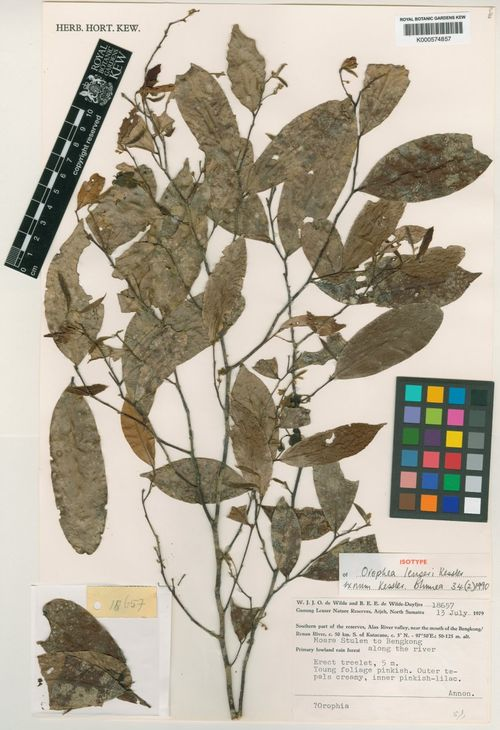

Scientific classification
- Kingdom: Plantae
- Clade: Embryophytes
- Clade: Tracheophytes
- Clade: Spermatophytes
- Clade: Angiosperms
- Clade: Magnoliids
- Order: Magnoliales
- Family: Annonaceae
- Genus: Orophea
- Species: O. leuseri

Binomial name
- Orophea leuseri Kessler

= Orophea leuseri =

Species of tree

Orophea leuseri is a species of tree in the genus Orophea that is endemic in Borneo. It grows on wet tropical biomes. Its conservation status is Threatened.

== Description ==
The type specimen were collected near Gunung Leuser, Aceh.

Orophea leuseri is a small tree growing 5 meters tall. Young twigs are pubescent but soon become glabrous. The leaves are oblong to elliptic, membranaceous (thin and membranous), measuring 3–10 cm long and 2–3.5 cm wide; they are glabrous except along the midrib and lateral veins, with a shortly acuminate tip and a cuneate (wedge-shaped) base. The midrib is grooved above and prominent beneath, with 8–10 pairs of lateral veins that curve upward and interconnect about 2 mm before the margin, and are slightly pubescent. The petiole is about 2 mm long and 1 mm thick. The inflorescence is supra-axillary (borne above the leaf axil), solitary, and 1-flowered, with a peduncle about 1 cm long. The flowers are about 1.2 cm in diameter; the outer petals (not tepals as indicated on the label) are described as creamy, while the inner are pinkish-lilac. The sepals are linear, 4 mm long and 2 mm wide. The outer petals are 2 in number, broadly ovate, 11 mm long and about 7 mm wide. The inner petals are small and rhombic (diamond-shaped) with a claw, about 19 mm long and 6 mm wide, glabrous inside except at the apex. There is 1 nectary, horizontal, with an undulating margin surrounded by black tissue. The flower has 6 stamens and 3 staminodes, which are semicircular. The 3 carpels are hirsute (hairy), each containing 6–8 ovules with a sessile stigma. Ripe fruitlets are unknown.

== Taxonomy and naming ==
It was described in 1990 by Paul J.A. Kessler in Blumea 34, from specimens collected by Willem Jan Jacobus Oswald de Wilde & Brigitta E.E. de Wilde-Duyfjes. It got its epithet from the type locality. The outer petals are described as creamy, while the inner petals are pinkish-lilac. This species resembles Orophea maculata in its recurved inner petal tips. The flower formula is identical to that of Orophea katschallica, but it differs by its recurved tips and the distinctive nectary, which has an undulating margin surrounded by black tissue.

== Distribution and habitat ==
It is endemic in Borneo. It grows on wet tropical biomes. It tends to grow in lowland rain forest, along stream.

== Conservation ==
This species is assessed as Threatened, in a preliminary report.
