= Knema scortechinii =

Conservation status
- Least Concern (IUCN 3.1)

Scientific classification
- Kingdom: Plantae
- Clade: Embryophytes
- Clade: Tracheophytes
- Clade: Spermatophytes
- Clade: Angiosperms
- Clade: Magnoliids
- Order: Magnoliales
- Family: Myristicaceae
- Genus: Knema
- Species: K. scortechinii

Binomial name
- Knema scortechinii (King) J.Sinclair

Synonyms
- Knema conferta var. scortechinii (King) Warb.; Myristica scortechinii King

Species of tree

Knema scortechinii is a species of flowering plant in the family Myristicaceae. It is a tree endemic to Peninsular Malaysia.
