= Anaesthetis confossicollis =

Scientific classification
- Domain: Eukaryota
- Kingdom: Animalia
- Phylum: Arthropoda
- Class: Insecta
- Order: Coleoptera
- Suborder: Polyphaga
- Infraorder: Cucujiformia
- Family: Cerambycidae
- Genus: Anaesthetis
- Species: A. confossicollis

Binomial name
- Anaesthetis confossicollis Baeckmann, 1903

Species of beetle

Anaesthetis confossicollis is a species of beetle in the family Cerambycidae. It was described by Baeckmann in 1903. It is known from Russia, China, Mongolia, Siberia and Japan.
