= Knema latifolia =

Conservation status
- Least Concern (IUCN 3.1)

Scientific classification
- Kingdom: Plantae
- Clade: Embryophytes
- Clade: Tracheophytes
- Clade: Spermatophytes
- Clade: Angiosperms
- Clade: Magnoliids
- Order: Magnoliales
- Family: Myristicaceae
- Genus: Knema
- Species: K. latifolia

Binomial name
- Knema latifolia Warb.

Synonyms
- Knema nitida Merr.; Knema umbellata Warb.; Knema winkleri Merr.; Myristica umbellata (Warb.) Boerl.

Species of tree

Knema latifolia is a species of flowering plant in the family Myristicaceae. It is a tree native to Sumatra and Borneo.
