= Knema alvarezii =

Conservation status
- Vulnerable (IUCN 3.1)

Scientific classification
- Kingdom: Plantae
- Clade: Embryophytes
- Clade: Tracheophytes
- Clade: Spermatophytes
- Clade: Angiosperms
- Clade: Magnoliids
- Order: Magnoliales
- Family: Myristicaceae
- Genus: Knema
- Species: K. alvarezii

Binomial name
- Knema alvarezii Merr.

Species of flowering plant

Knema alvarezii is a species of plant in the family Myristicaceae. It is a tree endemic to Luzon in the Philippines.
