= Knema glomerata =

Conservation status
- Least Concern (IUCN 3.1)

Scientific classification
- Kingdom: Plantae
- Clade: Embryophytes
- Clade: Tracheophytes
- Clade: Spermatophytes
- Clade: Angiosperms
- Clade: Magnoliids
- Order: Magnoliales
- Family: Myristicaceae
- Genus: Knema
- Species: K. glomerata

Binomial name
- Knema glomerata (Blanco) Merr.

Synonyms
- Sterculia decandra Blanco; Sterculia glomerata Blanco; Knema acuminata Merr.; Knema gitingensis Elmer; Knema heterophylla Warb.; Knema vidalii Warb.

Species of plant in the family Myristicaceae

Knema glomerata is a species of flowering plant in the family Myristicaceae. It is a tree found in Borneo (Sarawak), the Maluku Islands (Seram), and the Philippines.
