= Orophea hastata =

Conservation status
- Least Concern (IUCN 3.1)

Scientific classification
- Kingdom: Plantae
- Clade: Embryophytes
- Clade: Tracheophytes
- Clade: Spermatophytes
- Clade: Angiosperms
- Clade: Magnoliids
- Order: Magnoliales
- Family: Annonaceae
- Genus: Orophea
- Species: O. hastata

Binomial name
- Orophea hastata King

Species of flowering plant

Orophea hastata is a species of flowering plant in the family Annonaceae. It is found in Peninsular Malaysia and Singapore.
