= Anaesthetis flavipilis =

Scientific classification
- Domain: Eukaryota
- Kingdom: Animalia
- Phylum: Arthropoda
- Class: Insecta
- Order: Coleoptera
- Suborder: Polyphaga
- Infraorder: Cucujiformia
- Family: Cerambycidae
- Genus: Anaesthetis
- Species: A. flavipilis

Binomial name
- Anaesthetis flavipilis Baeckmann, 1903

Synonyms
- Mimosophronica strandiella (Breuning) Breuning, 1963

Species of beetle

Anaesthetis flavipilis is a species of beetle in the family Cerambycidae. It was described by Baeckmann in 1903. It is known from Kazakhstan, Russia, Siberia, and China.
