= Knema pedicellata =

Conservation status
- Near Threatened (IUCN 3.1)

Scientific classification
- Kingdom: Plantae
- Clade: Embryophytes
- Clade: Tracheophytes
- Clade: Spermatophytes
- Clade: Angiosperms
- Clade: Magnoliids
- Order: Magnoliales
- Family: Myristicaceae
- Genus: Knema
- Species: K. pedicellata

Binomial name
- Knema pedicellata W.J.de Wilde

Species of tree

Knema pedicellata is a species of flowering plant in the family Myristicaceae. It is a tree endemic to Borneo.
