= Anaesthetis lepida =

Scientific classification
- Domain: Eukaryota
- Kingdom: Animalia
- Phylum: Arthropoda
- Class: Insecta
- Order: Coleoptera
- Suborder: Polyphaga
- Infraorder: Cucujiformia
- Family: Cerambycidae
- Genus: Anaesthetis
- Species: A. lepida

Binomial name
- Anaesthetis lepida Germar, 1848

Species of beetle

Anaesthetis lepida is a species of beetle in the family Cerambycidae that was described by Ernst Friedrich Germar in 1848, and is known from Australia.
