= Knema celebica =

Conservation status
- Endangered (IUCN 3.1)

Scientific classification
- Kingdom: Plantae
- Clade: Embryophytes
- Clade: Tracheophytes
- Clade: Spermatophytes
- Clade: Angiosperms
- Clade: Magnoliids
- Order: Magnoliales
- Family: Myristicaceae
- Genus: Knema
- Species: K. celebica

Binomial name
- Knema celebica W.J.de Wilde

Species of tree

Knema celebica is a species of flowering plant in the family Myristicaceae. It is a tree endemic to Sulawesi in Indonesia.
