= Knema conica =

Conservation status
- Vulnerable (IUCN 2.3)

Scientific classification
- Kingdom: Plantae
- Clade: Embryophytes
- Clade: Tracheophytes
- Clade: Spermatophytes
- Clade: Angiosperms
- Clade: Magnoliids
- Order: Magnoliales
- Family: Myristicaceae
- Genus: Knema
- Species: K. conica

Binomial name
- Knema conica W.J.de Wilde

Species of tree

Knema conica is a species of flowering plant in the family Myristicaceae. It is a tree endemic to southeastern Thailand.
