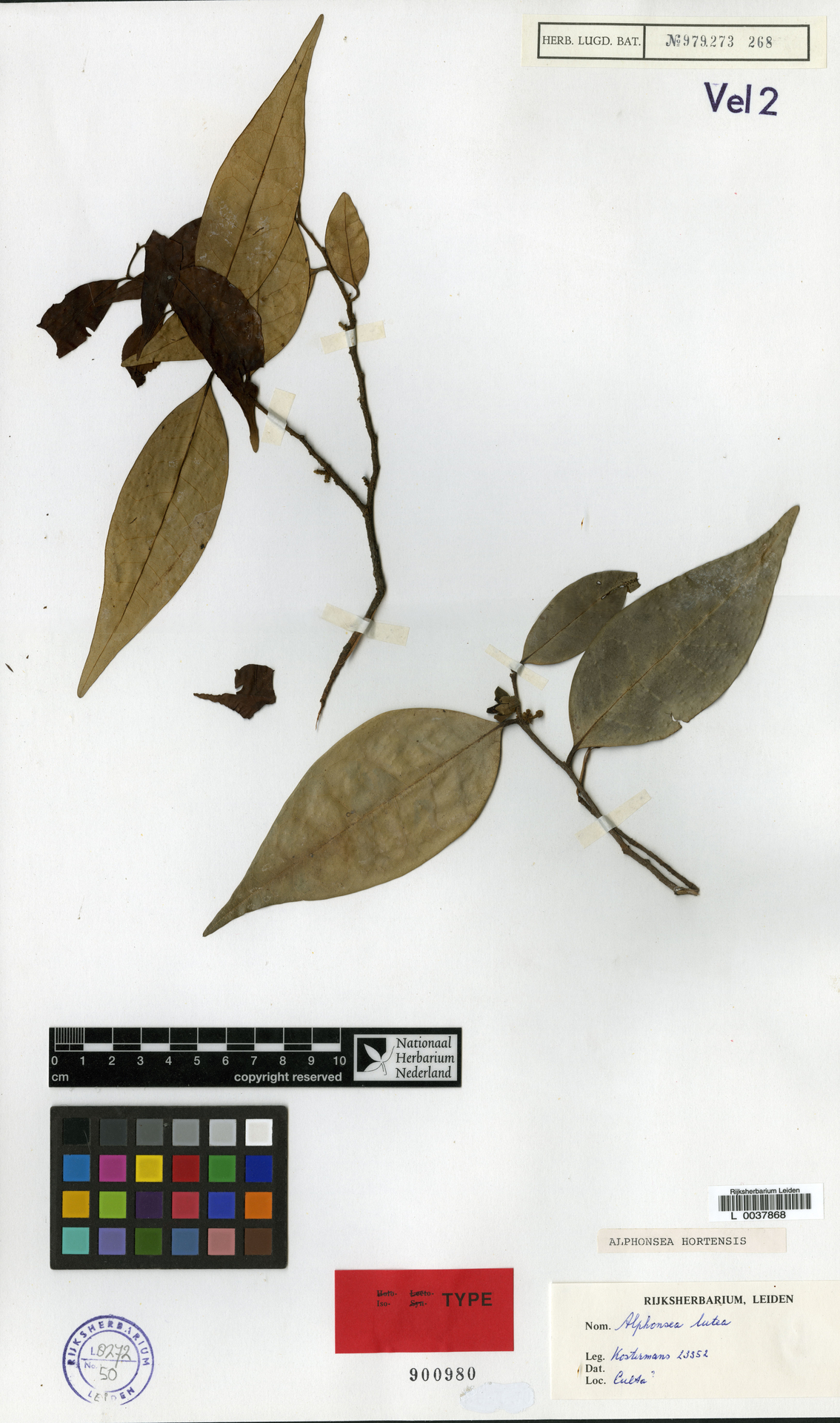

Conservation status
- Extinct in the Wild (IUCN 3.1)

Scientific classification
- Kingdom: Plantae
- Clade: Embryophytes
- Clade: Tracheophytes
- Clade: Angiosperms
- Clade: Magnoliids
- Order: Magnoliales
- Family: Annonaceae
- Genus: Alphonsea
- Species: A. hortensis

Binomial name
- Alphonsea hortensis H.Huber
- Distribution; Extinct

= Alphonsea hortensis =

Species of flowering plant

Alphonsea hortensis is a species of plant in the Annonaceae family. It is endemic to Sri Lanka. The plant is extinct in the wild, and can be only found in the Royal Botanical Gardens at Peradeniya.
