= Alphonsea hainanensis =

Conservation status
- Near Threatened (IUCN 3.1)

Scientific classification
- Kingdom: Plantae
- Clade: Tracheophytes
- Clade: Angiosperms
- Clade: Magnoliids
- Order: Magnoliales
- Family: Annonaceae
- Genus: Alphonsea
- Species: A. hainanensis

Binomial name
- Alphonsea hainanensis Merr. & Chun

Species of plant

Alphonsea hainanensis is a species of flowering plant in the Annonaceae family. It is a tree native to Vietnam and to Yunnan, southwestern Guangxi, and Hainan in southern China. It is an evergreen tree which grows up to 20 meters tall. It is native to subtropical and tropical lowland evergreen broadleaf forests, where it grows on hillsides from 400 to 700 meters elevation.

The species was first described by Elmer Drew Merrill and Woon Young Chun in 1940.
