= Knema oblongifolia =

Conservation status
- Conservation Dependent (IUCN 2.3)

Scientific classification
- Kingdom: Plantae
- Clade: Tracheophytes
- Clade: Angiosperms
- Clade: Magnoliids
- Order: Magnoliales
- Family: Myristicaceae
- Genus: Knema
- Species: K. oblongifolia

Binomial name
- Knema oblongifolia (King) Warb.

Synonyms
- Myristica oblongifolia King; Knema oblongifolia var. monticola (King) Warb.; Myristica oblongifolia var. monticola King

Species of tree

Knema oblongifolia is a species of flowering plant in the family Myristicaceae. It is a tree endemic to Peninsular Malaysia. It is threatened by habitat loss.
