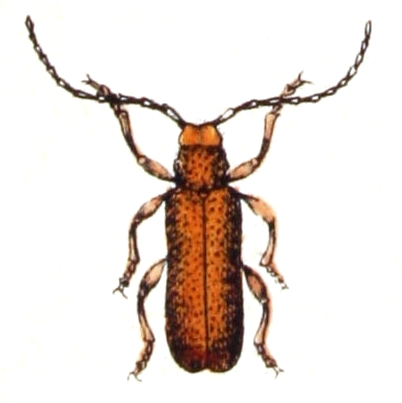
- Anaesthetis testacea

Scientific classification
- Domain: Eukaryota
- Kingdom: Animalia
- Phylum: Arthropoda
- Class: Insecta
- Order: Coleoptera
- Suborder: Polyphaga
- Infraorder: Cucujiformia
- Family: Cerambycidae
- Tribe: Desmiphorini
- Genus: Anaesthetis

= Anaesthetis =

Genus of beetles

Anaesthetis is a genus of longhorn beetles belonging to the subfamily Lamiinae.

It is common in Europe and includes the following species:

- Anaesthetis anatolica Holzschuh, 1969
- Anaesthetis confossicollis Baeckmann, 1903
- Anaesthetis flavipilis Baeckmann, 1903
- Anaesthetis lanuginosa Baeckmann, 1903
- Anaesthetis lepida Germar, 1848
- Anaesthetis testacea (Fabricius, 1781)
