= Knema pierrei =

Conservation status
- Vulnerable (IUCN 2.3)

Scientific classification
- Kingdom: Plantae
- Clade: Embryophytes
- Clade: Tracheophytes
- Clade: Spermatophytes
- Clade: Angiosperms
- Clade: Magnoliids
- Order: Magnoliales
- Family: Myristicaceae
- Genus: Knema
- Species: K. pierrei

Binomial name
- Knema pierrei Warb.

Synonyms
- Myristica dongnaiensis Pierre ex Lecomte, not validly publ.; Oxymitra dongnaiensis Pierre ex Finet & Gagnep., not validly publ.

Species of tree

Knema pierrei is a species of flowering plant in the family Myristicaceae. It is a tree native to Laos and Vietnam. The IUCN Red List assesses the species as Vulnerable.
