= Knema pubiflora =

Conservation status
- Endangered (IUCN 3.1)

Scientific classification
- Kingdom: Plantae
- Clade: Embryophytes
- Clade: Tracheophytes
- Clade: Spermatophytes
- Clade: Angiosperms
- Clade: Magnoliids
- Order: Magnoliales
- Family: Myristicaceae
- Genus: Knema
- Species: K. pubiflora

Binomial name
- Knema pubiflora W.J.de Wilde

Species of tree

Knema pubiflora is a species of flowering plant in the family Myristicaceae. It is endemic to Borneo. It is a mid-canopy tree up to 38 m tall and 41 cm dbh. Stem with red sap. Stipules absent. Leaves alternate, rather small, simple, penni-veined, glabrous to hairy below, whitish below. Flowers ca. 4 mm diameter, yellow-brown, placed in bundles. Fruits ca. 21 mm long, yellow-orange-brown, hairy, dehiscent capsules. Seeds with nearly undivided red aril.
