= Knema lenta =

Conservation status
- Least Concern (IUCN 3.1)

Scientific classification
- Kingdom: Plantae
- Clade: Embryophytes
- Clade: Tracheophytes
- Clade: Spermatophytes
- Clade: Angiosperms
- Clade: Magnoliids
- Order: Magnoliales
- Family: Myristicaceae
- Genus: Knema
- Species: K. lenta

Binomial name
- Knema lenta Warb.

Species of tree

Knema lenta is a species of flowering plant in the family Myristicaceae. It is called 狭叶红光树 xia ye hong guang shu in Chinese, and máu chó thấu kính in Vietnamese. It is a small tree native to Bangladesh, south-central China (Yunnan), eastern India (the Andaman Islands and Arunachal Pradesh), Myanmar, Thailand, Cambodia, and Vietnam.

The tree grows up to 20 m (66 ft) tall, in tropical moist forest areas up to 1,200 m (3,900 ft) elevation.

The species was described by Otto Warburg in 1897.
