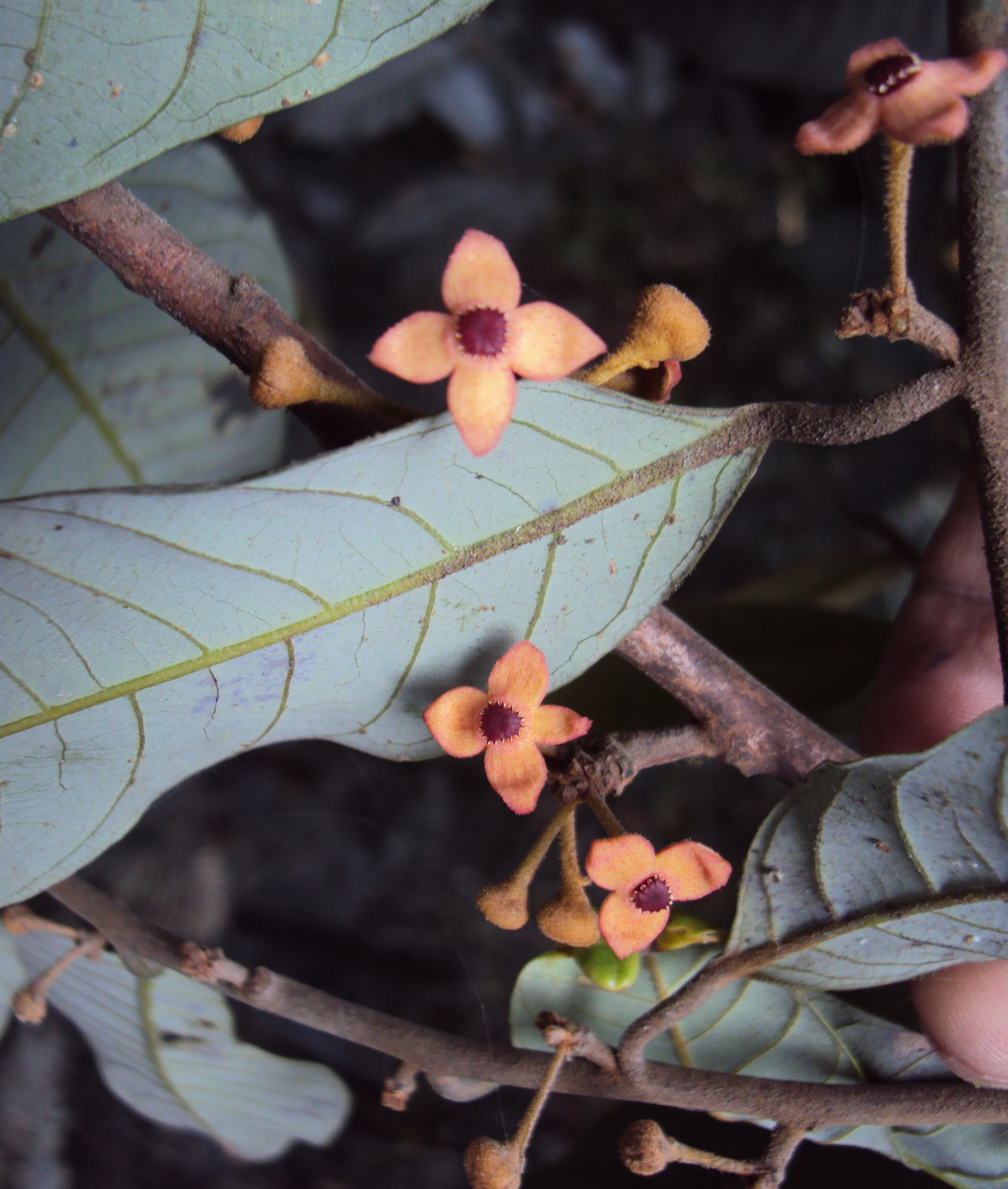
- Flowers

Conservation status
- Least Concern (IUCN 2.3)

Scientific classification
- Kingdom: Plantae
- Clade: Tracheophytes
- Clade: Angiosperms
- Clade: Magnoliids
- Order: Magnoliales
- Family: Myristicaceae
- Genus: Knema
- Species: K. attenuata

Binomial name
- Knema attenuata (Hook.f. & Th.) Warb.

Synonyms
- Myristica attenuata

= Knema attenuata =

Species of flowering plant

Knema attenuata is a species of plant in the family Myristicaceae. It is endemic to India.
