= Alphonsea tsangyanensis =

Conservation status
- Endangered (IUCN 3.1)

Scientific classification
- Kingdom: Plantae
- Clade: Tracheophytes
- Clade: Angiosperms
- Clade: Magnoliids
- Order: Magnoliales
- Family: Annonaceae
- Genus: Alphonsea
- Species: A. tsangyanensis

Binomial name
- Alphonsea tsangyanensis P.T.Li

Species of plant

Alphonsea tsangyanensis, sometimes spelled Alphonsea tsangyuanensis, is a species of flowering plant in the family Annonaceae. It is a tree endemic to southern Yunnan in south-central China. It is a small tree up to 12 meters tall. It is native to montane and submontane rain forest from 700 to 1,500 meters elevation, where it grows on forested slopes.

The species was first described by Ping Tao Li in 1976.
