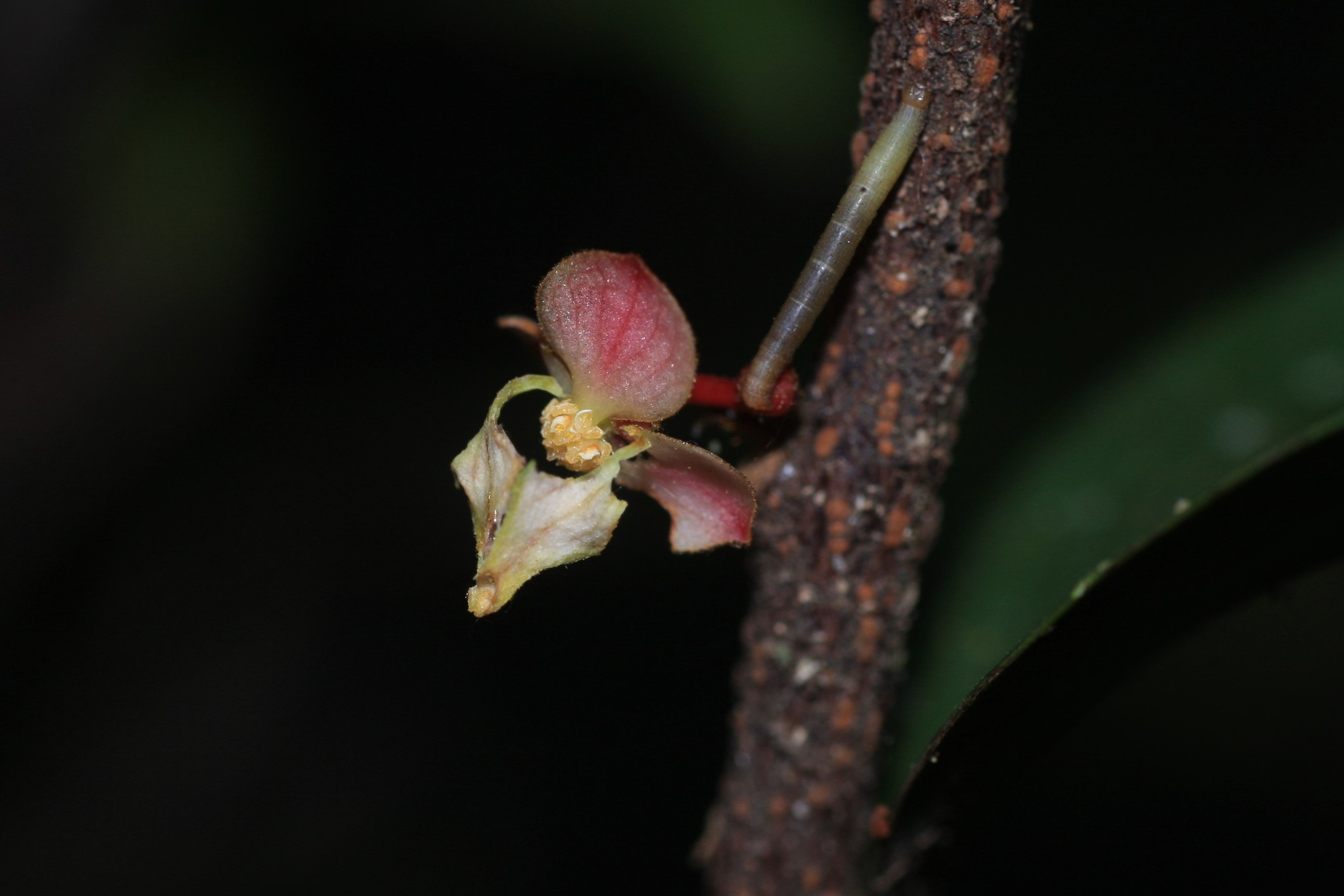

Conservation status
- Endangered (IUCN 3.1)

Scientific classification
- Kingdom: Plantae
- Clade: Embryophytes
- Clade: Tracheophytes
- Clade: Spermatophytes
- Clade: Angiosperms
- Clade: Magnoliids
- Order: Magnoliales
- Family: Annonaceae
- Genus: Orophea
- Species: O. thomsonii

Binomial name
- Orophea thomsonii Bedd.

= Orophea thomsonii =

Species of flowering plant

Orophea thomsonii or Thomson's Turret Flower is a species of shrub or small tree in the Annonaceae family. It is native to Kerala and Tamil Nadu in India and endemic to the Western Ghats mountain range.

== Description ==
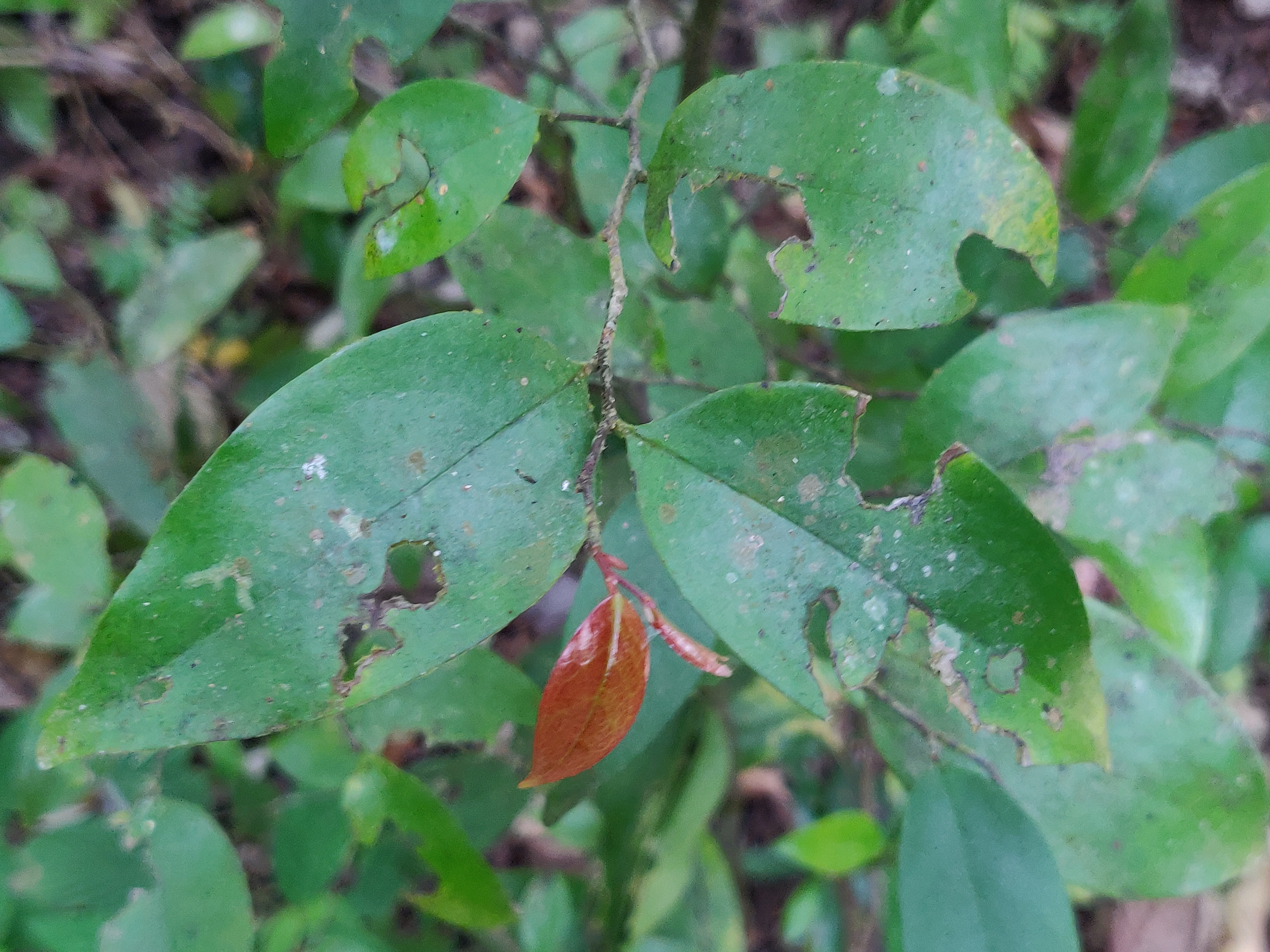
Mature and young leaves

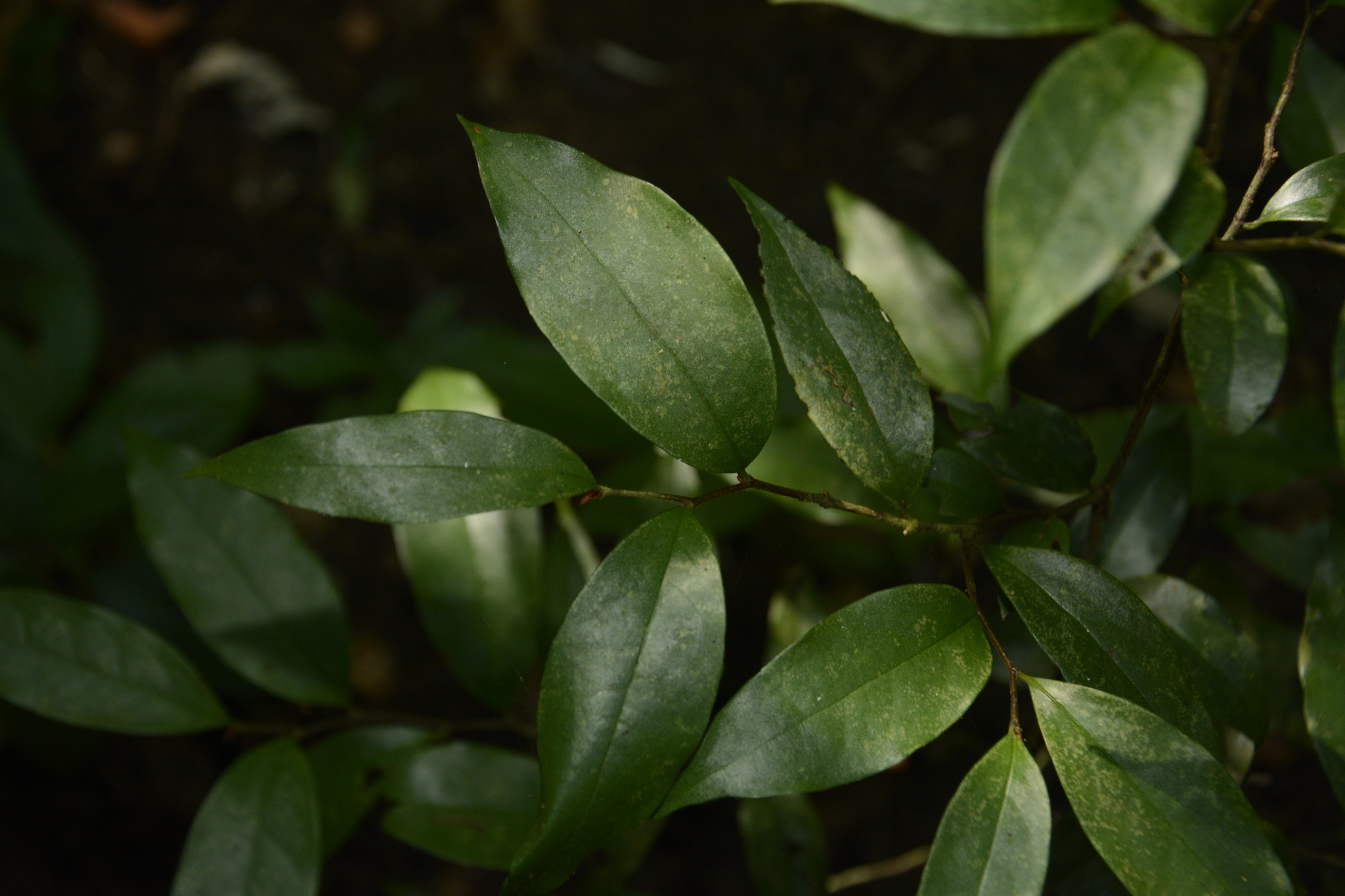
Branchlet showing dorsal surface of leaves

Woody evergreen plants, occurring as large shrubs or small trees up to 10 m tall. The tree has slender branches with the young branchlets being tomentose and holding waxy leaves to forming a canopy in the understorey of evergreen forests. Leaves are simple, alternate, and distichous, with short petioles (0.2-0.5 cm), cuneate or acute base, small lamina (5-7 x 2.5-3.5 cm), and about 6 pairs of secondary nerves. The tertiary nerves are reticulate. The leaves are hairless except for the midrib beneath. The leaf shape is ovate or ovate-elliptic with a long acuminate, rounded tip. The flowers are creamy white, found solitary or in cymes of 2–3 at the axils of leaves. The outer petals are strigose (with stiff hairs), inner pubescent inside. The peduncles are strigose and the pedicels are very short, slender, pubescent. The flower has oblong and horizontal nectaries, 10-12 stamens and 5-6 carpels. The fruit is a short-stalked, pea-sized, round berry about 8 mm in diameter, found in clusters, each with 1-2 round, brown seeds that appear wrinkled and pitted.

== Taxonomy ==
There are no synonyms of this species.

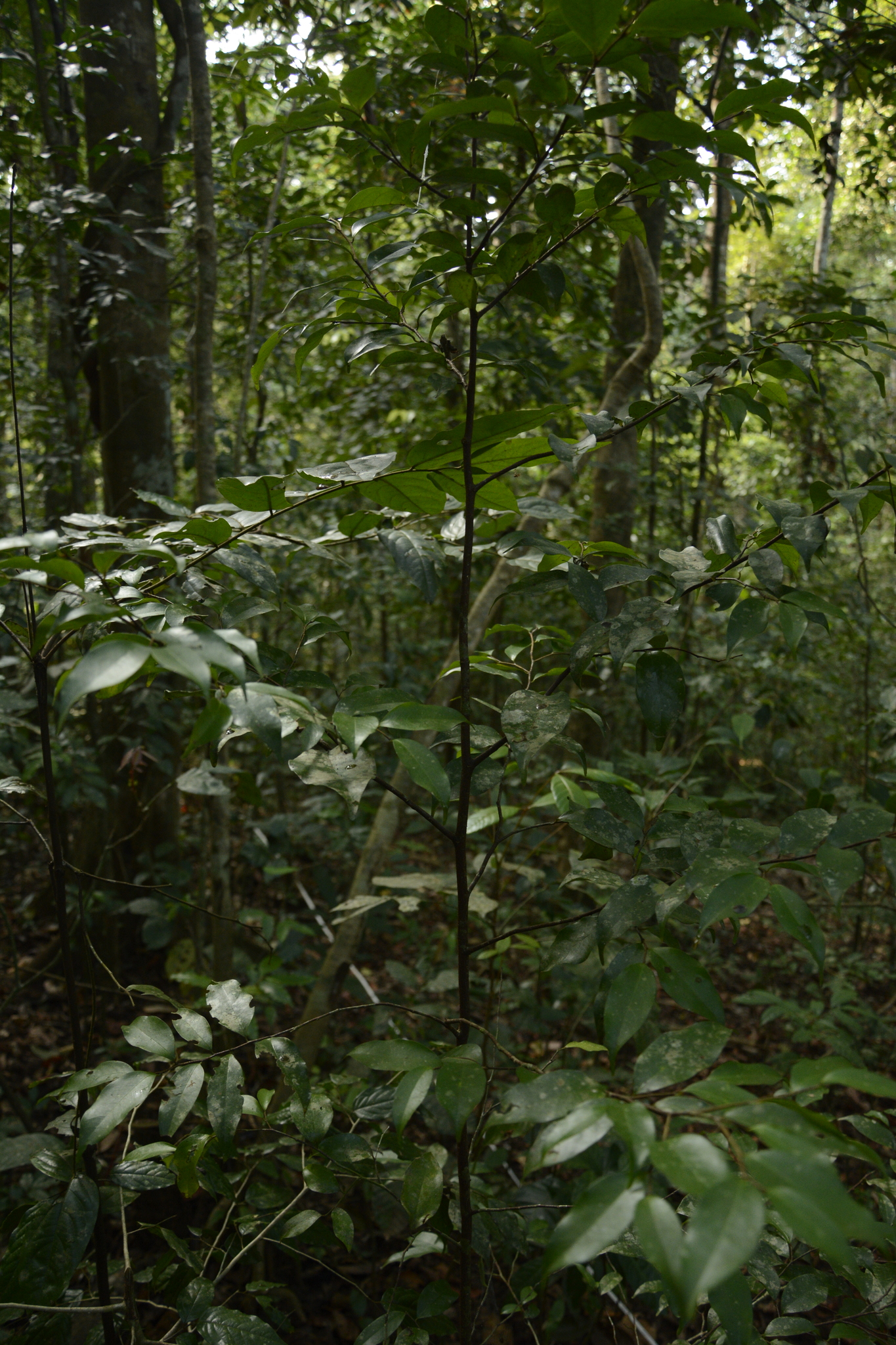
Sapling in understorey of tropical wet evergreen forests

== Distribution and habitat ==
The species is found along the Western Ghats in Kerala and Tamil Nadu, from Palakkad and Nilgiris District and further south in the Anamalai and Agasthyamalai Hills. It occurs in mid-elevation tropical wet evergreen forests between 250 and 1250 m above mean sea level.

== Uses ==
The plant is known to have medicinal uses among the indigenous people in Kalakad-Mundanthurai Tiger Reserve.
