= Alphonsea philastreana =

Conservation status
- Data Deficient (IUCN 3.1)

Scientific classification
- Kingdom: Plantae
- Clade: Embryophytes
- Clade: Tracheophytes
- Clade: Spermatophytes
- Clade: Angiosperms
- Clade: Magnoliids
- Order: Magnoliales
- Family: Annonaceae
- Subfamily: Malmeoideae
- Tribe: Miliuseae
- Genus: Alphonsea
- Species: A. philastreana

Binomial name
- Alphonsea philastreana (Pierre) Finet & Gagnep.

Synonyms
- Bocagea philastreana Pierre

Species of flowering plant

Alphonsea philastreana is a tree species first described by Pierre, named by Finet and Gagnepain and included in the family Annonaceae. It is known only from Vietnam. No subspecies are listed in the Catalogue of Life. Its Vietnamese name is an phong nhiều trái.
