= Anaesthetis lanuginosa =

Scientific classification
- Domain: Eukaryota
- Kingdom: Animalia
- Phylum: Arthropoda
- Class: Insecta
- Order: Coleoptera
- Suborder: Polyphaga
- Infraorder: Cucujiformia
- Family: Cerambycidae
- Genus: Anaesthetis
- Species: A. lanuginosa

Binomial name
- Anaesthetis lanuginosa Baeckmann, 1903

Species of beetle

Anaesthetis lanuginosa is a species of beetle in the family Cerambycidae. It was described by Baeckmann in 1903. It is known from Central Asia and Iran.
