= Anaesthetis anatolica =

Scientific classification
- Domain: Eukaryota
- Kingdom: Animalia
- Phylum: Arthropoda
- Class: Insecta
- Order: Coleoptera
- Suborder: Polyphaga
- Infraorder: Cucujiformia
- Family: Cerambycidae
- Genus: Anaesthetis
- Species: A. anatolica

Binomial name
- Anaesthetis anatolica Holzschuh, 1969

Species of beetle

Anaesthetis anatolica is a species of beetle in the family Cerambycidae. It was described by Holzschuh in 1969. It is known from Turkey.
