= Orophea creaghii =

Conservation status
- Least Concern (IUCN 3.1)

Scientific classification
- Kingdom: Plantae
- Clade: Embryophytes
- Clade: Tracheophytes
- Clade: Spermatophytes
- Clade: Angiosperms
- Clade: Magnoliids
- Order: Magnoliales
- Family: Annonaceae
- Genus: Orophea
- Species: O. creaghii

Binomial name
- Orophea creaghii (Ridl.) Leonardía & Kessler

Synonyms
- Mezzettiopsis creaghii Ridl.; Orophea palawanensis Elmer

Species of flowering plant

Orophea creaghii, synonym Orophea palawanensis, is a species of plant in the family Annonaceae. It is native to Borneo and the Philippines, where it is confined to Palawan.
