= Knema andamanica =

Scientific classification
- Kingdom: Plantae
- Clade: Embryophytes
- Clade: Tracheophytes
- Clade: Angiosperms
- Clade: Magnoliids
- Order: Magnoliales
- Family: Myristicaceae
- Genus: Knema
- Species: K. andamanica

Binomial name
- Knema andamanica (Warb.) W.J.de Wilde

Synonyms
- Knema cinerea var. andamanica (Warb.) J.Sinclair; Knema glauca var. andamanica Warb.

Species of flowering plant

Knema andamanica is a tree species in the Myristicaceae family. It is native to Thailand, Sumatra, Malaysia, and the Andaman and Nicobar Islands of India.

There are 3 subspecies assigned to this species:

- Knema andamanica subsp. andamanica
- Knema andamanica subsp. nicobarica (Warb.) W.J.de Wilde
- Knema andamanica subsp. peninsularis W.J.de Wilde
