= Knema tonkinensis =

Conservation status
- Vulnerable (IUCN 2.3)

Scientific classification
- Kingdom: Plantae
- Clade: Embryophytes
- Clade: Tracheophytes
- Clade: Spermatophytes
- Clade: Angiosperms
- Clade: Magnoliids
- Order: Magnoliales
- Family: Myristicaceae
- Genus: Knema
- Species: K. tonkinensis

Binomial name
- Knema tonkinensis (Warb.) W.J.de Wilde

Synonyms
- Knema conferta var. tonkinensis Warb.; Myristica conferta var. tonkinensis Warb.

Species of flowering plant

Knema tonkinensis is a species of flowering plant in the family Myristicaceae. It is a tree native to Laos, Vietnam, and Yunnan in southern China.
