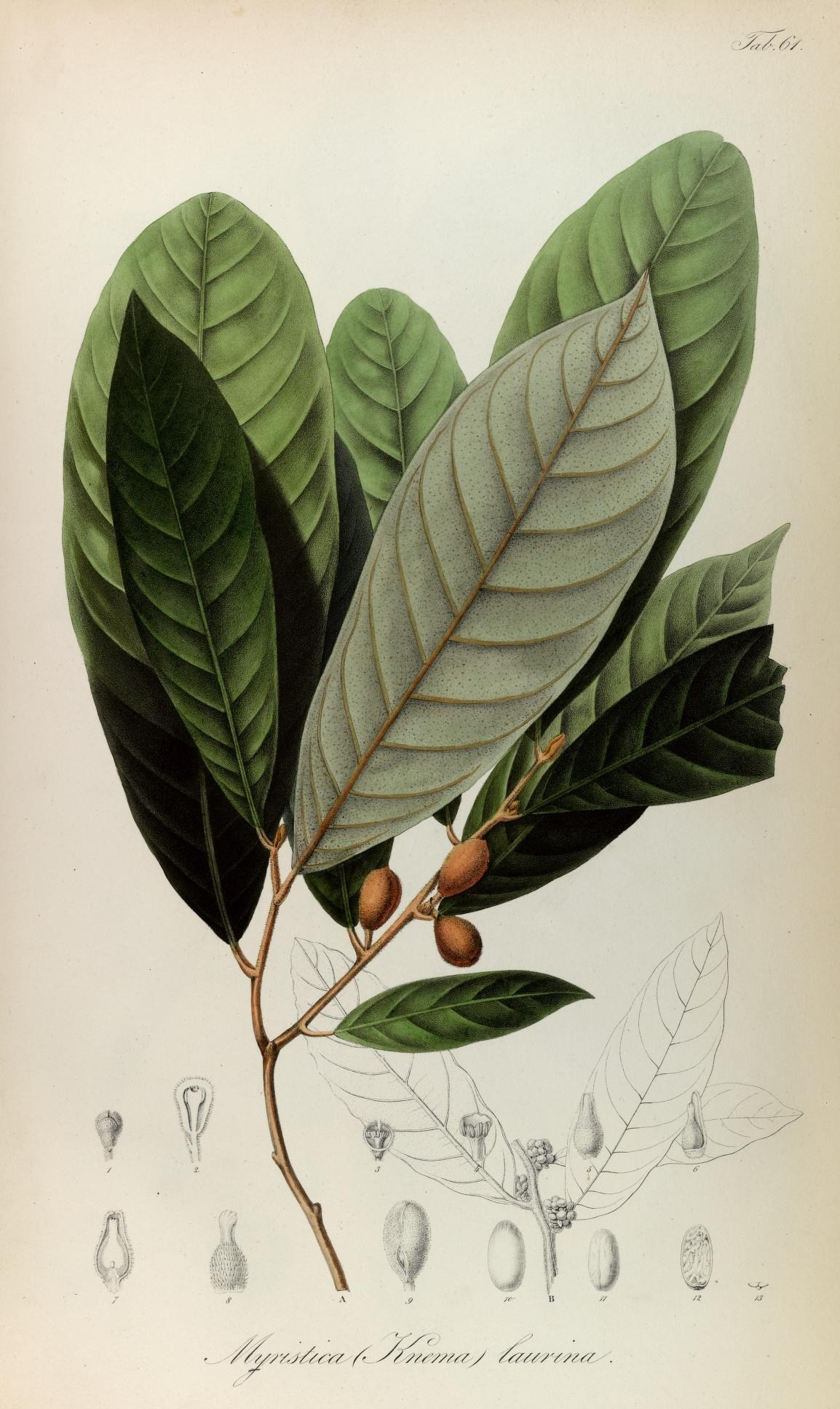
- Illustration of Knema laurina

Conservation status
- Least Concern (IUCN 3.1)

Scientific classification
- Kingdom: Plantae
- Clade: Embryophytes
- Clade: Tracheophytes
- Clade: Spermatophytes
- Clade: Angiosperms
- Clade: Magnoliids
- Order: Magnoliales
- Family: Myristicaceae
- Genus: Knema
- Species: K. laurina

Binomial name
- Knema laurina (Blume) Warb.

Varieties
- Knema laurina var. heteropilis W.J.de Wilde; Knema laurina var. laurina

Synonyms
- Myristica laurina Blume (1837); Palala laurina (Blume) Kuntze; synonyms of var. heteropilis: Myristica furfurascens Gand.; synonyms of var. laurina: Knema cantleyi (Hook.f.) Warb.; Myristica cantleyi Hook.f.; Myristica laurina var. borneensis Miq.; Myristica laurina var. longifolia Miq.; Myristica tomentosa Blume, nom. illeg. homonym. post.; Palala cantleyi (Hook.f.) Kuntze

= Knema laurina =

Species of tree

Knema laurina is a species of tree in the family Myristicaceae. It is native to western Indochina (Myanmar, the Nicobar Islands, and Peninsular Thailand) and western Malesia – Peninsular Malaysia, Java, Borneo, and Sumatra (including Simeulue, Siberut, and Bangka).

Two varieties are accepted:

- Knema laurina var. heteropilis W.J.de Wilde – Peninsular Malaysia, Sumatra, and western Java
- Knema laurina var. laurina – western Indochina and western Malesia

The species was first described as Myristica laurina by Carl Ludwig Blume in 1837. In 1897 Otto Warburg placed the species in genus Knema as Knema laurina.
