= Knema losirensis =

Conservation status
- Conservation Dependent (IUCN 2.3)

Scientific classification
- Kingdom: Plantae
- Clade: Tracheophytes
- Clade: Angiosperms
- Clade: Magnoliids
- Order: Magnoliales
- Family: Myristicaceae
- Genus: Knema
- Species: K. losirensis

Binomial name
- Knema losirensis de Wilde

Species of tree

Knema losirensis is a species of plant in the family Myristicaceae. It is a tree endemic to Sumatra.
