= Knema minima =

Conservation status
- Least Concern (IUCN 3.1)

Scientific classification
- Kingdom: Plantae
- Clade: Tracheophytes
- Clade: Angiosperms
- Clade: Magnoliids
- Order: Magnoliales
- Family: Myristicaceae
- Genus: Knema
- Species: K. minima

Binomial name
- Knema minima W.J.de Wilde

Species of flowering plant

Knema minima is a species of flowering plant in the Myristicaceae (nutmeg) family. It is native to Brunei and possibly Sarawak.
