= Knema longepilosa =

Conservation status
- Endangered (IUCN 3.1)

Scientific classification
- Kingdom: Plantae
- Clade: Embryophytes
- Clade: Tracheophytes
- Clade: Spermatophytes
- Clade: Angiosperms
- Clade: Magnoliids
- Order: Magnoliales
- Family: Myristicaceae
- Genus: Knema
- Species: K. longepilosa

Binomial name
- Knema longepilosa (W.J.de Wilde) W.J.de Wilde

Synonyms
- Knema percoriacea f. longepilosa W.J.de Wilde

Species of tree

Knema longepilosa is a species of plant in the family Myristicaceae. It is a tree native to central Sarawak and west-central Kalimantan in Borneo.
