= Knema glaucescens =

Conservation status
- Least Concern (IUCN 3.1)

Scientific classification
- Kingdom: Plantae
- Clade: Embryophytes
- Clade: Tracheophytes
- Clade: Spermatophytes
- Clade: Angiosperms
- Clade: Magnoliids
- Order: Magnoliales
- Family: Myristicaceae
- Genus: Knema
- Species: K. glaucescens

Binomial name
- Knema glaucescens Jack

Synonyms
- Myristica glaucescens (Jack) Hook.f. & Thomson; Palala glaucescens (Jack) Kuntze; Knema geminata (Miq.) Warb.; Myristica geminata Miq.; Palala geminata (Miq.) Kuntze

Species of flowering plant

Knema glaucescens is a species of plant in the family Myristicaceae. It is a tree native to Sumatra, Peninsular Malaysia, Singapore and Borneo. However, a morpho-taxonomic study of fossil leaves assemblage discovered from the upper part of the Siwalik succession of sediments of Papum Pare district, Arunachal Pradesh, India, had shape, base and venation pattern comparable to Knema glaucescens (Myristicaceae).
