= Knema kostermansiana =

Conservation status
- Vulnerable (IUCN 3.1)

Scientific classification
- Kingdom: Plantae
- Clade: Embryophytes
- Clade: Tracheophytes
- Clade: Spermatophytes
- Clade: Angiosperms
- Clade: Magnoliids
- Order: Magnoliales
- Family: Myristicaceae
- Genus: Knema
- Species: K. kostermansiana

Binomial name
- Knema kostermansiana W.J.de Wilde

Species of tree

Knema kostermansiana is a species of plant in the family Myristicaceae. It is a tree endemic to Sabah on Borneo. These trees typically vary from about six to 20 meters in height. The leaves are membranous (thin and transparent), chartaceous (paper-like), and elliptic. Possessing short fruit that are typically solitary or grouped with only one or two others, the tree possesses raised nerves.
