= Knema mogeana =

Conservation status
- Least Concern (IUCN 3.1)

Scientific classification
- Kingdom: Plantae
- Clade: Embryophytes
- Clade: Tracheophytes
- Clade: Spermatophytes
- Clade: Angiosperms
- Clade: Magnoliids
- Order: Magnoliales
- Family: Myristicaceae
- Genus: Knema
- Species: K. mogeana

Binomial name
- Knema mogeana W.J.de Wilde

Species of tree

Knema mogeana is a species of flowering plant in the family Myristicaceae. It is a tree endemic to Borneo.
