= Knema communis =

Conservation status
- Vulnerable (IUCN 2.3)

Scientific classification
- Kingdom: Plantae
- Clade: Embryophytes
- Clade: Tracheophytes
- Clade: Spermatophytes
- Clade: Angiosperms
- Clade: Magnoliids
- Order: Magnoliales
- Family: Myristicaceae
- Genus: Knema
- Species: K. communis

Binomial name
- Knema communis J.Sinclair

Species of tree

Knema communis is a species of plant in the family Myristicaceae. It is a tree found in Peninsular Malaysia and Singapore. It is threatened by habitat loss.
