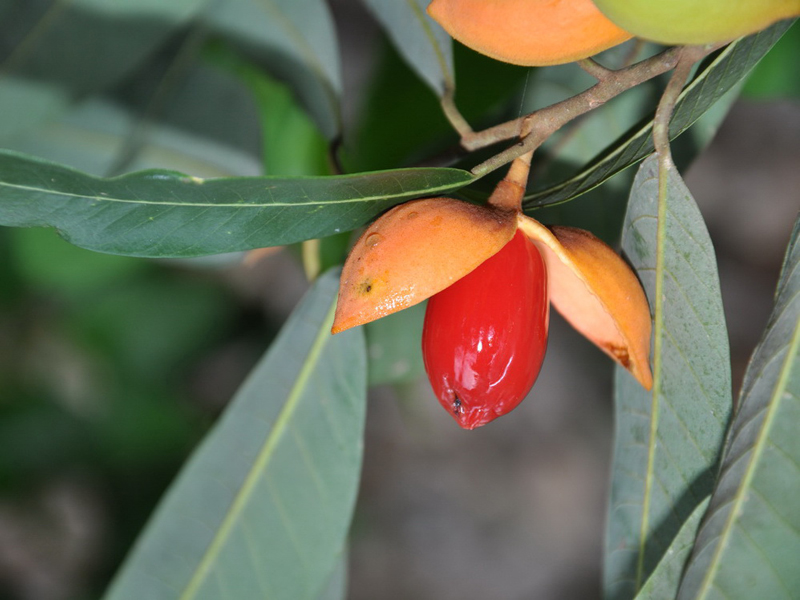

Conservation status
- Least Concern (IUCN 3.1)

Scientific classification
- Kingdom: Plantae
- Clade: Tracheophytes
- Clade: Angiosperms
- Clade: Magnoliids
- Order: Magnoliales
- Family: Myristicaceae
- Genus: Knema
- Species: K. corticosa

Binomial name
- Knema corticosa Lour.

Synonyms
- List: Knema bicolor Raf.; Knema globularia (Lam.) Warb.; Knema missionis (Wall. ex King) Warb.; Knema petelotii Merr.; Knema sphaerula (Hook.f.) Airy Shaw; Knema wangii Hu; Myristica corticosa (Lour.) Hook.f. & Thomson; Myristica globularia Lam.; Myristica lanceolata Wall.; Myristica microcarpa Willd.; Myristica missionis Wall. ex King; Myristica sphaerula Hook. fil.; Palala corticosa (Lour.) Kuntze; Palala globularia (Lam.) Kuntze; Palala sphaerula (Hook.f.) Kuntze

= Knema corticosa =

Species of plant

Knema corticosa (synonym Knema globularia), commonly known as seashore nutmeg, is a species of flowering plant in the family Myristicaceae. It is a tree found in northeastern India, Indochina, south-central China (Yunnan), Peninsular Malaysia, Sumatra, and Java. It grows on rocky and sandy coasts, riverbanks, and lowland forests.

== Botany ==
The tree grows to average of 4-5 metres, but it can grow tall up to 24 m. It has brown to dark green bark with a scaly or cracking surface. The leaves are oblong measuring 4–24 centimetres long and 1.5—7 sm wide, each of them has a shiny surface and a dull bottom.

The tree flowers from April to July in most places, but November to February in Thailand. It bears clusters of 1 to 5 fruit, each fruit is spherical with a diameter between 1.0–2 cm and covered with rust brown hairs. When the fruit is ripe, it splits to reveal a seed covered in a bright red or yellowish-orange aril.
