= Alphonsea lucida =

Conservation status
- Vulnerable (IUCN 3.1)

Scientific classification
- Kingdom: Plantae
- Clade: Tracheophytes
- Clade: Angiosperms
- Clade: Magnoliids
- Order: Magnoliales
- Family: Annonaceae
- Genus: Alphonsea
- Species: A. lucida

Binomial name
- Alphonsea lucida King

Species of flowering plant

Alphonsea lucida is a species of flowering plant in the family Annonaceae. It is endemic to Peninsular Malaysia.
