= Alphonsea monogyna =

Conservation status
- Vulnerable (IUCN 3.1)

Scientific classification
- Kingdom: Plantae
- Clade: Tracheophytes
- Clade: Angiosperms
- Clade: Magnoliids
- Order: Magnoliales
- Family: Annonaceae
- Genus: Alphonsea
- Species: A. monogyna

Binomial name
- Alphonsea monogyna Merr. & Chun

Species of flowering plant

Alphonsea monogyna is a species of flowering plant in the Annonaceae family. It is a tree native to Guangxi, Hainan, and southern Yunnan in southern China and to northern Vietnam.
