= Knema bengalensis =

Conservation status
- Vulnerable (IUCN 2.3)

Scientific classification
- Kingdom: Plantae
- Clade: Embryophytes
- Clade: Tracheophytes
- Clade: Spermatophytes
- Clade: Angiosperms
- Clade: Magnoliids
- Order: Magnoliales
- Family: Myristicaceae
- Genus: Knema
- Species: K. bengalensis

Binomial name
- Knema bengalensis W.J.de Wilde

Species of tree

Knema bengalensis is a species of flowering plant in the family Myristicaceae. It is a tree endemic to Bangladesh. Its type was collected in the Chittagong District of Bangladesh, and in 1997 it was classed as vulnerable on the IUCN red list.
