= Orophea cumingiana =

Conservation status
- Near Threatened (IUCN 3.1)

Scientific classification
- Kingdom: Plantae
- Clade: Embryophytes
- Clade: Tracheophytes
- Clade: Spermatophytes
- Clade: Angiosperms
- Clade: Magnoliids
- Order: Magnoliales
- Family: Annonaceae
- Genus: Orophea
- Species: O. cumingiana

Binomial name
- Orophea cumingiana S.Vidal

Synonyms
- Mitrephora aversa Elmer; Orophea aversa (Elmer) Merr.; Orophea bracteolata Merr.; Orophea polyantha Merr.; Orophea submaculata Elmer; Orophea tarrosae Merr.; Orophea williamsii Merr.

Species of flowering plant

Orophea cumingiana, synonym Orophea submaculata, is a species of plant in the family Annonaceae. It is endemic to the Philippines. It is threatened by habitat loss.
