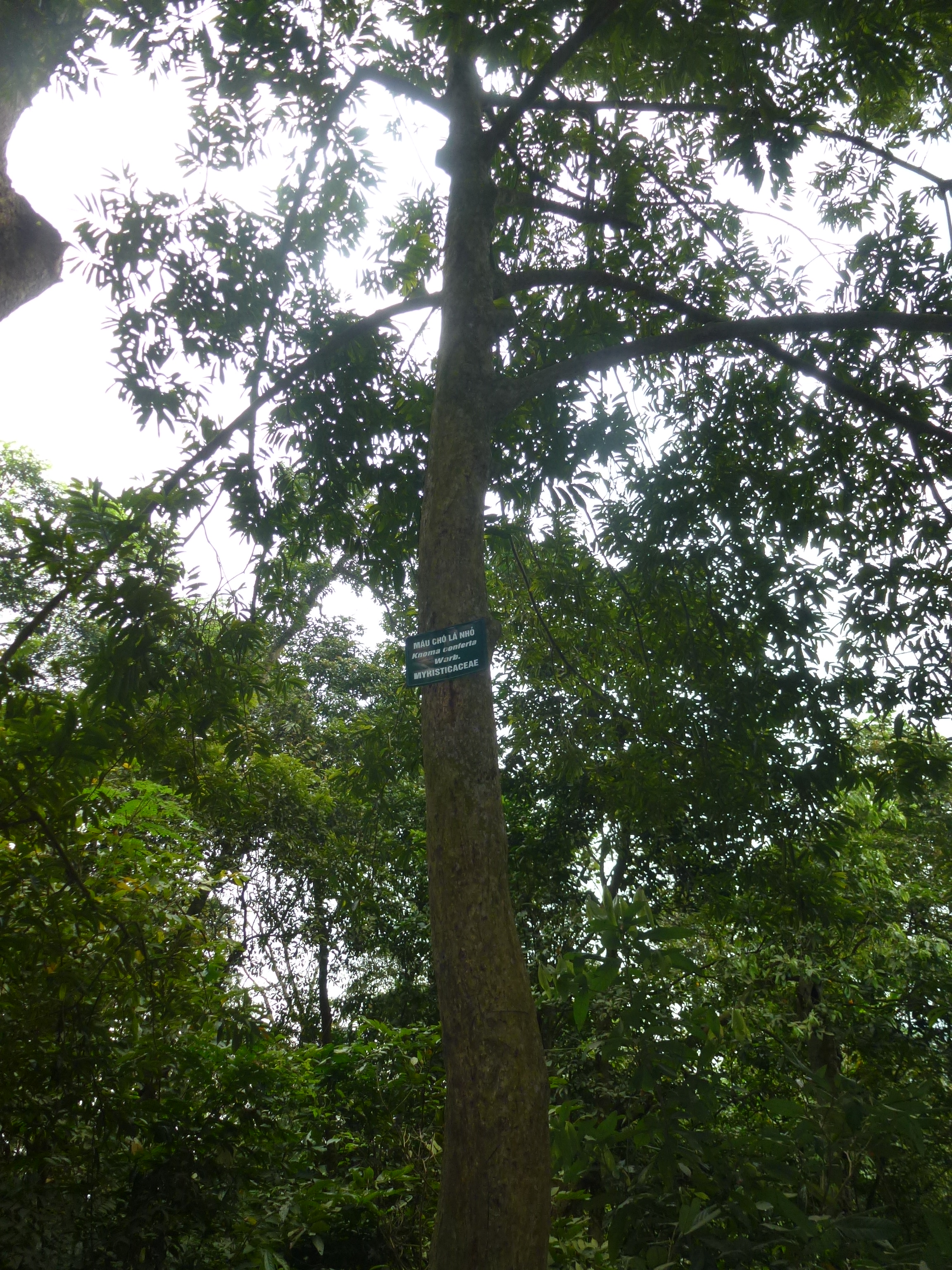

Conservation status
- Least Concern (IUCN 3.1)

Scientific classification
- Kingdom: Plantae
- Clade: Embryophytes
- Clade: Tracheophytes
- Clade: Spermatophytes
- Clade: Angiosperms
- Clade: Magnoliids
- Order: Magnoliales
- Family: Myristicaceae
- Genus: Knema
- Species: K. conferta

Binomial name
- Knema conferta (King) Warb.

Synonyms
- Myristica conferta King

= Knema conferta =

Species of flowering plant

Knema conferta is a species of flowering plant in the family Myristicaceae. It is native to the Andaman Islands, Borneo, Peninsular Malaysia, Singapore, and Sumatra.

The species was first described as Myristica conferta by George King in 1891. In 1897 Otto Warburg placed the species in genus Knema as K. conferta.
