= Knema intermedia =

Conservation status
- Least Concern (IUCN 3.1)

Scientific classification
- Kingdom: Plantae
- Clade: Embryophytes
- Clade: Tracheophytes
- Clade: Spermatophytes
- Clade: Angiosperms
- Clade: Magnoliids
- Order: Magnoliales
- Family: Myristicaceae
- Genus: Knema
- Species: K. intermedia

Binomial name
- Knema intermedia (Blume) Warb.

Synonyms
- Myristica corticosa var. decipiens Miq.; Myristica intermedia Blume; Myristica iteophylla Miq.; Palala intermedia (Blume) Kuntze; Palala iteophylla (Miq.) Kuntze

Species of tree

Knema intermedia is a species of flowering plant in the family Myristicaceae. It is a tree native to Sumatra, Peninsular Malaysia, Singapore, Java, and Borneo.

The species was first described as Myristica intermedia by Carl Ludwig Blume in 1837. In 1895 Otto Warburg placed the species in genus Knema as K. intermedia.
