= Alphonsea yunnanensis =

Conservation status
- Critically Endangered (IUCN 3.1)

Scientific classification
- Kingdom: Plantae
- Clade: Embryophytes
- Clade: Tracheophytes
- Clade: Spermatophytes
- Clade: Angiosperms
- Clade: Magnoliids
- Order: Magnoliales
- Family: Annonaceae
- Genus: Alphonsea
- Species: A. yunnanensis

Binomial name
- Alphonsea yunnanensis (P.T.Li) Y.H.Tan & B.Yang bis

Synonyms
- Orophea yunnanensis P.T.Li

Species of flowering plant

Alphonsea yunnanensis is a species of flowering plant in the Annonaceae family. It is a shrub or tree endemic to Yunnan in south-central China.

The species was first described as Orophea yunnanensis by Ping Tao Li in 1976. In 2025 the species was placed in genus Alphonsea as A. yunnanensis.
