= Twig =

Small thin terminal branch of a woody plant

Twigs covered in powdered snow

A twig is a thin, often short, branch of a tree or bush.

The buds on the twig are an important diagnostic characteristic, as are the abscission scars where the leaves have fallen away. The color, texture, and patterning of the twig bark are also important, in addition to the thickness and nature of any pith of the twig.

There are two types of twigs: vegetative twigs and fruiting spurs. Fruiting spurs are specialized twigs that generally branch off the sides of branches and are stubby and slow-growing, with many annular ring markings from seasons past. The twig's age and rate of growth can be determined by counting the winter terminal bud scale scars, or annular ring marking, across the diameter of the twig.

== Uses ==
Twigs can be useful in starting a fire. They can be used as kindling wood, bridging the gap between highly flammable tinder (dry grass and leaves) and firewood. This is due to their high amounts of stored carbon dioxide used in photosynthesis.

Twigs are a feature of tool use by non-humans. For example, chimpanzees have been observed using twigs to go "fishing" for termites, and elephants have been reported using twigs to scratch parts of their ears and mouths which could not be reached by rubbing against a tree.
