= Thomas Thomson (botanist) =

Scottish doctor and botanist

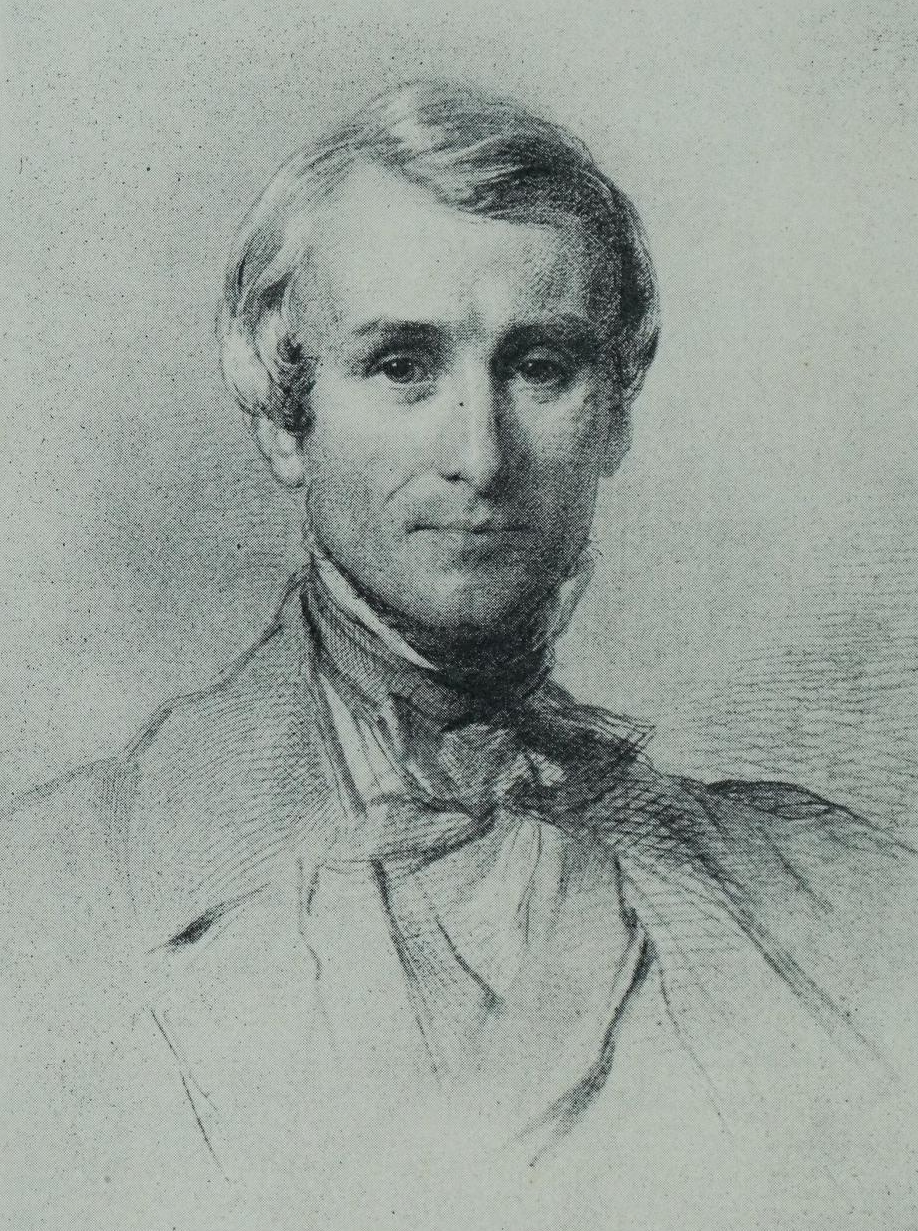

Thomas Thomson (4 December 1817 – 18 April 1878) was a British surgeon with the British East India Company before becoming a botanist. He was a friend of Joseph Dalton Hooker, travelled with him in Sikkim and helped write the first volume of Flora Indica. With Hooker he distributed the exsiccata-like series Herbarium Indiae orientalis.

== Life and work ==
Thomson was born in Glasgow, the son of Thomas Thomson, a chemistry professor at Glasgow University. He qualified as an M.D. at Glasgow University in 1839, and was appointed Assistant Surgeon in the Bengal Army on 21 December 1839. The classes of William Hooker made him keenly interested in botany. Reaching Calcutta in 1840 he served as a curator of the Museum of the Asiatic Society.

Shortly after reaching India he served during the campaign in Afghanistan 1839-1842. He was present at the capture of Ghazni in 1839, and was taken prisoner at Ghazni in March 1842, and taken to be sold as slaves in Bokhara, but escaped by bribing the Afghan captors on 21 September 1842. He served in the Sutlej campaign, 1845–46, being present at Firuzshahr, and in the second Sikh war, 1848–49.

During 1847–48, Thomson served on the Kashmir Boundary Commission under the leadership of Alexander Cunningham. (Henry Strachey was the other commissioner.) Thomson explored the northern frontier of Kashmir, along the Karakoram Range.

He was promoted to Surgeon on 1 December 1853 and Surgeon Major on 21 December 1859.

In 1854, he became Superintendent of the Honourable East India Company's Botanic Garden at Calcutta and was the Naturalist to and Member of the Tibet Mission. He was appointed a Fellow of the Royal Society in 1855 and returned invalid to England in 1861 and retired on 25 September 1863. He briefly visited India as an interpreter for the eclipse expedition of 1871. In 1866, he was awarded the Royal Geographical Society's Founder's Medal. He was a fellow of the Linnean Society from 1852.

He lived in Kew for a while and later Maidstone, and died in London, England, on 18 April 1878.
