= James Sinclair (botanist) =

Scottish botanist

- Born: 29 November 1913; Orkney, Scotland
- Died: 26 February 1968 (aged 54); Orkney, Scotland
- Education: Edinburgh University
- Scientific career
- Fields: Botany
- Workplaces: Royal Botanic Garden Edinburgh; Singapore Botanic Gardens
- Author abbrev. (botany): J.Sinclair

James Sinclair (1913–1968) was a Scottish botanist, who worked at the Royal Botanic Garden Edinburgh and the Singapore Botanic Gardens.

== Life ==
Sinclair was born in the Bu of Hoy Orkney, Scotland on 29 November 1913. He received a degree in botany from the Edinburgh University. He served as a radar operator in the Royal Air Force from 1941 to 1945. In 1968 he succumbed to cancer and was buried in Hoy.

== Work ==
He was a botanist at the Edinburgh Royal Botanical Garden where he oversaw the herbarium. In 1948 he became the herbarium curator at the Singapore Botanic Gardens. Much of his work focused on the flowering plant families Annonaceae and Myristicaceae, though he also had an interest in marine plants and mosses.

== Legacy ==
He is the authority for at least 192 taxa including: IPNI. List of plant names with authority J.Sinclair.
His life and works have been honored as part of the Hoy Heritage project.
