= Bang Boet =

Beach in Thailand

Bang Boet บางเบิด (Thai)
- Coast
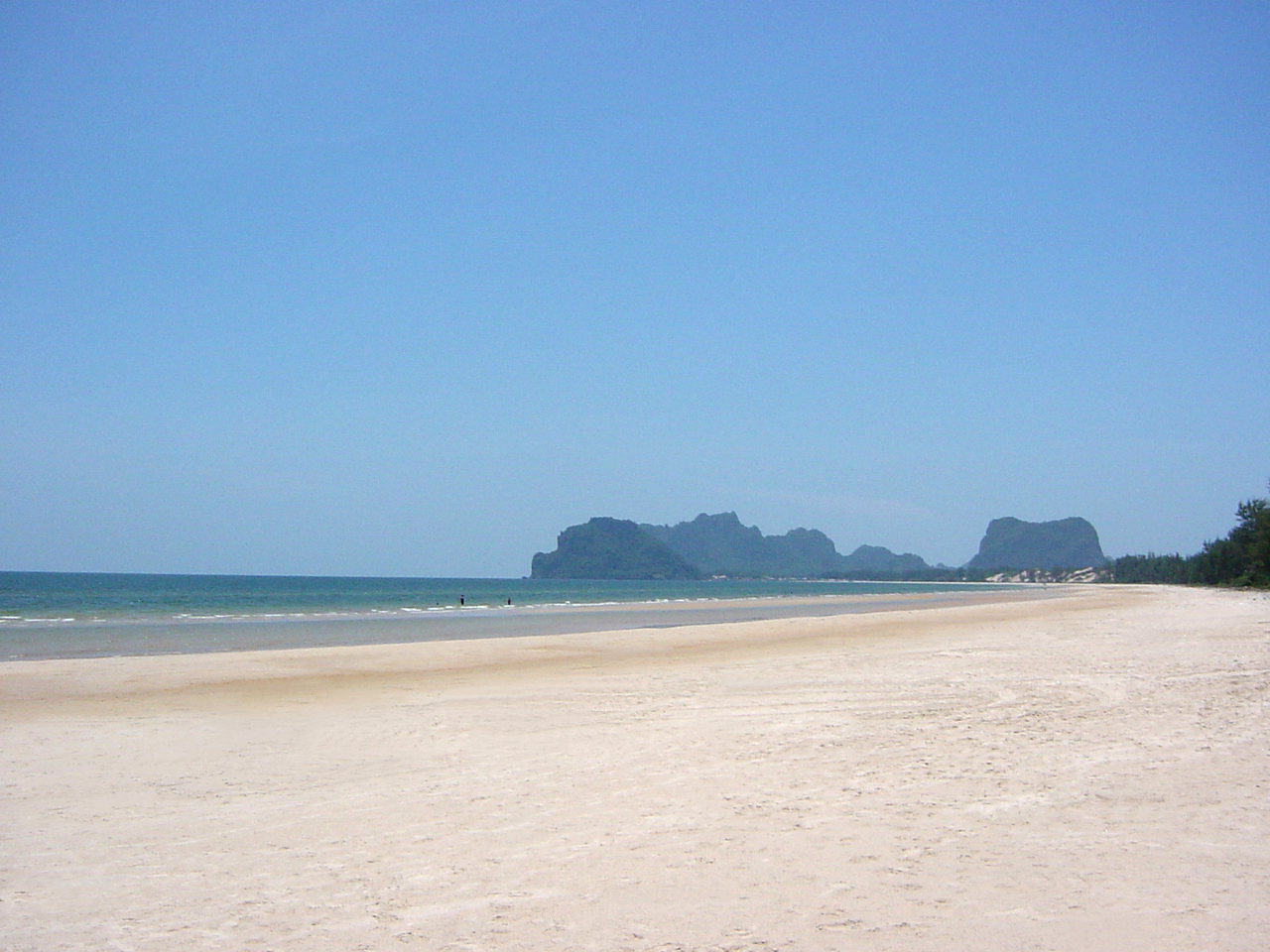
- Bang Boet Beach in Pathio side

- Bang Boet in Thailand
- Coordinates: 10.988°N 99.496°E
- Location: Bang Saphan Noi, Prachuap Khiri Khan and Pathio, Chumphon, Thailand
- Offshore water bodies: Gulf of Thailand
- Etymology: Place of bombs

Dimensions
  - Length: 14 kilometres (8.7 mi)

Bang Boet (also written as Bang Berd; Thai: บางเบิด, pronounced [bāːŋ bɤ̀ːt]) is a coastal area of the Gulf of Thailand belonging to Sai Thong Sub-district, Bang Saphan Noi District of Prachuap Khiri Khan Province and Pak Khlong Sub-district, Pathio District of Chumphon province.

Its name Bang Boet, literally translated as "place of bombs", because in World War II it was a target that was bombed by the Allies. In the past, Bang Boet was known for farming watermelons on Prince Sithiporn Kridakara's cultivation. He originally brought the seed from the USA. These watermelons were large in size, sweet and crispy, known as Bang Boet Watermelon.

Bang Boet is a small curving bay with a clean beach and water. It also has a hill of the same name, Khao Bang Boet, which is a notable feature. Half of the hill is on land, and the other half went down into the sea. Half way north of Prachuap Khiri Khan, and the other half to the south, is of Chumphon. The southern part of the hill has a canal. The canal is divided between the provinces of Prachuap Khiri Khan and Chumphon.

Bang Boet Beach has a length of approximately 14 km (8.7 mi) and is cool. Not far from the beach and hill is home to the Sithiporn Kridakara Research Station and Museum that exhibits his work and biography.

Beside the road along the station to the south at Tham Thong Beach is the only remaining sand dune in Thailand. The sand dune lies almost parallel to the present coastline with highest elevation of about 20 m (65.6 ft) above mean sea level and covers an area of 2,000 rais (790 acres), a total distance of 10 km (6.2 mi). The growing plants are unusual, similar to desert plants. It is maintained by the Chumphon Royal Development Project, a royal project of H.M.King Bhumibol Adulyadej (Rama IX).

In addition, there is also a jetty called Bang Boet Fish Marketing that extends into the sea. Snorkelling is a common activity.

Bang Boet can be reached by two train stations Bang Saphan Noi and Huai Sak of the State Railway of Thailand (SRT), whose Southern Line runs through the area.
