= Songkran (Thailand) =

Traditional Thai New Year's holiday

Songkran; สงกรานต์
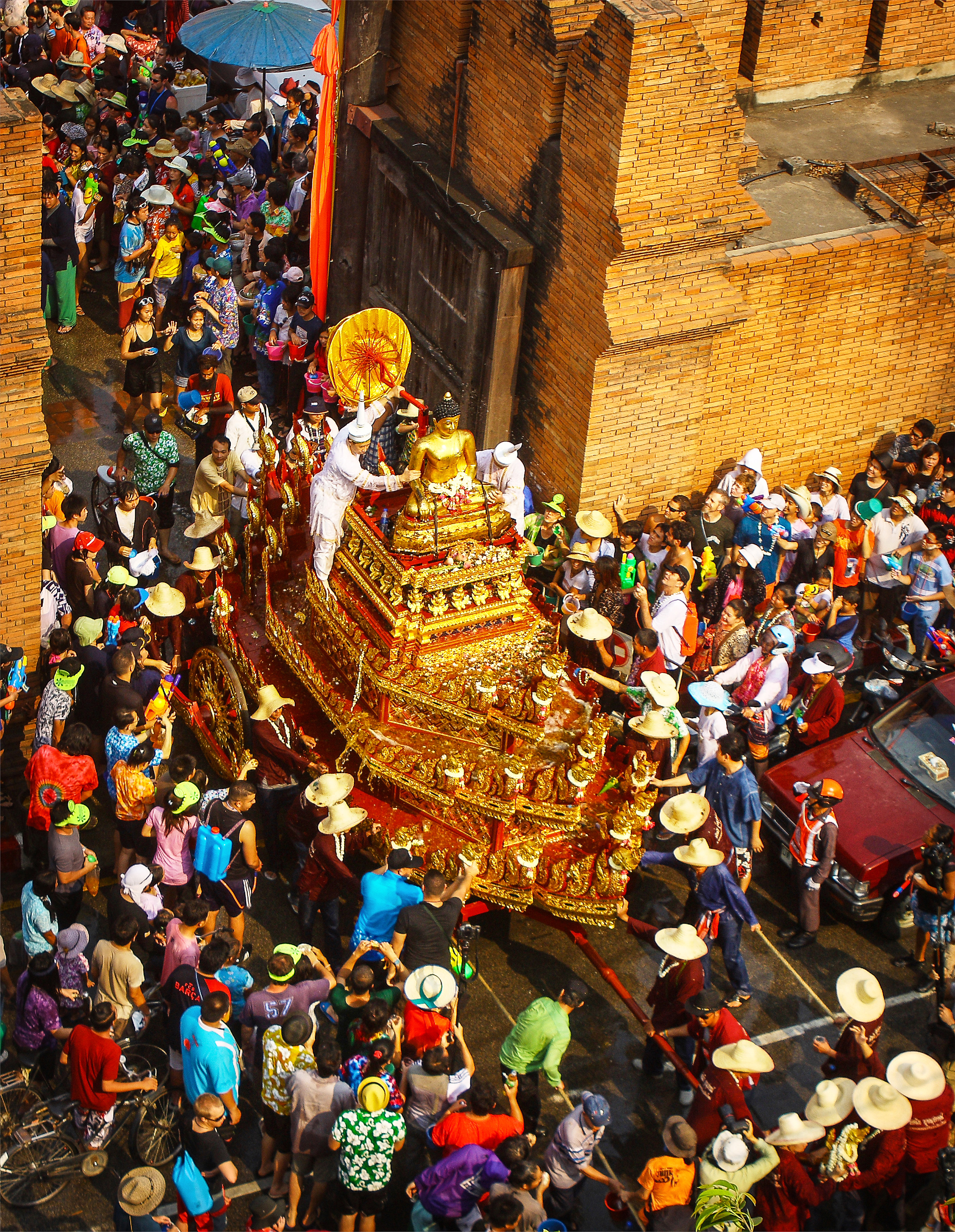
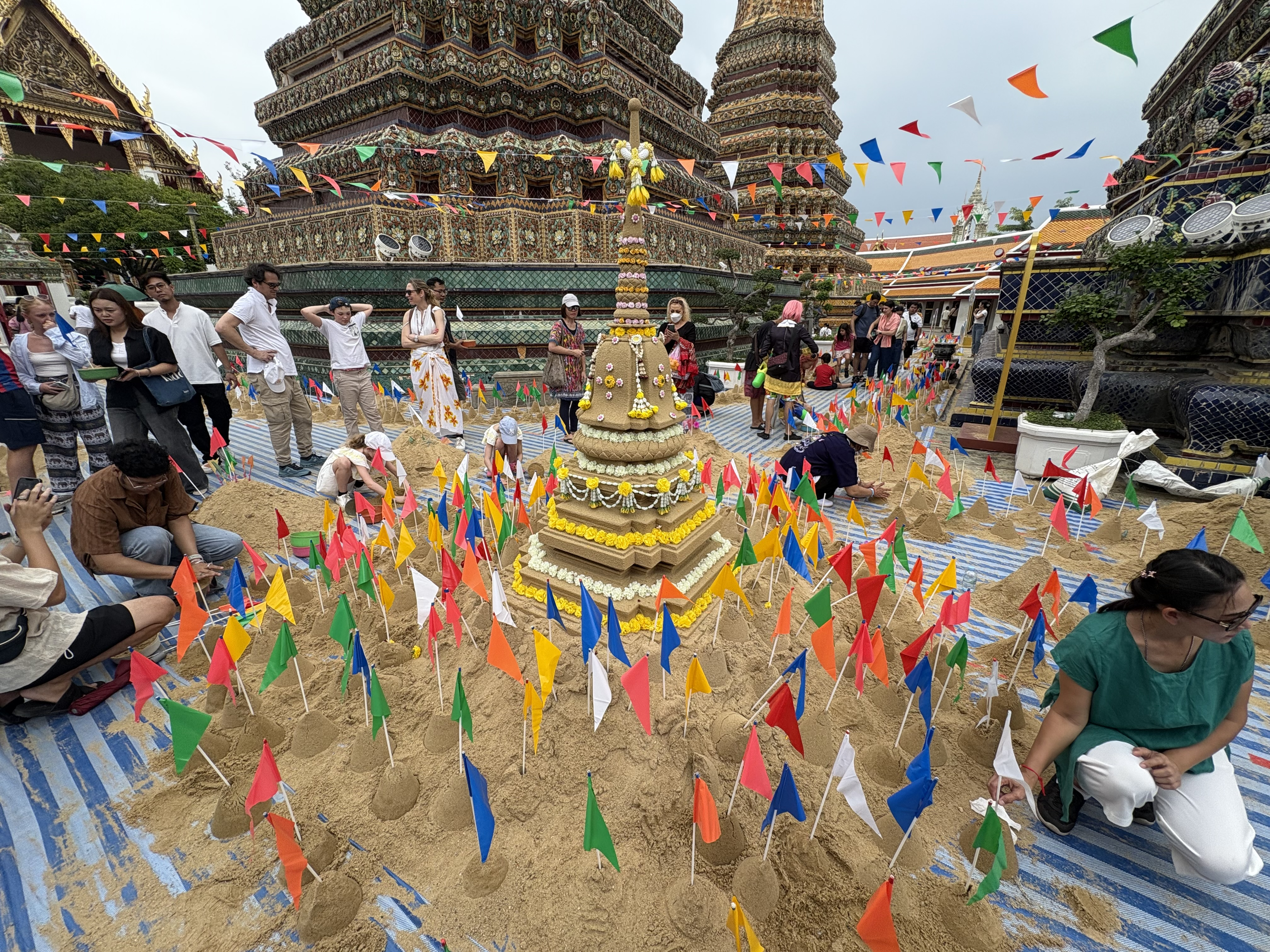
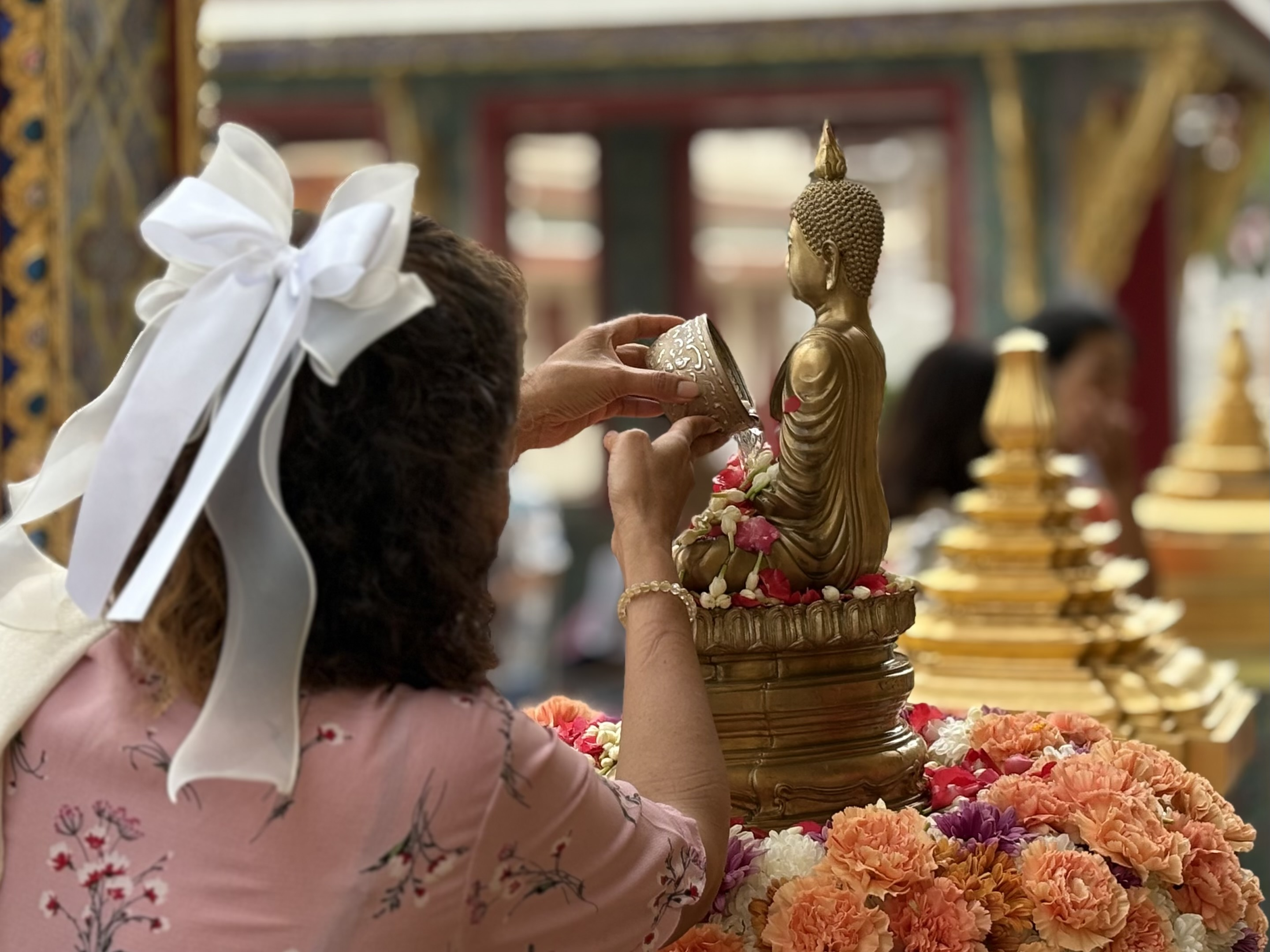
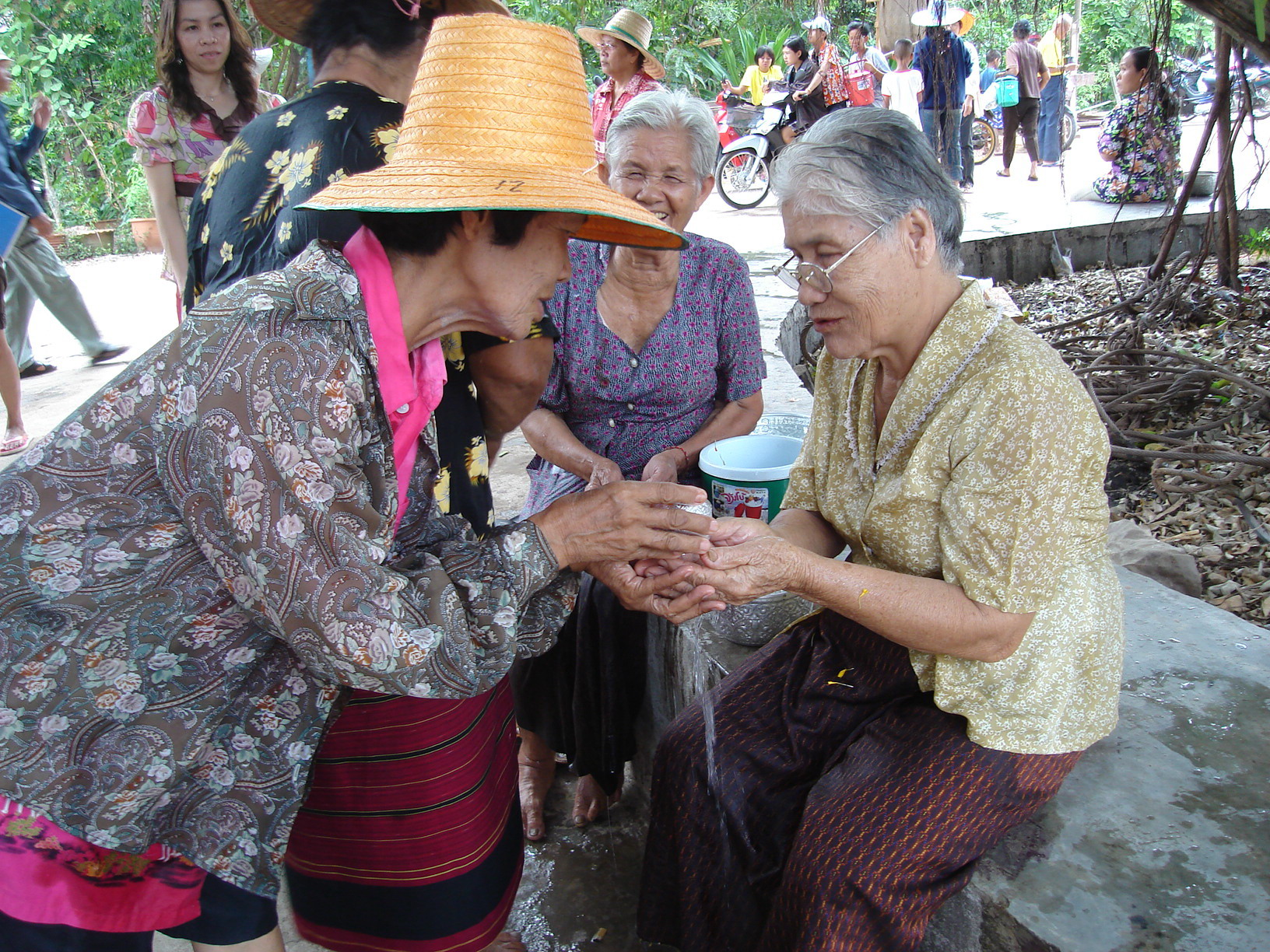
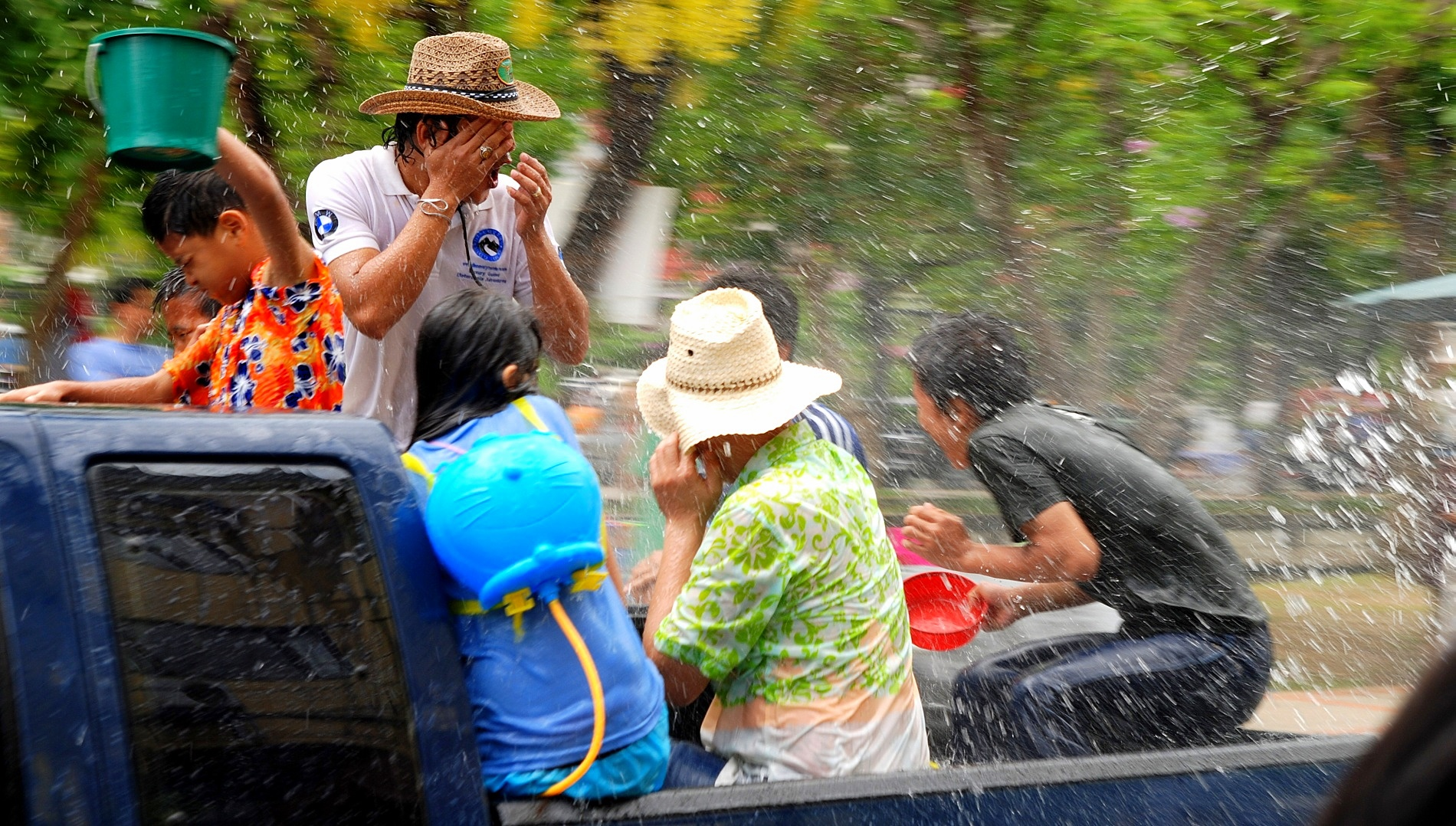
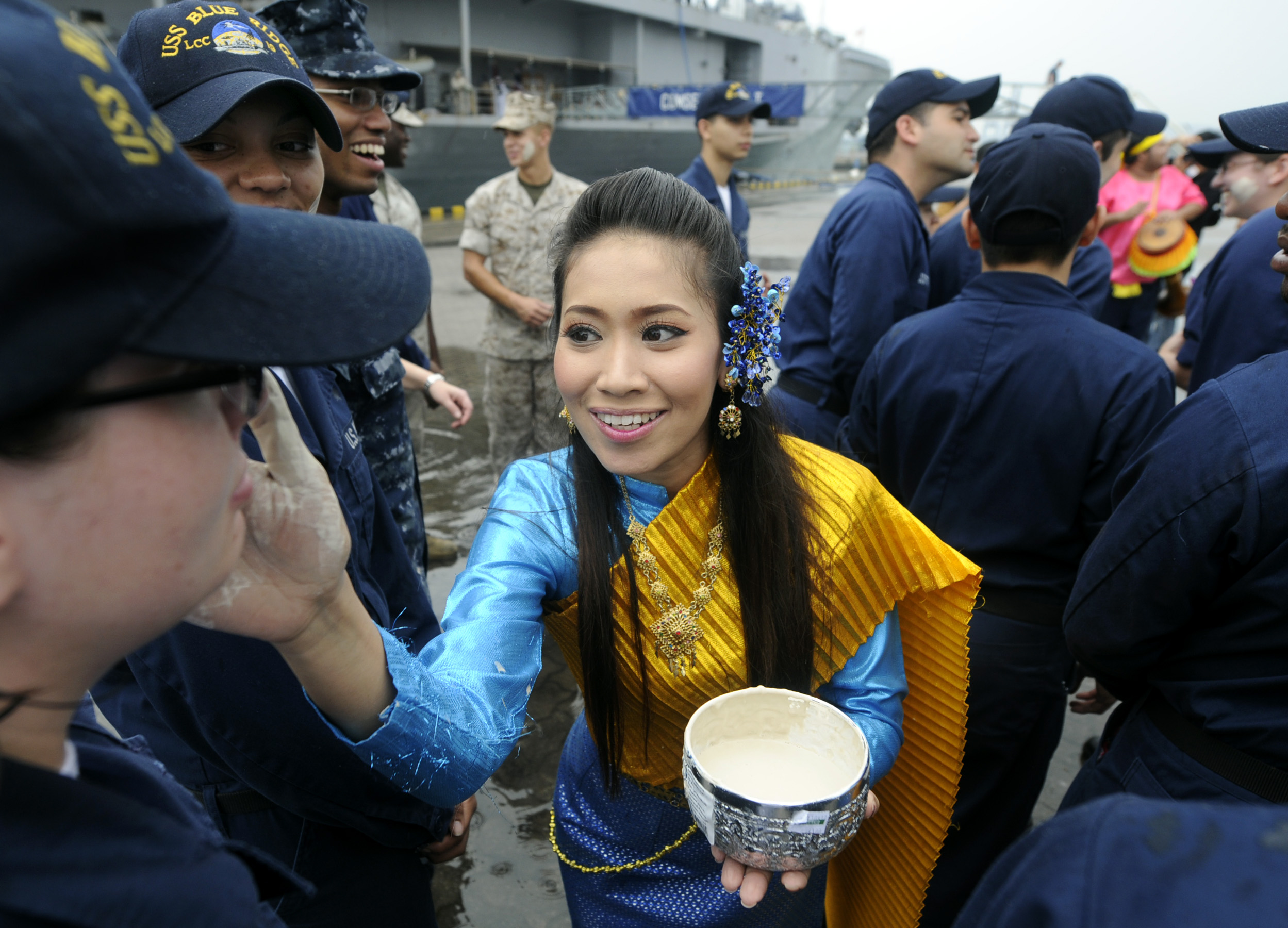
- Celebrations of Songkran; from right to left and top to bottom: Songkran Festival at the ancient city wall in Chiang Mai; Building sand stupas at Wat Pho in Bangkok; Bathing of a Buddha statue at Wat Ratchabophit in Bangkok; Rot Nam Dam Hua or รดน้ำดำหัว (Thai New Year tradition of pouring water over elders' hands for blessings) in Ban Khung Taphao, Uttaradit; Water fights in Chiang Mai; Pasting white powder on a US Navy officer's face during Songkran
- Official name: Songkran Festival
- Observed by: Thailand
- Type: Asian festival
- Begins: 14 April
- Ends: 16 April
- Date: 13 April
- Duration: 3 days
- Frequency: Annual
- Related to: South and Southeast Asian solar New Year

Songkran in Thailand, traditional Thai New Year festival
- UNESCO Intangible Cultural Heritage
- Country: Thailand
- Reference: 01719
- Region: Asia and the Pacific

Inscription history
- Inscription: 2023 (18th session)
- List: Representative

Thai New Year, also known as Songkran (Thai: สงกรานต์, pronounced [sǒŋ.krāːn]), or the Songkran Festival (Songkran Splendours), is the Thai New Year's national holiday. It is celebrated annually on 13 April, with the holiday period extending from 14 to 15 April.

The festival aligns with New Year celebrations observed in many South and Southeast Asian cultures, following the Theravada Buddhist calendar, and coincides with related observances in the Hindu calendar.

In Thailand, the New Year is officially observed on 1 January. Songkran was the official New Year until 1888, when it was changed to 1 April, before being shifted to 1 January in 1940. The traditional Thai New Year, Songkran, remains a national holiday. Celebrations are known for public water fights, which symbolize ritual cleansing. The festival has become popular among international visitors and contributes significantly to tourism.

In 2024, UNESCO certified Songkran as part of humanity's intangible cultural heritage list.

== Etymology ==
Songkran is a Thai word, derived from Sanskrit Saṅkrānti (संक्रान्ति), meaning "to move", "movement", "the passing of", or "astrological passage". The term refers to the movement of the sun from one position to another in the zodiac.

In Sanskrit usage, a saṅkrānti occurs monthly; however, in Thailand, the term Songkran specifically refers to the period when the sun moves from Pisces to Aries. This period is more precisely known as Maha Songkran ("great Songkran"), marking the traditional New Year.

The Songkran festival is therefore a celebration of the New Year based on the solar calendar. The festivities traditionally span three days: 13 April, known as Maha Songkran (Thai: วันมหาสงกรานต์), marks the sun's entry into Aries and the end of the old year; 14 April, called Wan Nao (Thai: วันเนา), is the transitional day; and 15 April, Wan Thaloeng Sok (Thai: วันเถลิงศก "to begin a new era or year"), is observed as New Year's day.

== Dates ==
In 1989, the Thai cabinet fixed the dates of Songkran to 12–14 April, despite the traditionally calculated starting time being 13 April at 20:57. (Note: The cabinet later fixed this issue by shifting the holiday by one day to 13–15 April, which is still in use today.) Historically, Songkran was determined using the method described in Suriyayart (Thai: สุริยยาตร์), the Thai adaptation of the Surya Siddhanta. The festival begins when the Sun enters Aries in the sidereal zodiac system, an event known as Maha Songkran Day (Thai: วันมหาสงกรานต์).

The final day marks the beginning of the new solar year and is called Wan Thaloengsok Day (Thai: วันเถลิงศก). During this period, astrologers, both local and royal, make predictions about the economy, agriculture, rainfall, and political affairs based on observations made between these days.

On behalf of the monarch, the king or the Chief Royal Astrologer issued an official New Year announcement to the public. This proclamation, known as Prakat Songkran (Thai: ประกาศสงกรานต์, Songkran notification), included details about Songkran, Thaloengsok, the lunisolar calendar, as well as religious and royal ceremonies. The government adhered strictly to this announcement and organized certain ceremonies in accordance with the royal astrologer's calculations. (Note: In 1896, for example, the ceremony started on 12 April. According to Suriyayart, the sun entered Aries at 19:30 on 12 April. The main ceremony started one day later, possibly due to difficulties organizing the ceremony at the exact time. In 1949, Maha Songkran was on 13 April at 12:35 and the ceremony started that day.)

According to the scripture, 800 years equal 292,207 days. (Note: According to Deva Sastri, Bapu (1861). "Translation of the Surya Siddhanta" (PDF). C B Lewis and the Baptist Mission Press, Calcutta. Sloka 37, there are 1,577,917,828 solar (or terrestrial, as the translator chose) day within one great Yuga, or eon. There are four yugas, or periods, within the aeon. All of them spans 4,320,000 solar years (Sloka 15–16). It follows that 800 solar years correspond to 292,207 days.) In other words, a solar year consists of 292,207 kammaja (Thai: กัมมัช; lit. "that which is produced by karma"), where 1 kammaja equals 108 seconds and 800 kammaja correspond to one solar day. Timekeeping begins with the start of the Kali Yuga in 3102 BCE (−3101 CE).

At the beginning of each year, the number of days elapsed since the start of the Kali Yuga can be calculated using the following formula:

$$SD = \frac{292207 \times \left(KE\right)}{800} = \frac{292207 \times \left(CE + 3101\right)}{800} = \frac{292207 \times \left(BE + 2558\right)}{800},$$

where $KE$, $CE$, and $BE$ denote the Kali Era, Common Era, and Buddhist Era, respectively. $SD$ is the Suriyayart day number, which varies depending on the calendar era used. The integer part represents the number of days at New Year's Day, while the remainder indicates the time at which the new year begins, measured in kammaja from the previous midnight.

Because the resulting day number is very large, additional calendar eras were introduced to simplify calculations, including the Minor Era (ME). Year 0 ME corresponds to 1181 BE, 638 CE, or 3739 KE. Substituting this into the formula gives 1,365,702 days since the start of the Kali Yuga, with a remainder of 373 kammaja. This means the new year began 373/800 of a day after midnight, or 11 hours, 11 minutes, and 24 seconds. In the proleptic Gregorian calendar, this corresponds to 11:11:24 on Sunday, 25 March 638 CE.

The Julian day of the New Year can be computed as:

$$JD_\mathrm{newyear} = \frac{\left(292207 \times ME\right) + 373}{800} + 1954167.5 = \frac{\left(292207 \times \left(CE-638\right)\right) + 373}{800} + 1954167.5,$$

This value can then be converted into a calendar date using a standard algorithm (see Julian day). Maha Songkran Day may be determined either through a more complex procedure or by subtracting 2.165 days (2 days, 3 hours, 57 minutes, and 36 seconds) from $JD_\mathrm{newyear}$. This yields:

$$JD_\mathrm{songkran} = \frac{\left(292207 \times ME\right) -1732}{800} + 1954167.5 = \frac{\left(292207 \times \left(CE-638\right)\right) -1732}{800} + 1954167.5.$$

A solar year equals 292,207 kammaja or 365.25875 days. By comparison, a Gregorian year averages 292,194 kammaja. (Note: Julian year lasts 292,200 kammajas on average) The difference of 13 kammaja (23 minutes, 24 seconds) accumulates annually, causing Songkran to shift later in the calendar year. For example, Maha Songkran fell on 7 April in 1600, 9 April in 1700, 10 April in 1800, 12 April in 1900, and 13 April in 2000. It will also fall on 15 April in 2100, 17 April in 2200, 18 April in 2300, 19 April in 2400 and 21 April in 2500.

In modern practice, the royal palace no longer issues the Prakat Songkran, instead providing a small calendar booklet to the public on New Year's Day. The Government Savings Bank continues to produce a one-page lunisolar calendar, distinct from the commonly used multi-page solar calendar. This calendar features an image of Nang Songkran with her vehicle and attendants, led by a Chinese zodiac animal holding a flag with its Thai name. It also includes detailed information on the correct Songkran date and religious observances. Some astrologers, particularly in northern Thailand, still issue their own Songkran announcements with predictions and related information.

In 2013, the Chiang Mai Provincial Council decided to reschedule the ceremonies according to the traditional calculation, ignoring the holidays set by the central government. In 2026, many northern provinces, including Chiang Mai and Phrae, rescheduled the ceremony in accordance with the correct computation. The apology ceremony is organized on the final day of the festival to allow government employees to pay respect to the governor and line managers.

The table below lists the start and end dates of the Songkran festival as derived from the formulas above. The Chinese zodiac for each year is also included, as it is used in Thai astrology. However, the Chinese zodiac changes at Lichun, just before the Chinese New Year in February, whereas Thai astrology uses the first day of the fifth lunar month (roughly the new moon in late March to early April). Before this cutoff, astrologers use the zodiac of the previous year.

Maha Songkran and Thaloengsok table
Year	Chinese zodiac	Maha Songkran Songkran starts	Thaloengsok Songkran ends
2021	Ox	14 April 2021; 03:39:36	16 April 2021; 07:37:12
2022	Tiger	14 April 2022; 09:52:12	16 April 2022; 13:49:48
2023	Rabbit	14 April 2023; 16:04:48	16 April 2023; 20:02:24
2024	Dragon	13 April 2024; 22:17:24	16 April 2024; 02:15:00
2025	Snake	14 April 2025; 04:30:00	16 April 2025; 08:27:36
2026	Horse	14 April 2026 10:42:36	16 April 2026 14:40:12
2027	Goat	14 April 2027; 16:55:12	16 April 2027; 20:52:48
2028	Monkey	13 April 2028; 23:07:48	16 April 2028; 03:05:24
2029	Rooster	14 April 2029; 05:20:24	16 April 2029; 09:18:00
2030	Dog	14 April 2030; 11:33:00	16 April 2030; 15:30:36
2031	Pig	14 April 2031; 17:45:36	16 April 2031; 21:43:12

In 2018, the Thai cabinet extended the Songkran holiday nationwide to seven days, from 9 to 16 April, to allow citizens to travel home. In 2019, the same period (9–16 April) was observed because 13 April fell on a Saturday. In 2024, the festival period was further extended, running from 1 to 21 April instead of the traditional three-day celebration.

== Origin and myths ==
The origin of the Songkran festival lies in a Buddhist folk myth or noncanonical jataka related to harvest and spring. In the prosperous city of Sukhavati in Suvannabhumi, Bodistva was born in the household of a poor farmer. Once, Indra the king of Devas, looked at the city from heaven and was saddened by the level of corruption. He found that people did not respect their elders, behaved rudely, and did not give them proper food or medicine. They had no compassion for the needy and helpless, no faith in Sila and Uposath but fun in sin, no faith in donation but greed for wealth, no faith in Dhamma but made business of Dhamma. Seeing the decline of Dhamma, he said, "Glory/Siri of humans lies in their faith in Dhamma. There is no Glory without Dhamma." With the affirmation of this truth, people in the city immediately lost their glory. Rain, water, and food disappeared and extreme drought with skin-burning hot sun waves and dirty, foul-smelling garbage filled their homes.

To be saved from this suffering, with Bodistva's leadership, people prayed to Mother Earth or Siri. They asked Siri the cause of and solution to their misfortune. Out of compassion and sympathy for her children, she told them restoration of their faith in Dhamma would end their suffering. She gave them a divine piece of fertile land, divine seeds, a mysterious song for rain, and pots of divine thanaka powder of several colors to apply on their skin to cool the body from the sun. People pledged to observe sila and upasotha under Bodistva's guidance.

Bodistva and his companions started cultivating the divine land, sowing divine seeds. They used to apply several colours of thanaka powder and water is poured to cool their body from heavy sun waves. In few days their crops were grown that was the day when the sun entered the constellation of Aries. They produced adequate grains. At the day of harvest, they washed feet of their elders, saluted them and served delicious food and proper cloths. Donations were made to needy and helpless. Hence, Dhamma was restored by the people.

Same day when Indra the king of devas again looked at the city of SuvannaBhumi. He praised them and said, "Glory of humans lies in their faith in Dhamma, there is no Glory without Dhamma." By affirmation of this truth immediately their lost glory was restored back and the people elected bodistva as their leader and celebrated the harvest day with throwing water on each other and started playing with several colours of thanaka powder by applying it on each other's body.

Thus, in Buddhist community in South East Asia, to remember and celebrate this day, people clean their houses, salute and show respect to their elders by washing their feet, serving delicious food and proper clothing to them. Donations are made to monastery and needy. People play with water and different colours of thanaka powder is applied to each other's body.

According to the Buddhist scripture of Wat Pho, Songkran originated from the death of Kapila Brahma (กบิลพรหม, Kabilaphrom, 'reddish Brahma'). In the olden days, there was a wealthy man and his neighbor, a drunkard. The drunkard, who had two sons, belittled the rich man for being childless. The rich man was humiliated and beseeched the Sun and the Moon gods to grant him a son. His attempts failed until he offered cooked rice to the tree god living in a banyan tree, who asked Indra to grant the man's wish. The child, named Thammabal (Thai: ธรรมบาล, also Dhammapala, lit. 'one who protects righteousness'), was born.

Thammabal was a clever child who learned three vedas, bird language and also taught people to avoid sin. Kapila Brahma learned of the child and wanted to test the child's cleverness. The god asked, "Where is the glory of men (sri) located in the morning, during the day, and in the evening?". The loser would have his head chopped off. The boy thought in vain for six days, but could not find a solution to the riddles. He lay beneath a sugar palm tree and overheard a conversation between a pair of eagles who planned to eat his corpse when he lost the bet. The female eagle asked her mate whether he knew the answer. He answered, "In the morning, the sri appears on the face, so people wash their faces every morning. At noon, the sri is at the chest where people spray perfume every noon. In the evening, the sri goes to the feet, so people wash their feet every evening." Thmmabal memorized the answer and gave it to Kapila Brahma the next day. Having lost, Kapila Brahma summoned his seven daughters and told them that he must cut his head off. However, if his head fell to earth, it would create an inferno that would engulf the world. If his head was thrown into the air, the rains would stop. And if his head was dropped into the ocean, all seawater would dry up. To prevent these calamities, he told his daughters to place his head on an elevated phan. Thungsa, his eldest child, stored her father's head in the cave in Mount Kailash.

Every year when the Sun enters Aries, one of Kapila Brahma's children, called the Nang Songkran (Thai: นางสงกรานต์, lit. 'Lady Songkran') for that year, and other angels form a procession. One of them takes the phan with Kapila Brahma's head. The lady stands, sits, reclines or sleeps on the back of the animal depending on the time. From the dawn to midday, the lady will stand on the back of her conveyance. After midday until the sunset, she will sit down. Between the sunset and midnight, the lady lies down on her vehicle but leaves her eyes open. After midnight, she sleeps. These postures and other details were previously drawn as part of the Prakat Songkran and now as part of the lunisolar calendar. The procession lasts for 60 minutes around Mount Meru. This is subsequently called Maha Songkran to distinguish from other Songkran that occur when the Sun moves from one to another zodiac. For simplicity, the name was later shortened as Songkran.

The following table lists the names and characteristics of Nang Songkran, which vary according to which day of the week Maha Songkran falls on in each year.

Day of Week and corresponding colour	Name	Flower	Jewellery stone	Food	Right hand	Left hand	Conveyance
Sunday	Dungsha Devi/Thungsa Thewi	Pomegranate flowers	Ruby	Fig	Discus	Conch	Garuda
Monday	Gōrāgha Devi/Khorakha Thewi	Cork tree flowers	Moonstone	Oil	Sword	Staff	Tiger
Tuesday	Rākshasa Devi/Raksot Thewi	Lotus flower	Agate	Blood	Trident	Bow	Pig
Wednesday	Maṇdā Devi/Mantha Thewi	Champak flowers	Cat's eye	Butter	Stylus	Staff	Donkey
Thursday	Kiriṇī Devi/Kirini Thewi	Magnolia	Emerald	Nuts and sesame seeds	Hook	Bow	Elephant
Friday	Kimidā Devi/Kimitha Thewi	Water lilies	Topaz	Banana	Sword	Lute	Buffalo
Saturday	Mahodharā Devi/Mahothon Thewi	Water hyacinth flowers	Blue sapphire	Hog deer meat	Discus	Trident	Peacock

== In historical records ==
In De Beschryving van Japan (The History of Japan) handwritten in 1690 by Engelbert Kaempfer in the reign of King Phetracha of Ayutthaya Kingdom, it is said of Songkran in old-17th century Dutch :-

"The Siamites celebrate the first and fifteenth day of every month, being the days of the new and full moon. Some also go to the Pagods every first day of the quarter, which in some measure answers to our Sunday. They have besides several yearly solemn festivals, as for instance, one at the beginning of the year, call’d Sonkraen, ..." (Note: De Siamiten vieren den ecrſtcn en vyſtienden dag der maand, zynde de dagen der nieuwe en volle maan. Sommige gaan ook op den cerſtcn dag van de kwartier maanen na de Pagoden, 't welk eeniger maaten overeenkomt met onzen Zondag. Behalven deze hebben zy fommige jaarlykſche plechtige Feeſtdagen, by voorbeeld een in 't begin van 't jaar, genaamt Sonkraen, ...")

— Engelbert Kaempfer (Hand-written in 1690), De beschryving van Japan. (Translated in 1727 by Johann Caspar Scheuchzer).

In the reign of King Borommakot (1733–58), there was recorded of ancient royal ceremonies of Siamese New Year observance called Songkran Day, the tradition-inherited from past generations of King of Ayutthaya Kingdom such ceremonies as, royal forming of sand stupa with royal ornaments, sprinkling the water onto the statues of Buddha and graven images, offering food to monks, procession of sand stupas parade to temples, royal musical fanfares, and also establishing the almshouse assignment subsequently, said in the Concise Royal Chronicle of Ayutthaya Kingdom of royal forming the sand stupa in the reign of King Borommakot:-

After the royal ceremony of Phra Sai at Wat Phra Si Sanphet, the next day was Wan Nao. The royal officials offered the sands and a big tray to the Majesty King to form the sand in the shape of stupa (Phra Sai) with five hollow spears of the sky at the Song Peun Throne Hall. The royal officials moved King's sand stupa (Phra Sai) to the painter for decorating the British gold on it and the royal officials then moved it to place at the Song Peun Throne Hall. After the Buddhist monks had already eaten their morning meals, the royal officials moved to move (Phra Sai) King's sand stupa (Phra Sai) to place in the pavilion "Lukkhun Thai Sara". The three colonels named Put, Thep Rat and Chan marched the parade with the pairs of flocks by walking and riding the horses. The royal officials produced melodies with the flutes and victory drums, Malaya drum and Chinese drums and took three jagged-edge flags in the parade to move King's sand stupa (Phra Sai) to Wat Worapho, Wat Pra Ram and Wat Mongkol Bophit as the inherited tradition. (Note: อนึ่งเมื่อครั้ง (แผ่นดิน) สมเด็จพระพุทธเจ้าหลวงในพระบรมโกศนั้น ครั้นวันขึ้นปีใหม่โหรถวายฤกษ์เป็นวันมหาสงกรานต์ เจ้าพนักงานได้ก่อพระทรายหน้าพระวิหารหลวงวัดพระศรีสรรเพ็ชญ์...และเครื่องราชวัติฉัตรธงเครื่องประดับพระทรายนั้น เจ้าพนักงานได้เบิกสิ่งของให้แก่ช่างเขียนทำ และพระทรายนั้นช่างเขียนได้ตัด [เขียนตัดเส้นระบายสี หรือตัดพระทรายให้เป็นรูปทรง] ครั้นรุ่งขึ้นเพลาเช้าวันมหาสงกรานต์ ล้นเกล้าล้นกระหม่อมเสด็จไป ณ พระวิหารใหญ่ด้วย [พระวิหารหลวงวัดพระศรีสรรเพ็ชญ์ หลังกลาง] นิมนต์พระสงฆ์ราชาคณะอธิการวัด ได้ฉัน ณ พระวิหารใหญ่ฉลองพระทราย และที่พระ(ทราย)มหาธาตุและพระทรายบริวารนั้น วิเศษแต่งเทียนและบายศรี (มี) เทียนทองคำขวัญบูชาพระทรายองค์ละสำรับ ครั้นเสร็จ (งาน) พระทรายที่วัดพระศรีสรรเพ็ชญ์แล้วรุ่งขึ้นเป็นวันเนา เจ้าพนักงานจึงเอาทรายและเตียงเข้าไปให้ล้นเกล้าล้นกระหม่อมทรงก่อพระทราย ณ พระที่นั่งทรงปืน...ทรงก่อแล้วพนักงานยกพระทรายออกให้ช่างเขียนตัด และเครื่องประดับพระพรายนั้นให้เจ้าพนักงานปิดทองอังกฤษประดับ และช่าง [ช่างเขียน] เขียนทำประดับประดาพระทราย แล้วยกเข้าไปตั้งไว้ ณ พระที่นั่งทรงปืน ครั้นรุ่งขึ้นเพลาเช้าวันเถลิงศกเสด็จ ฯ ออกฉลองพระเจดีย์ทราย เตียงยกพระที่นั่งทรงปืน พระสงฑ์ฉันเสร็จแล้ว เจ้าพนักงานยกพระทรายออกมาตั้งไว้ ณ ศาลาลูกขุนท้ายสระ พันพุฒ พันเทพราช พันจันท์ เกณฑ์เครื่องเล่นและคู่แห่เดินเท้าและม้า ปี่กลองชนะ ธงสามชาย ปีกลองมลายู ปี่กลองจีนแห่พระทรายไปไว้ ฯ วัดวรโพธิ์ วัดพระราม วัดมงคลบพิตร (เป็น) อย่างธรรมเนียมสืบมาแต่ก่อน (ดังนี้))

— The Concise Chronicle Chapter 69 of Krung Sri Ayutthaya Part I, recorded in 1783 Year of Rabbit, the 2nd year in the reign of King Rama I, Rattanakosin era.

There was a contemporary archive mentioned Songkran festival of Siam in reign of King Mongkut. The archive written in 1854 by Jean-Baptiste Pallegoix, a priest of the Société des Missions Etrangères who was assigned as Coadjutor Vicar Apostolic and lived in Siam. Said in French:-

"During the year, Siamese also have several days of civil or religious festivals, which they celebrate with great splendor: 1°Songkran; it is Siamese New Year, which usually falls in April (fifth month in brahman calendar); it held an observance for three days; Siamese people's able to acknowledge horoscope from astrologers whether the angel of the year to ride a tiger, an ox, a bear, a horse, a goat, a dragon or other animals during this festival only." (Note: Ils ont en outre, durant le cours de l'année, plusieurs jours de fêtes civiles ou religieuses, qu'ils célèbrent avec grande pompe : 1°Songkran; c'est leur nouvel an, qui tombe ordinairement dans leur cinquième mois; on le célèbre pendant trois jours; ce n'est qu'à cette époque que le peuple apprend des astro-logues, si l'ange de l'année monte un tigre, un bœuf, un ours, un cheval; une chèvre, un dragon ou quelque autre animal.)

— Jean-Baptiste Pallegoix, Description du Royaume Thai ou Siam. (1854).

== Practices ==
The Songkran celebration is rich with symbolic traditions. Mornings begin with merit-making. Visiting local temples and offering food to the Buddhist monks is commonly practiced. On this specific occasion, performing water pouring on elders' hands is a traditional ritual, known as Rod Nam Dam Hua (Thai: รดน้ำดำหัว), literally, "pouring water to wash the head", representing purification and the washing away of one's sins and bad luck. Another purification ritual is Song Nam Phra (Thai: สรงน้ำพระ) or "bathing the Buddha", where Buddha images like statues are bathed with water. These images can be found in temples, homes and public spaces like malls. The water used in both rituals is a traditional scented water known as Nam Ob (Thai: น้ำอบ), which is mainly jasmine-scented, however the petals or essences of roses, Champaka and other fragrant flowers can also be added in..As a festival of unity, people who have moved away usually return home to their loved ones and elders. Paying reverence to ancestors is an important part of Songkran tradition.

The holiday is known for its Water Festival. Major streets are closed to traffic, and are used as arenas for water fights. Celebrants, young and old, participate in this tradition by splashing water on each other. Additionally, it is common in all regions for people to use marl clay, known in Thai as Din Sor Pong (Thai: ดินสอพอง), as a form of body decoration or protection against the heat and sun. This clay is also used to mark other people during festivities. Traditional parades are held nation-wide and in some venues beauty pageants and parades are held where people can be crowned as "Lady Songkran" or "Miss Songkran", where contestants are clothed in traditional Thai dress. For the general public, floral shirts or a Hawaiian shirt are popular clothing items worn during this festival due to their colourful nature.

=== Regional practices ===
In the Central region, people clean their houses and belongings when Songkran approaches. During the holiday, people often dress up in colorful clothing or Thai dress. After offering food as alms to Buddhist monks, people will offer a requiem to their ancestors and receive blessings. During Songkran, many people make also Buddhist merit through offerings other than food as alms such as sand or other materials to temples for construction or repair alongside temple supplies like candles, incense and medicine. Other forms of merit-making include the ritual release of birds, buffaloes, fish, or other animals, and building sand stupas.

Phra Pradaeng hosts traditional ceremonies of the Mon people such as parades in colourful traditional outfits and folklore performances.

Ban Hat Siew in Si Satchanalai District hosts the 'Elephant Procession Ordination' event on 7 April, where a colourful parade where men dressed in the traditional clothes are taken to the temples on elephants. In northern Thailand 13 April is celebrated with gunfire or firecrackers to repel bad luck. On the next day, people prepare food and useful things to offer to the monks at the temple. People have to go to temple to make merit and bathe Buddha's statue and after that they pour water on the hands of elders and ask for their blessings.

At Tham Rong in Ban Lat District, Phetchaburi Province, a Songkran celebration is held on bullock carts, with carts drawn by oxen. The event promotes the local cultural identity of Phetchaburi, where the traditional wua lan (วัวลาน, [wua laːn], "bull racing") is practiced. The highlight is water splashing on the bullock wagons. In 2026, the event is being held for the second consecutive year, featuring as many as 50 carts. There are also cultural performances, demonstrations of over 30 local dishes, and more than 200 community stalls selling local products.

In Bangkok, Khao San Road and Silom Road with Siam Square are the hubs for modern celebration of Songkran. The roads are closed for traffic, and posts equipped with water guns and buckets full of water. The party runs day and night. Another popular Songkran location is Thawi Watthana Road, also commonly known as Liab Khlong Thawi Watthana Road, which runs alongside Khlong Thawi Watthana in the western outskirts of Bangkok. However, this area has frequently faced annual issues related to the lack of order among participants engaging in water-splashing activities during the Songkran Festival. Due to its proximity to a royal residential area and several housing estates, concerns regarding safety, traffic disruption, and public order have persisted each year. As a result, in 2026, the Bangkok Metropolitan Administration (BMA) introduced stricter regulations governing Songkran activities in this area. In addition, Soi Chokchai 4 and Banthat Thong Road have also emerged in recent years as increasingly popular celebration areas in Bangkok.

Songkran in Eastern region is known as "Wan Lai" (วันไหล, [/wan lǎj]), which literally means "flowing day." This term refers to the distinctive way the traditional New Year is celebrated here, with festivities continuing after the official national Songkran holiday (April 13–15). The celebration begins in Bang Saen (April 16–17), moves to Pattaya–Na Kluea (April 18–19), and continues on to Sattahip, Rayong, Ban Chang, and other areas, sometimes lasting until the end of April. Wan Lai captures both the lively water-play atmosphere and the symbolic flow of people, joy, and cultural tradition across multiple coastal towns. Locals and tourists alike follow the festivities, enjoying a vibrant, beachside celebration filled with community spirit and local charm. In recent years, Wan Lai celebrations have expanded beyond the eastern provinces and can now be found in various regions across Thailand. For example, similar post-Songkran water festivities are held at Bang Boet Beach in Pathio District, Chumphon Province, as well as in Pathum Thani Province in the Bangkok metropolitan area. Within Bangkok itself, Wan Lai-style celebrations also take place in areas such as Phahurat–Wat Liap on Rattanakosin Island, reflecting the broader nationwide adaptation of extended Songkran traditions.

At the festival of Songkran, which marks the beginning of the old Siamese solar year, it is the custom to bathe the images of the Buddha and also the monks and old people. The young folk make this an occasion for throwing water over each other amidst much fun and laughter.

— Peter Anthony Thompson B.A., A.M., I.C.E., Late of The Royal Survey Department, Siam., Lotus Land: Being an Account of the Country and the People of Southern Siam, July 1906.

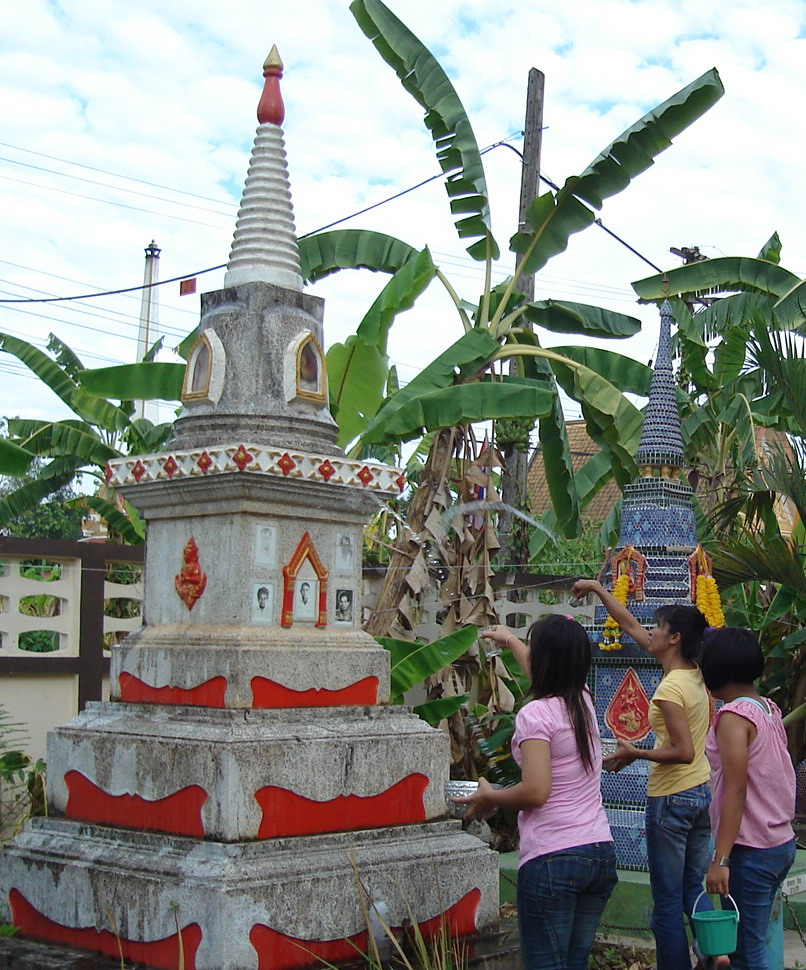
Buddhist takes a bath ancestor pagoda in Songkran festival, Uttaradit.

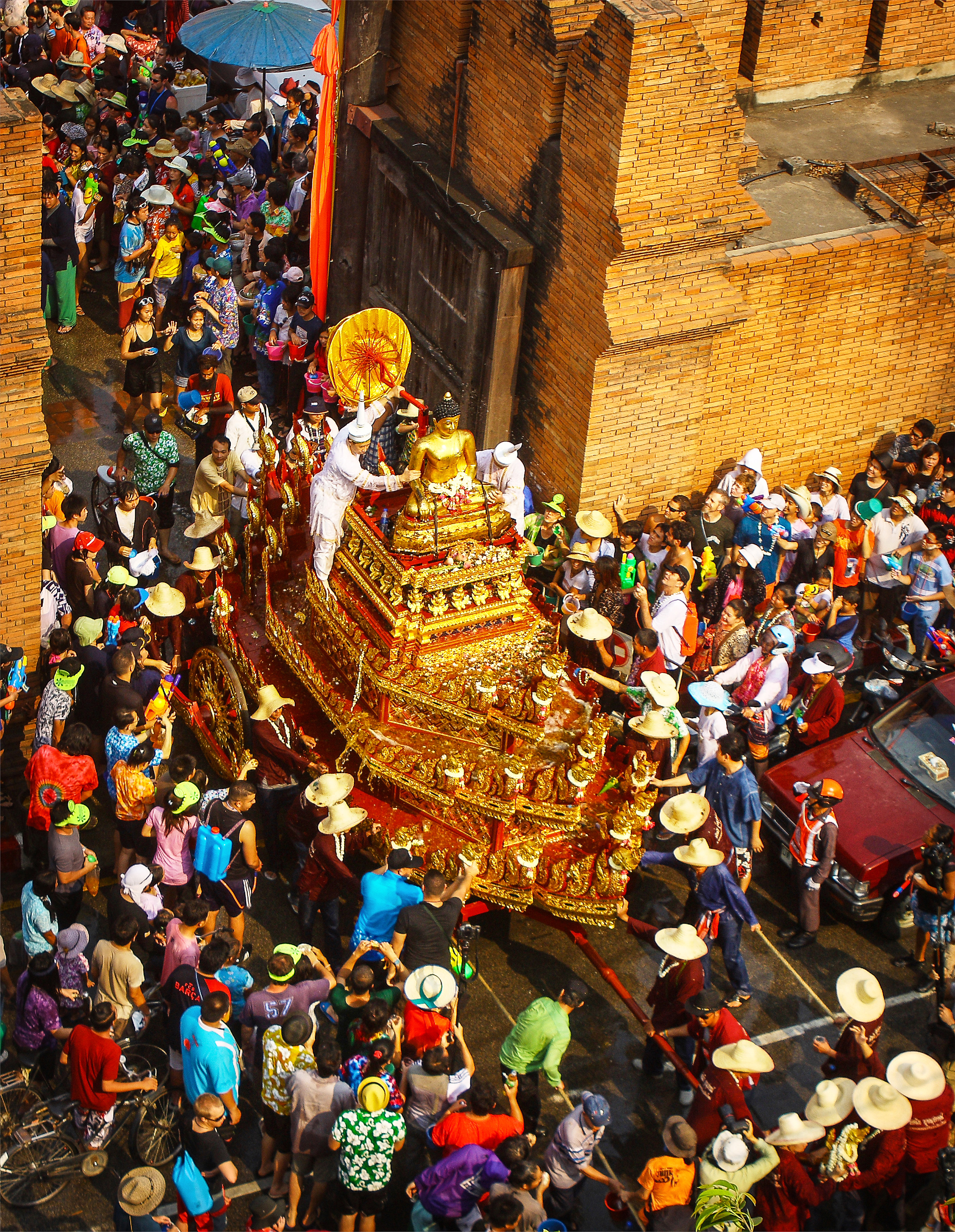
Songkran festival, Chiang Mai's ancient city wall

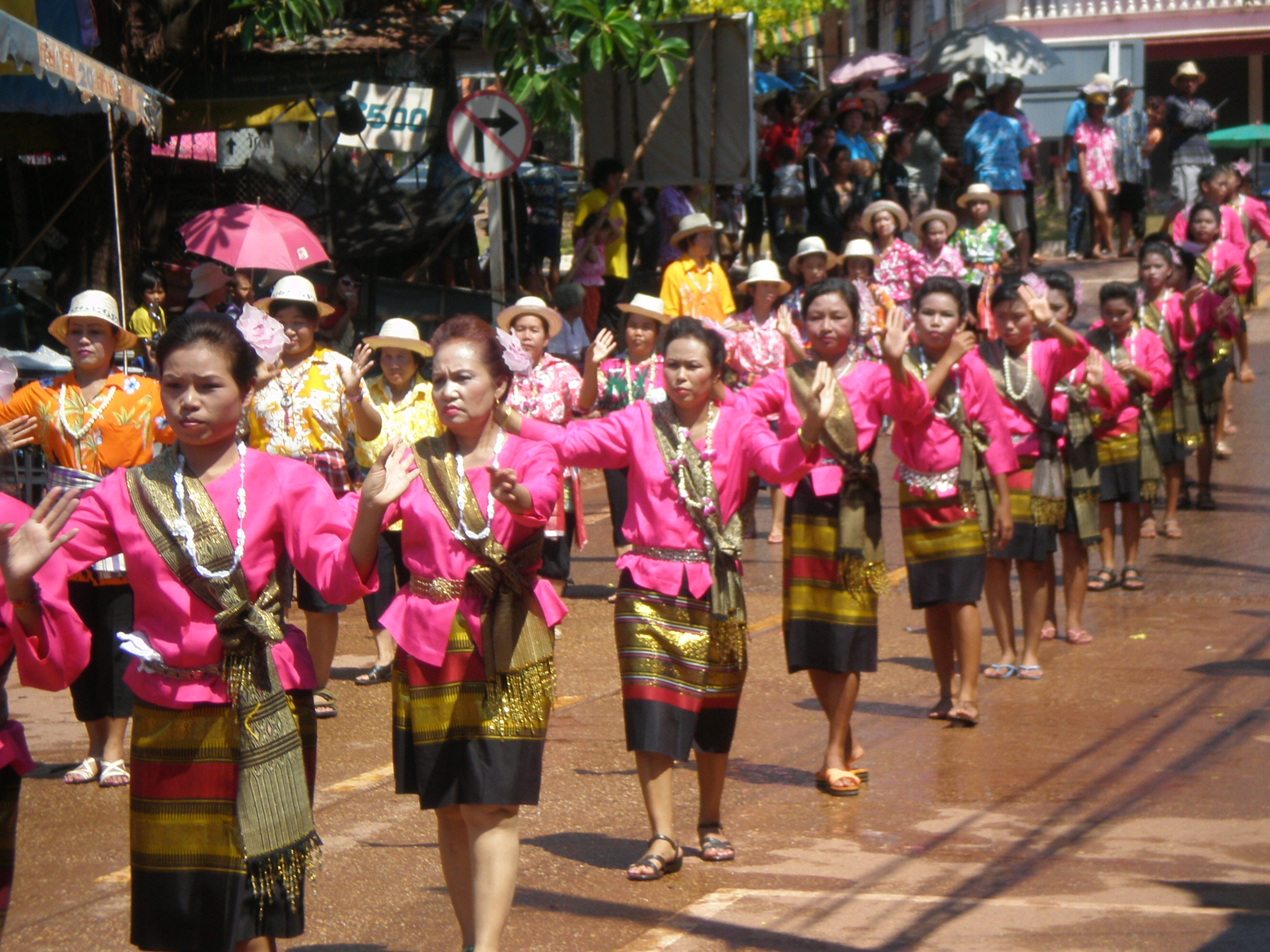
Dancers in Isan traditional dress during Songkran festival, Bueng Kan

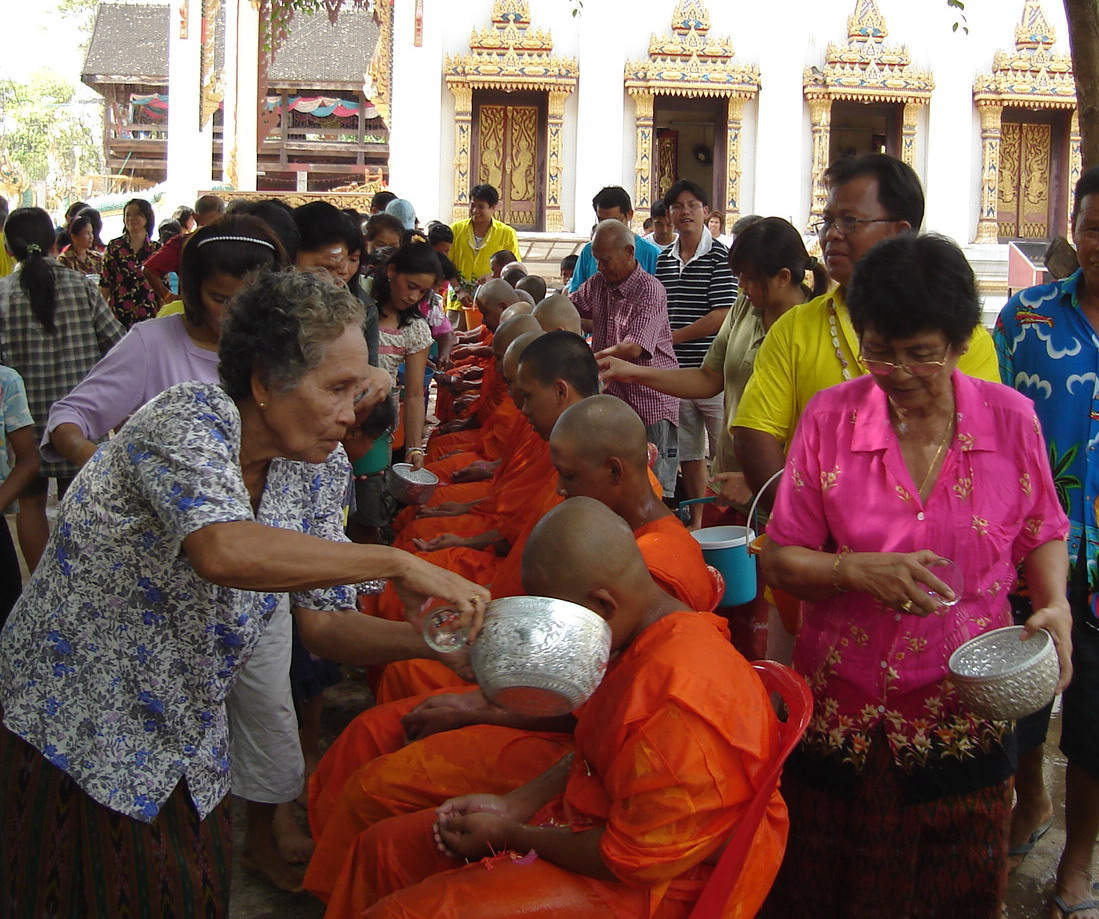
Monks receiving blessing at a temple in Ban Khung Taphao

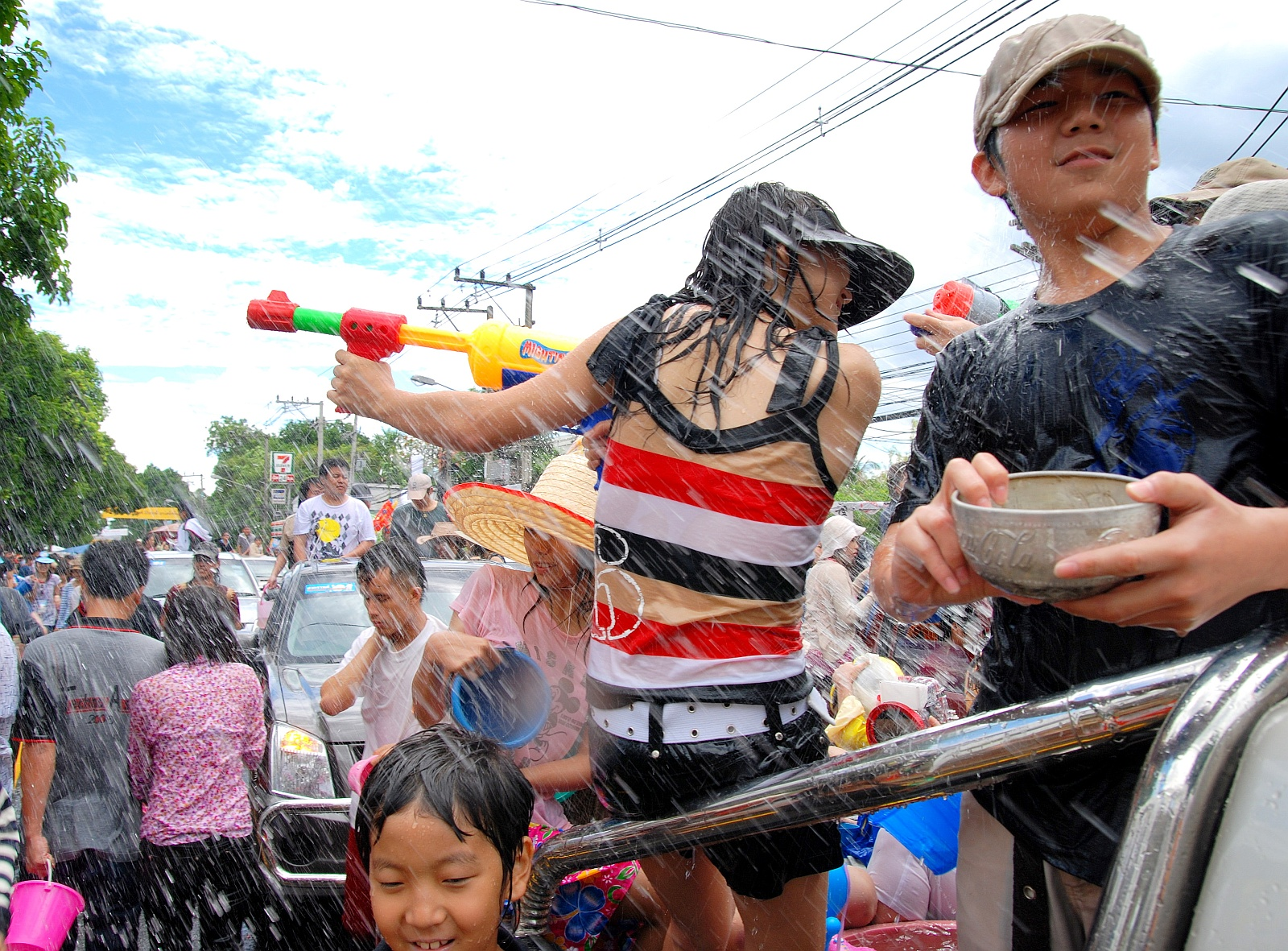
Water fights along the west moat, Chiang Mai, Thailand

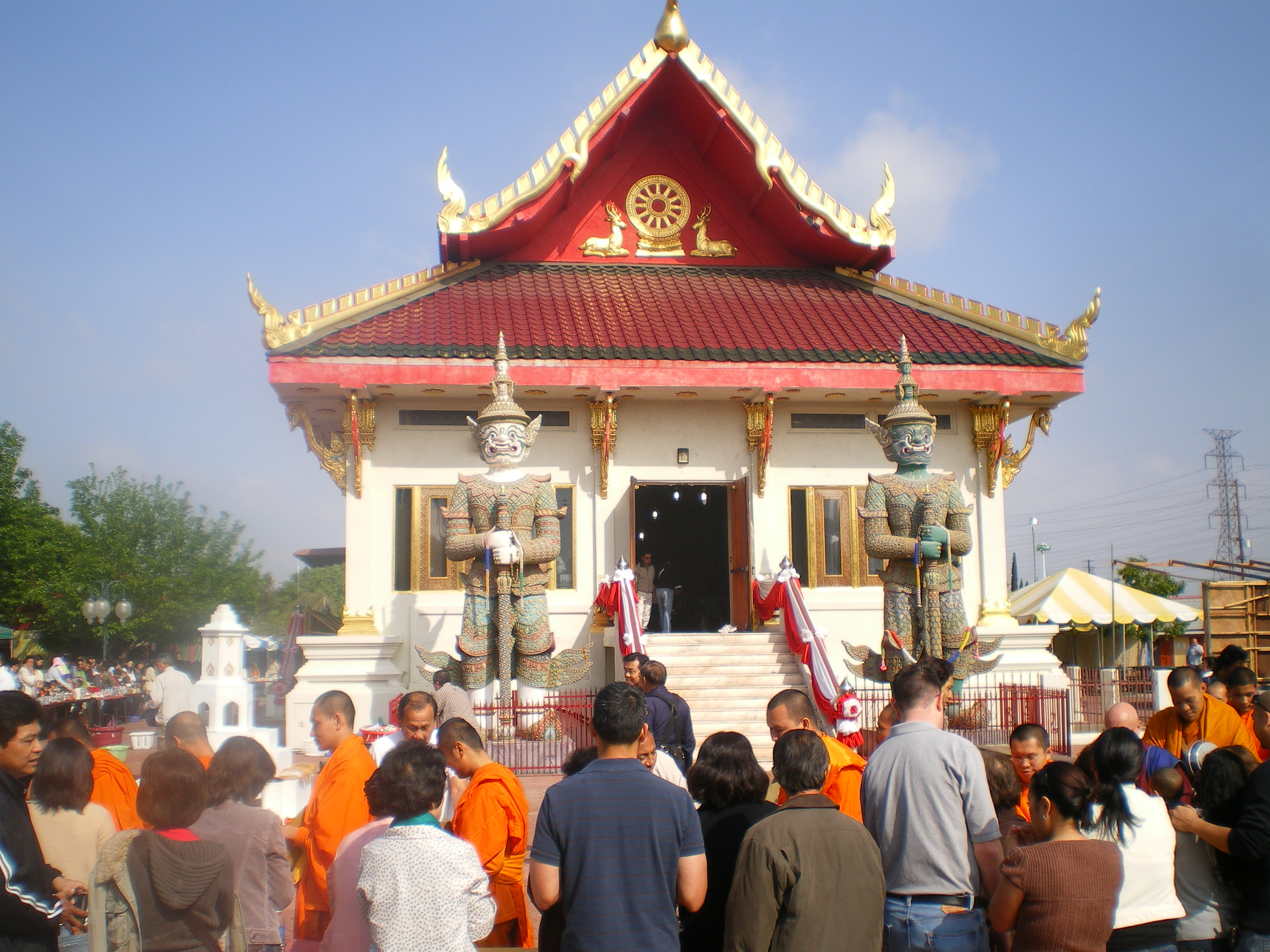
Songkran at Wat Thai, Los Angeles

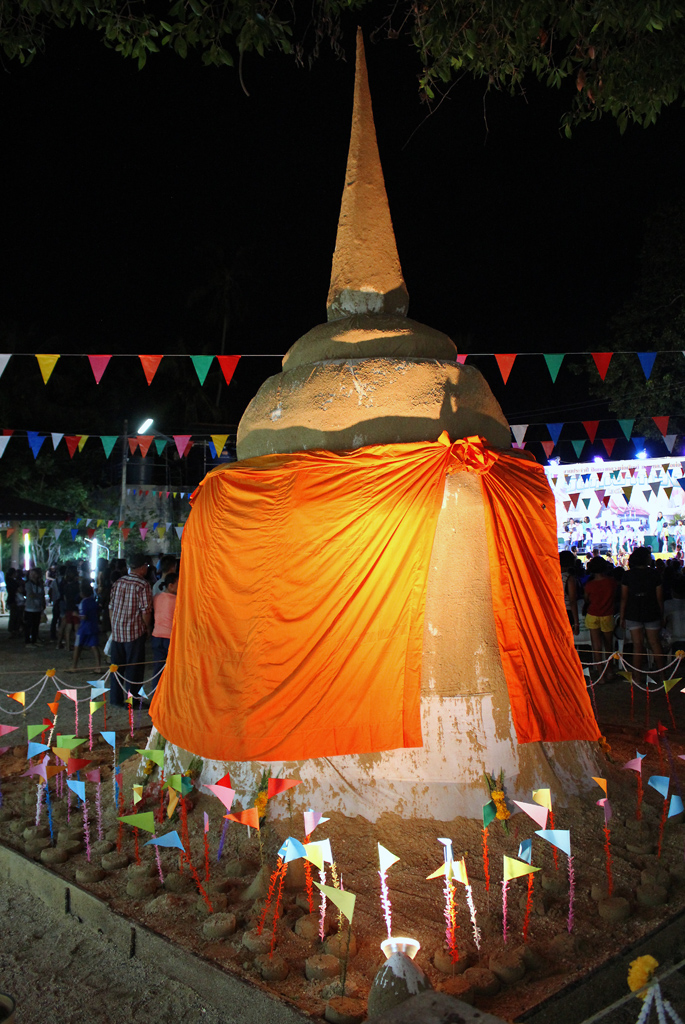
Songkran symbolic sand pagodas in temple, Wat Phu Khao Thong, Ban Maenam, Koh Samui

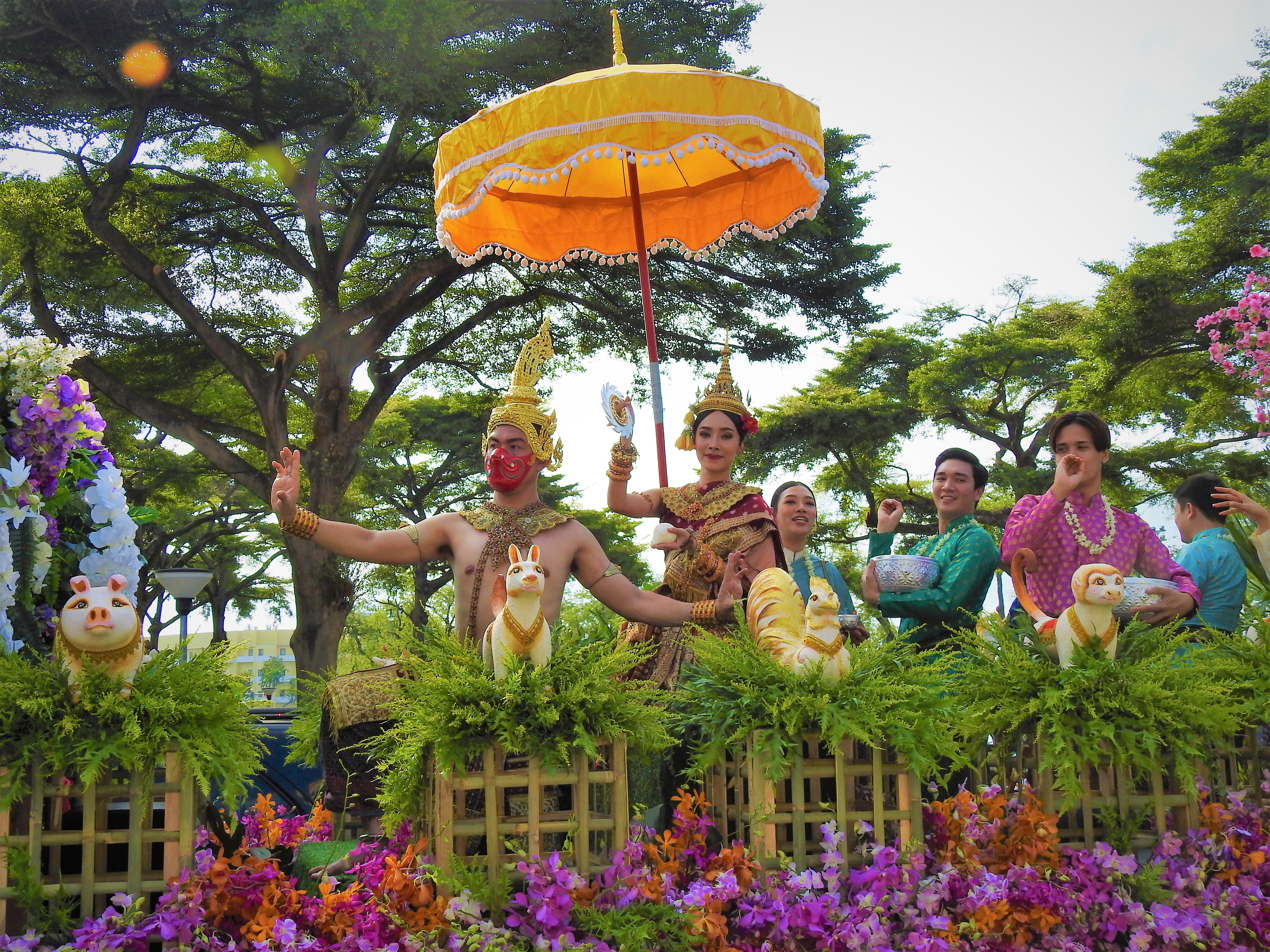
Group of Thai traditional dancer in Songkran festival, Bangkok

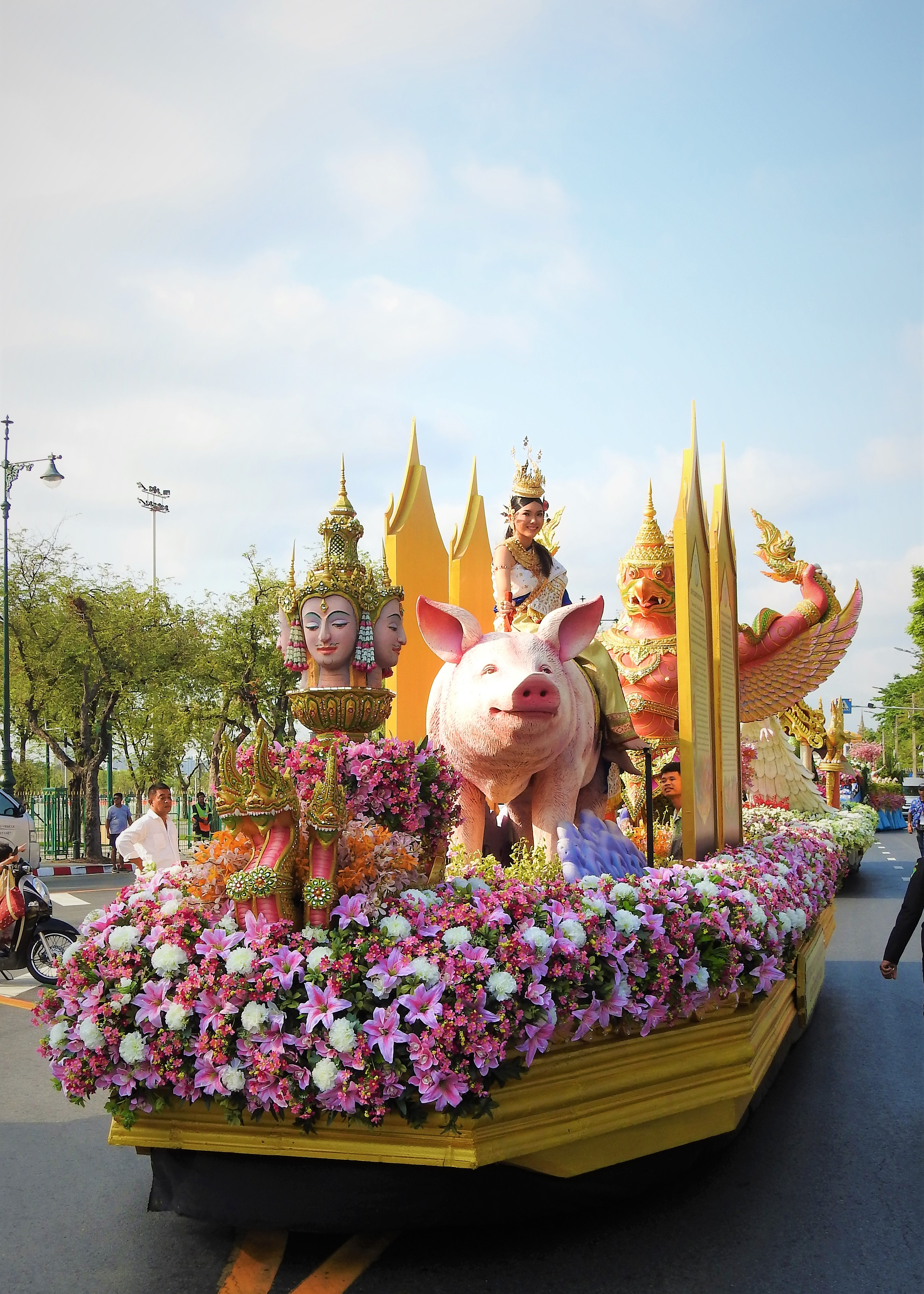
Lady Songkran parade at Songkran festival, Bangkok

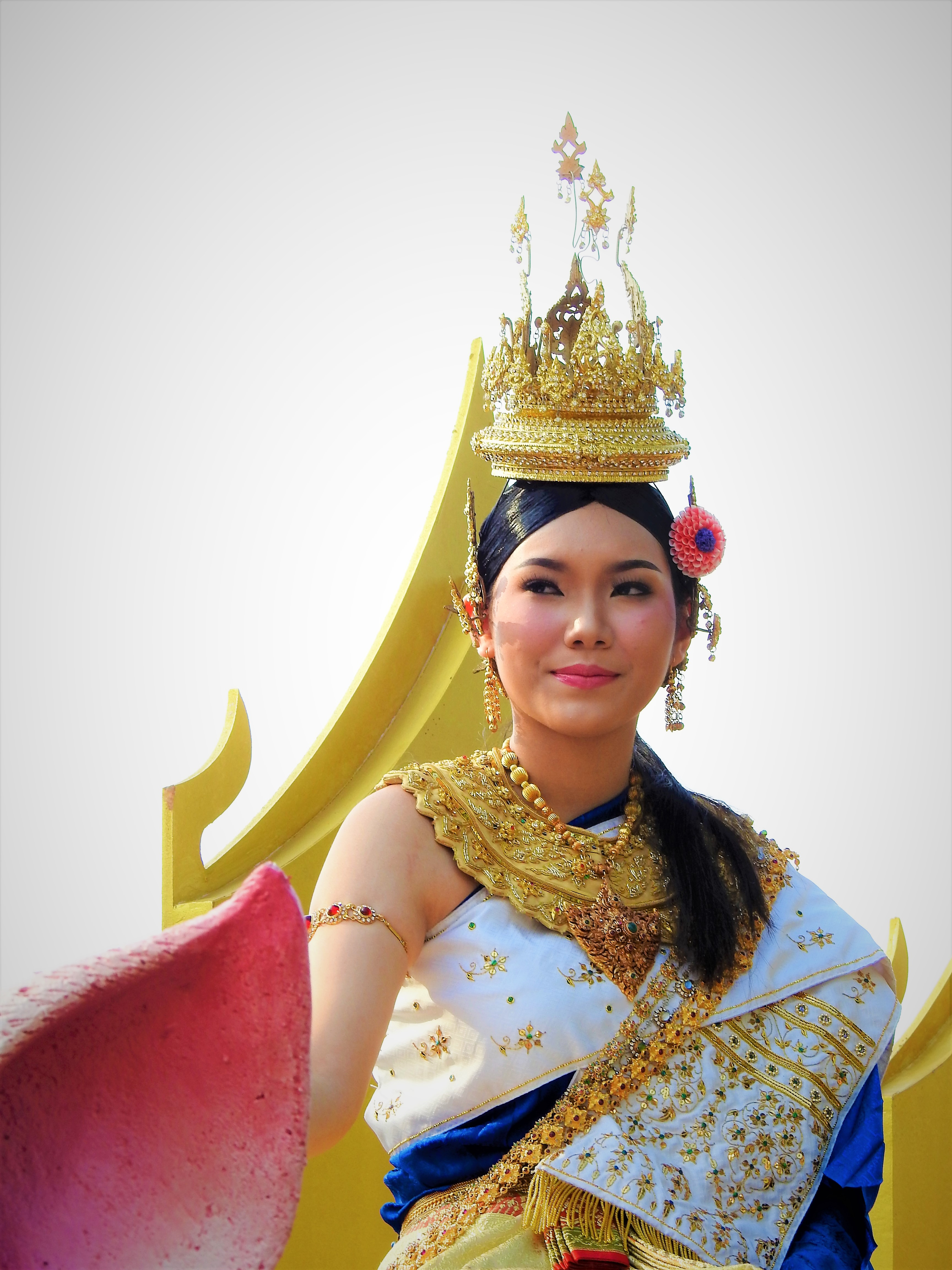
Lady Songkran parade at Songkran festival, Bangkok

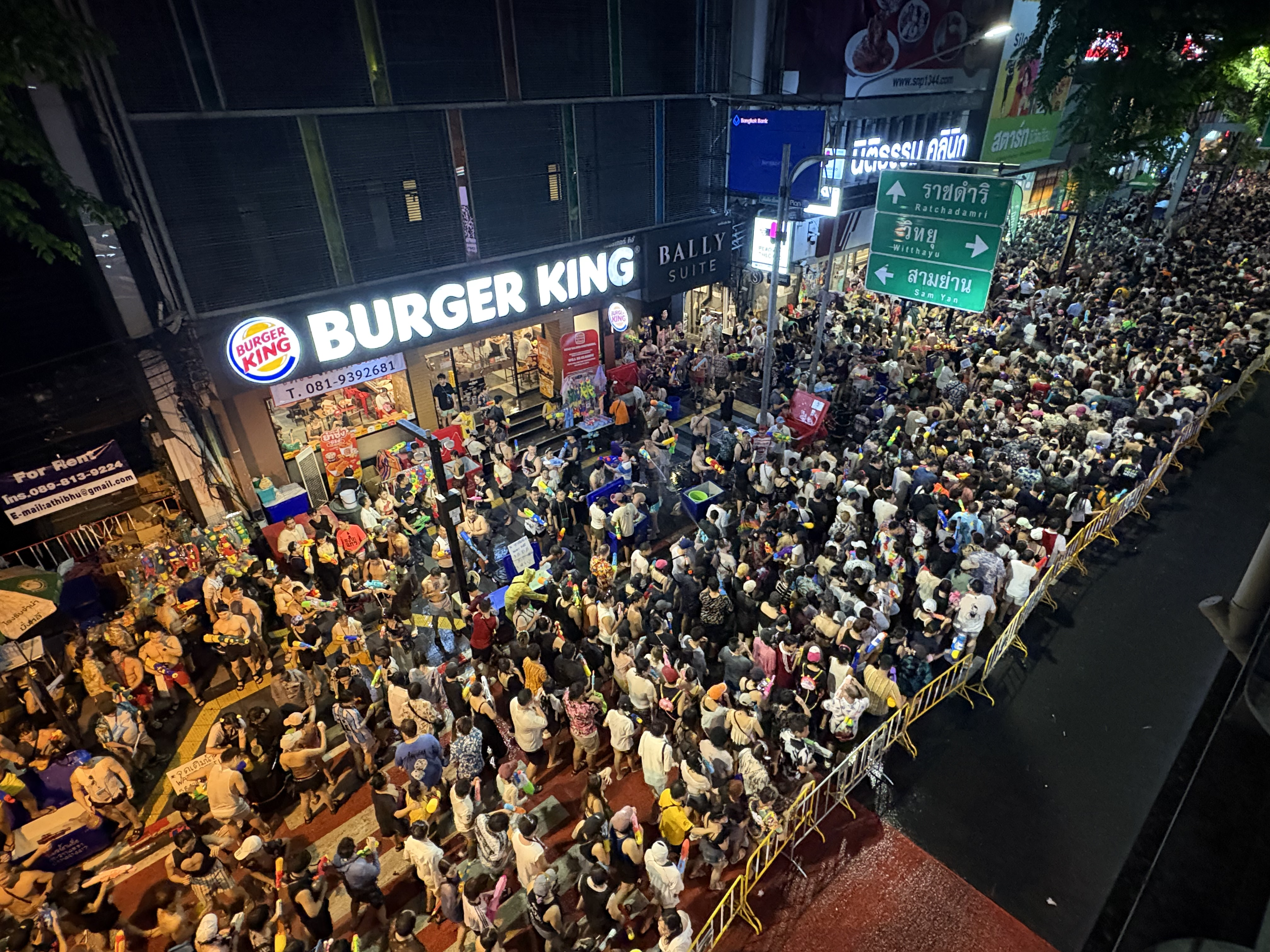
Si Lom Road closure for water fight during Songkran in 2025

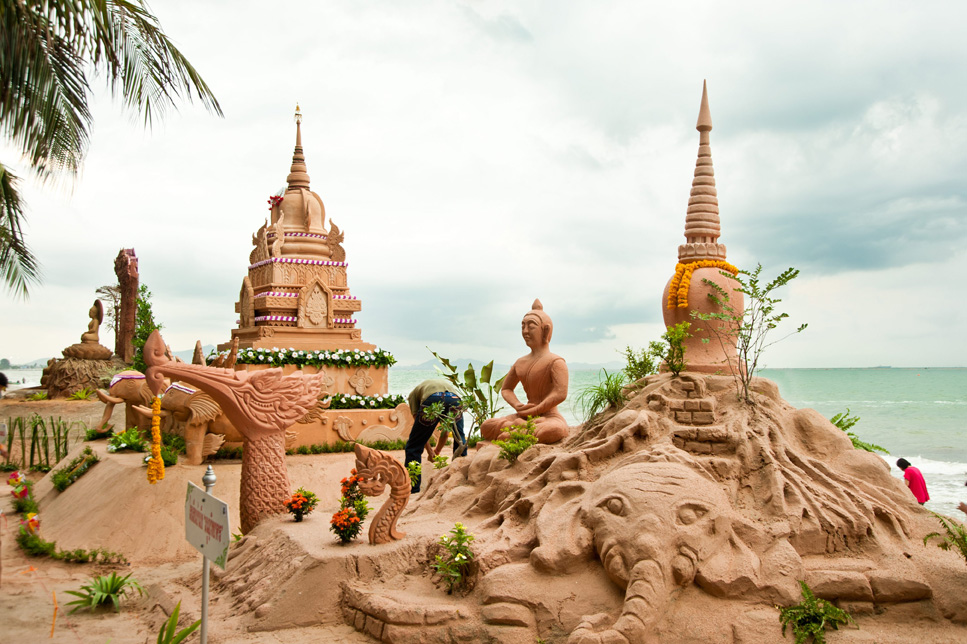
Sand stupas at Bang Saen during Wan Lai 2018. Creating sand sculptures, such as stupas and Buddha images, is a traditional activity that forms part of Wan Lai, the eastern-style Songkran celebration

=== Elsewhere ===
Songkran is celebrated by the Malaysian Siamese community, particularly in the states of Kedah, Kelantan, Penang, Perak, Perlis and Terengganu where most Siamese are located.

In Japan, Songkran festival observance held along with the Hot Spring festival, Beppu Hatto Onsen Matsuri, in Beppu city, Ōita Prefecture, called Beppu Songkran Festival, not only water-splashing observance but also Thai cultural fanfares occurred, and also held at the world's wettest music festival, S2O Japan Songkran Music Festival.

Songkran is celebrated annually on the U.S. territory of Wake Island by Air Force members and American and Thai contractors, including New York State for commemorating the Asian American community's celebration of Songkran on April as an important cultural event on the state according to Assembly Resolution No. 1059.

== Controversies ==
=== Roadway fatalities ===
Police statistics show that the death toll from road accidents doubles during the annual Songkran holiday. Between 2009 and 2013 there were about 27 road deaths per day during non-holiday periods and an average of 52 road deaths per day during Songkran. Thailand has among the highest traffic fatality rates in the world, along with Liberia, Congo, and Tanzania. Approximately 70–80 percent of the accidents that occur during the long holiday period are motorcycle accidents. About 10,000 people per year die in motorcycle accidents.

The National Council for Peace and Order (NCPO) says a total of 110,909 people were arrested and 5,772 vehicles impounded at road safety checkpoints across the country between 9–16 April 2016. In 2018 the number of offenders arrested at 2,029 checkpoints had risen to 146,589. Of these, 39,572 had failed to wear crash helmets and 37,779 carried no driving licence. Reacting to the numbers, the prime minister "ordered stricter enforcement of the law"; the interior minister said he would "propose greater efforts in raising awareness as an additional measure, insisting that traffic laws were [already] strictly enforced"; and deputy prime minister Prawit Wongsuwan said he would "work harder to ensure motorcyclists wore helmets".

This period is known locally as "7 dangerous days".

Date	Accidents	Deaths	Injuries	Source
11–17 Apr 2018	3,724	418	3,987	
2017	3,690	335	3,506	
11–17 Apr 2016	3,447	442	3,656	
2015	3,373	364	3,559	
11–17 Apr 2014	2,992	322	3,225	

=== Intellectual property ===
==== Celebrate Singapore ====
In 2014, "Celebrate Singapore," a large two-day Songkran-style water festival, was planned for Singapore and the event was promoted as the "largest water festival party in Singapore." However, controversy emerged when the Tourism Authority of Thailand (TAT) Deputy Governor for Tourism Products, Vilaiwan Twichasri, claimed that Thailand holds exclusive rights to celebrate Songkran and planned to consult with officials at the Department of Intellectual Property, Ministry of Commerce and Ministry of Culture to discuss a potential lawsuit. The Deputy Governor's view was supported by numerous Thai citizens on social media websites. Chai Nakhonchai, Cultural Promotion Department chief, pointed out that Songkran is a traditional festival shared by many countries throughout Southeast Asia, while historian Charnvit Kasetsiri stated that no single nation can claim ownership of a tradition. On 25 March 2014, the Bangkok Post reported that the Singaporean government had intervened in the festival's content and there would be no water-throwing, no water pistols and no public drinking. The festival was also reduced to a one-day event.

== See also ==
- Choul Chnam Thmey – the Cambodian New Year that follows the same date and time.
- Holi — an Indian holiday famous for its ritualized street celebrations with colored powder. For similar festivals in India, see: Vishu, Puthandu, Baisakhi, and Pohela Boishakh.
- Water Festival — Vibrant celebrations that occur across the globe, often marking the start of a new year or season. Countries/Regions include: Thailand, Laos, Myanmar, Cambodia, Xishuangbanna and Dehong regions of China.
- List of Intangible Cultural Heritage elements in Thailand
- Nusardil — An Assyrian festival that also involves water splashing.
