= Ban Sai Thong railway halt =

Railway halt in Thailand

Coordinates: 11.0309°N 99.4152°E

Ban Sai Thong บ้านทรายทอง

General information
- Location: Mu 4 (Ban Sai Thong), Sai Thong Subdistrict, Bang Saphan Noi District, Prachuap Khiri Khan
- Owner: State Railway of Thailand
- Line: Southern Line
- Platforms: 1
- Tracks: 1

Other information
- Station code: ซท.

Services
Preceding station	State Railway of Thailand	Following station
Huai Sak towards Hua Lamphong or Krung Thep Aphiwat	Southern Line	Khao Chai Rat towards Su-ngai Kolok
Location

Ban Sai Thong Halt (Thai: ที่หยุดรถบ้านทรายทอง) is a railway halt located in Sai Thong Subdistrict, Bang Saphan Noi District, Prachuap Khiri Khan. It is located 404.3 km (251.2 mi) from Thon Buri Railway Station

== Train services ==
- Ordinary 254/255 Lang Suan-Thon Buri-Lang Suan
