= Map Ammarit railway station =

Railway station in Chumphon, Thailand

Coordinates: 10.8693°N 99.3425°E

Map Ammarit มาบอำมฤต
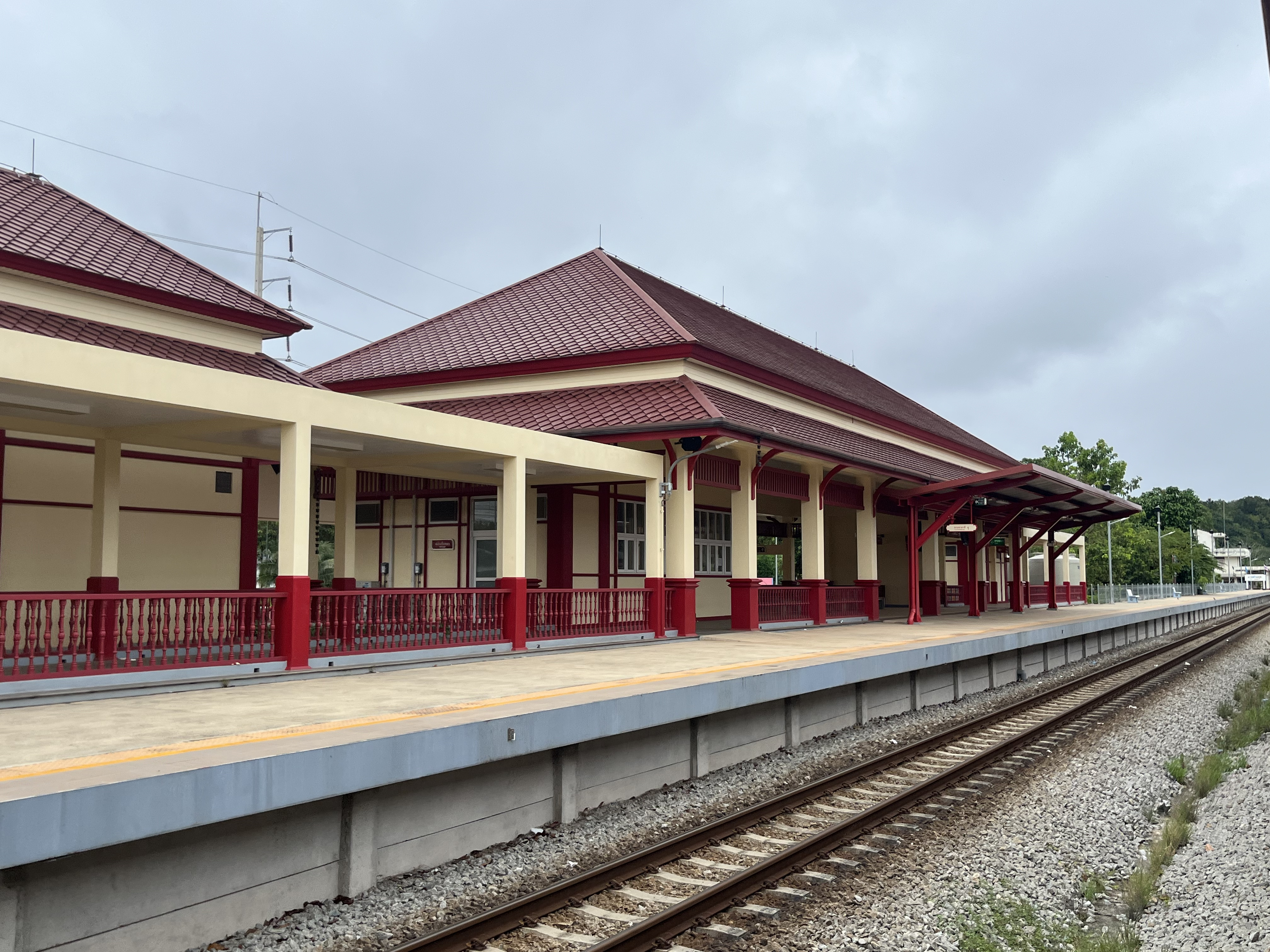
- Station in 2025

General information
- Location: National Highway No. 3253, Mu 12 (Ban Map Ammarit), Don Sai Subdistrict, Pathio District, Chumphon
- Owner: State Railway of Thailand
- Platforms: 2
- Tracks: 3

Other information
- Station code: มร.

History
- Former names: Map Rit

Services
Preceding station	State Railway of Thailand	Following station
Khao Chai Rat towards Hua Lamphong or Krung Thep Aphiwat	Southern Line	Ban Sap Somboon Halt towards Su-ngai Kolok
Location

Map Ammarit railway station is a railway station located in Don Sai Subdistrict, Pathio District, Chumphon, Thailand. It is a class 2 railway station, located 420.597 km (261.3 mi) from Thon Buri railway station.

== Train services ==
- Special Express No. 43/44 Bangkok-Surat Thani-Bangkok
- Special Express No. 39/40 Bangkok-Surat Thani-Bangkok
- Special Express No. 41/42 Bangkok-Yala-Bangkok
- Express No. 86 Nakhon Si Thammarat-Bangkok
- Rapid No. 169/170 Bangkok-Yala-Bangkok
- Rapid No. 173/174 Bangkok-Nakhon Si Thammarat-Bangkok
- Ordinary No. 254/255 Lang Suan-Thon Buri-Lang Suan

== Gallery ==
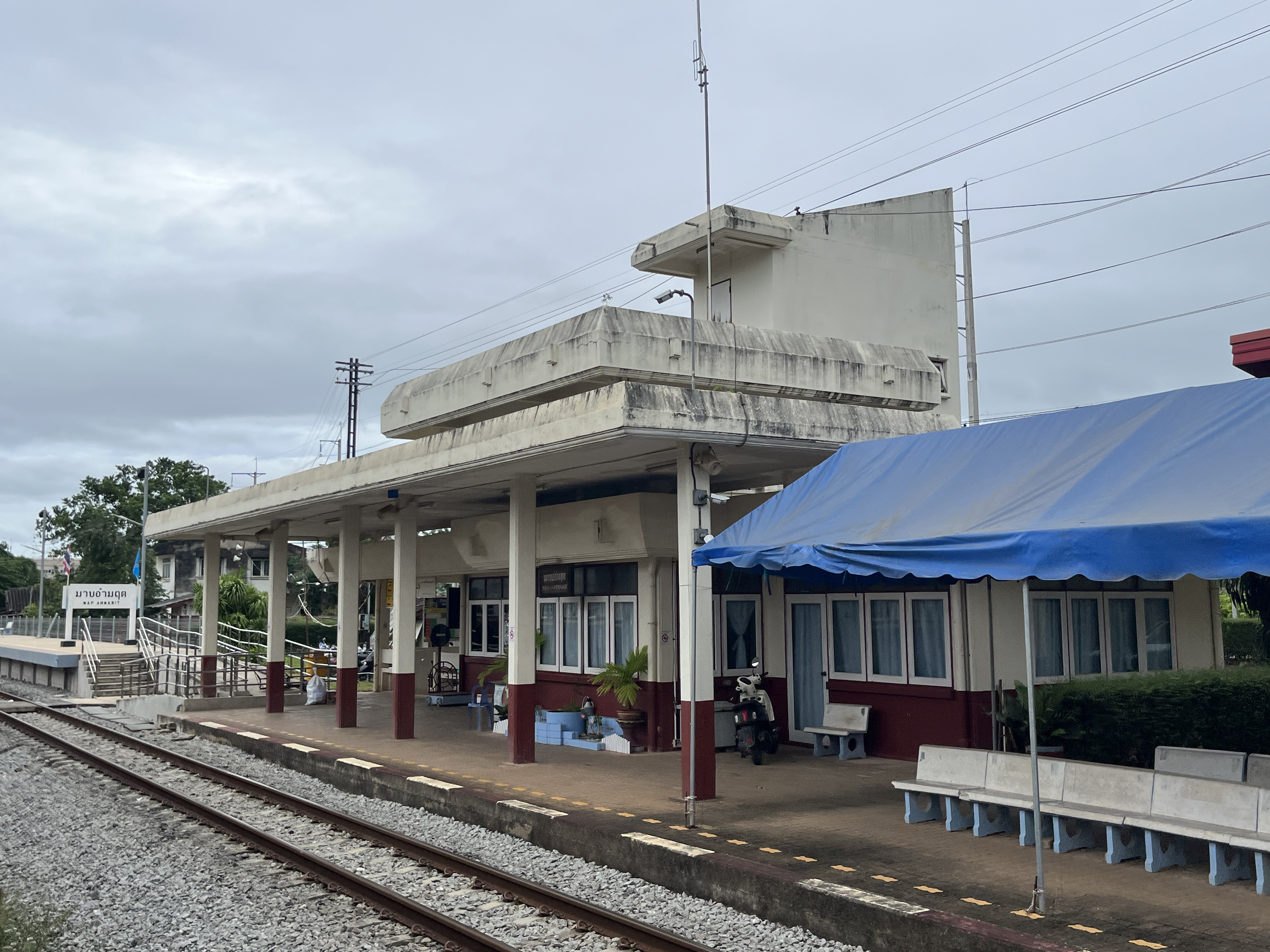
Former station building
