= Khlong Wang Chang railway station =

Railway station in Thailand

Coordinates: 10.7524°N 99.3349°E

Khlong Wang Chang คลองวังช้าง
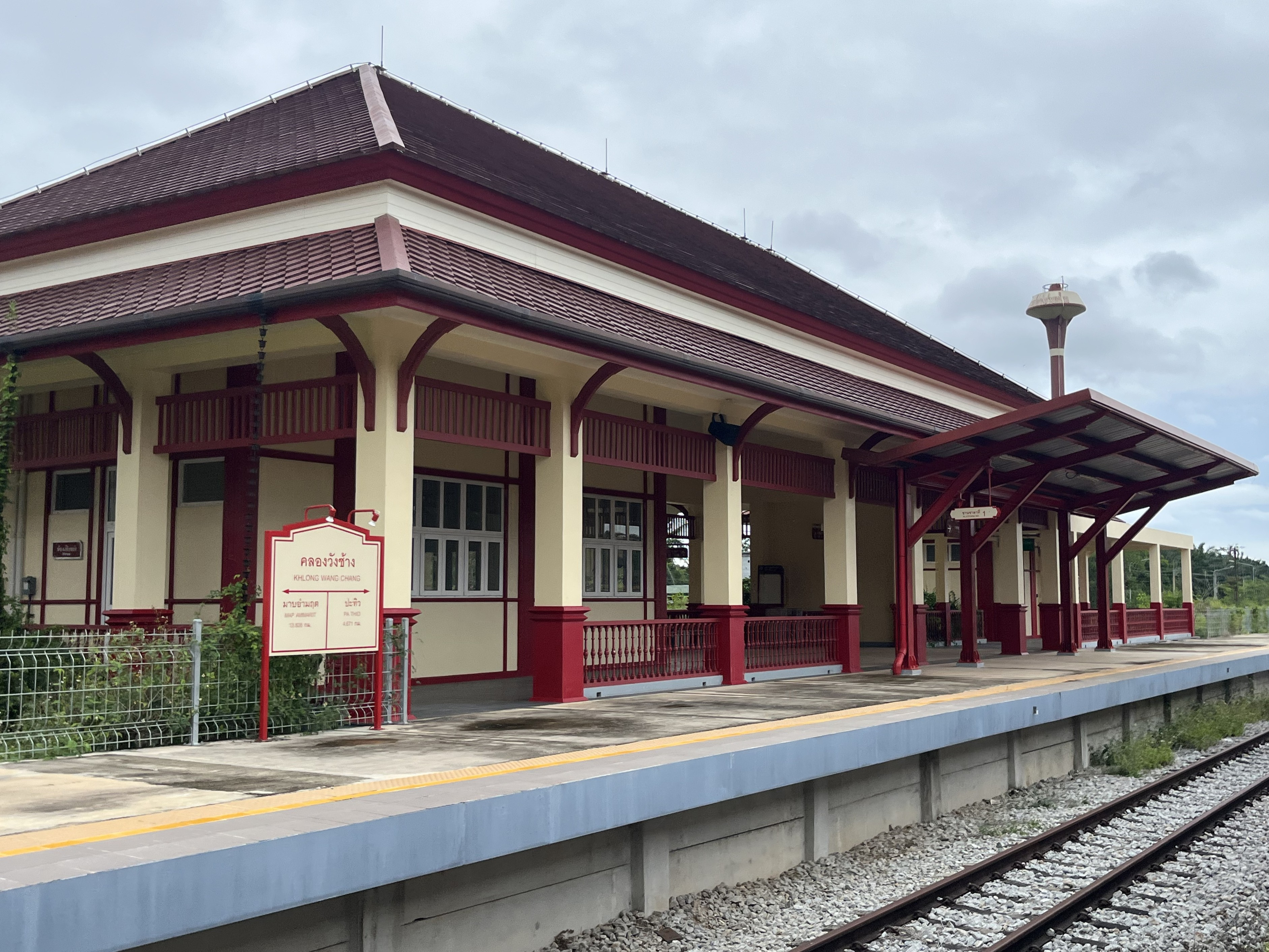
- Station in 2025

General information
- Location: National Highway No. 3253, Mu 4 (Ban Khlong Wang Chang), Chum Kho Subdistrict, Pathio District, Chumphon
- Owner: State Railway of Thailand
- Line: Southern Line
- Platforms: 1
- Tracks: 2

Other information
- Station code: คช.

Services
Preceding station	State Railway of Thailand	Following station
Ban Sap Somboon Halt towards Hua Lamphong or Krung Thep Aphiwat	Southern Line	Pathio towards Su-ngai Kolok
Location

Khlong Wang Chang railway station is a railway station located in Chum Kho Subdistrict, Pathio District, Chumphon. It is a class 3 railway station located 434.293 km (269.9 mi) from Thon Buri railway station.

== Train services ==
- Ordinary 254/255 Lang Suan-Thon Buri-Lang Suan

== Gallery ==
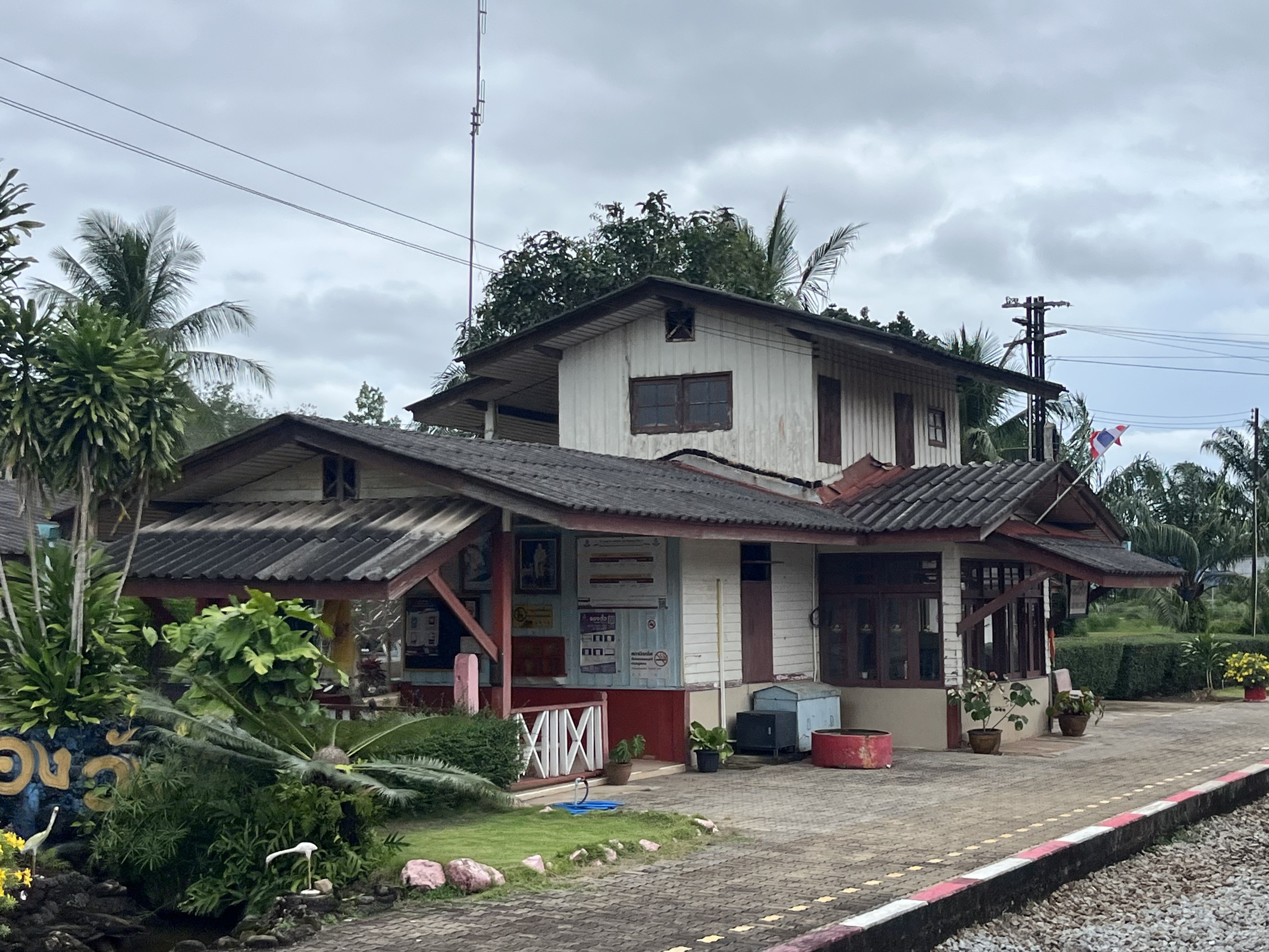
Former station building
