= Ban Sap Somboon railway halt =

Railway halt in Thailand

Coordinates: 10°48′26.3″N 99°20′54.2″E

Ban Sap Somboon บ้านทรัพย์สมบูรณ์
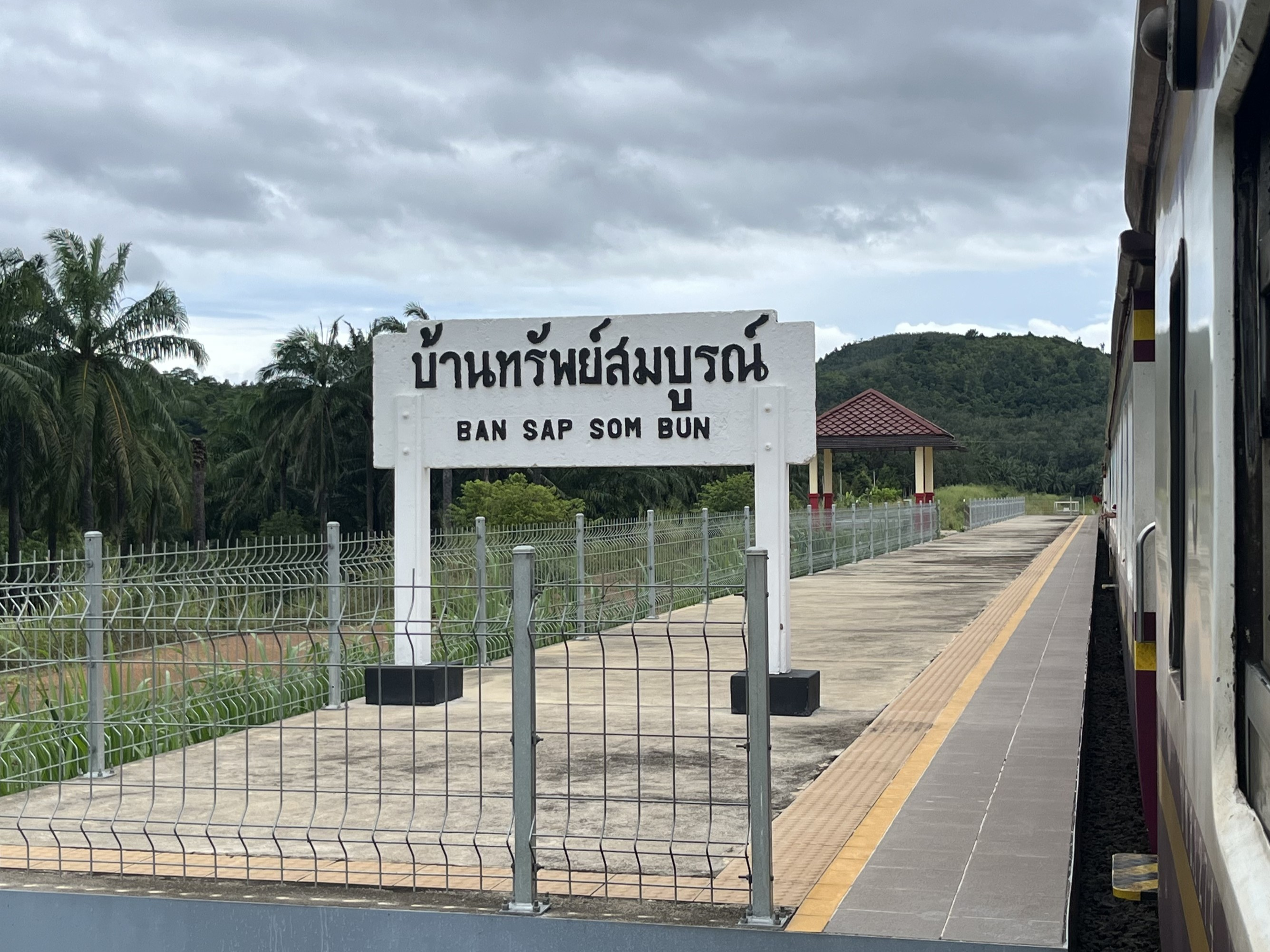
- Railway halt in 2025

General information
- Location: Mu 7 (Ban Sap Somboon), Chum Kho Subdistrict, Pathio District, Chumphon
- Owner: State Railway of Thailand
- Line: Southern Line
- Platforms: 1
- Tracks: 1

Other information
- Station code: ซส.

Services
| Preceding station | State Railway of Thailand | Following station |
|---|---|---|
| Map Ammarit towards Hua Lamphong or Krung Thep Aphiwat | Southern Line | Khlong Wang Chang towards Su-ngai Kolok |
Location

Ban Sap Somboon Halt (Thai: ที่หยุดรถบ้านทรัพย์สมบูรณ์, RTGS: Thi Yut Rot Ban Sap Sombun) is a railway halt located in Chum Kho Subdistrict, Pathio District, Chumphon. It is located 427.666 km (265.7 mi) from Thon Buri Railway Station.

== Train services ==
- Ordinary 254/255 Lang Suan-Thon Buri-Lang Suan

== Gallery ==
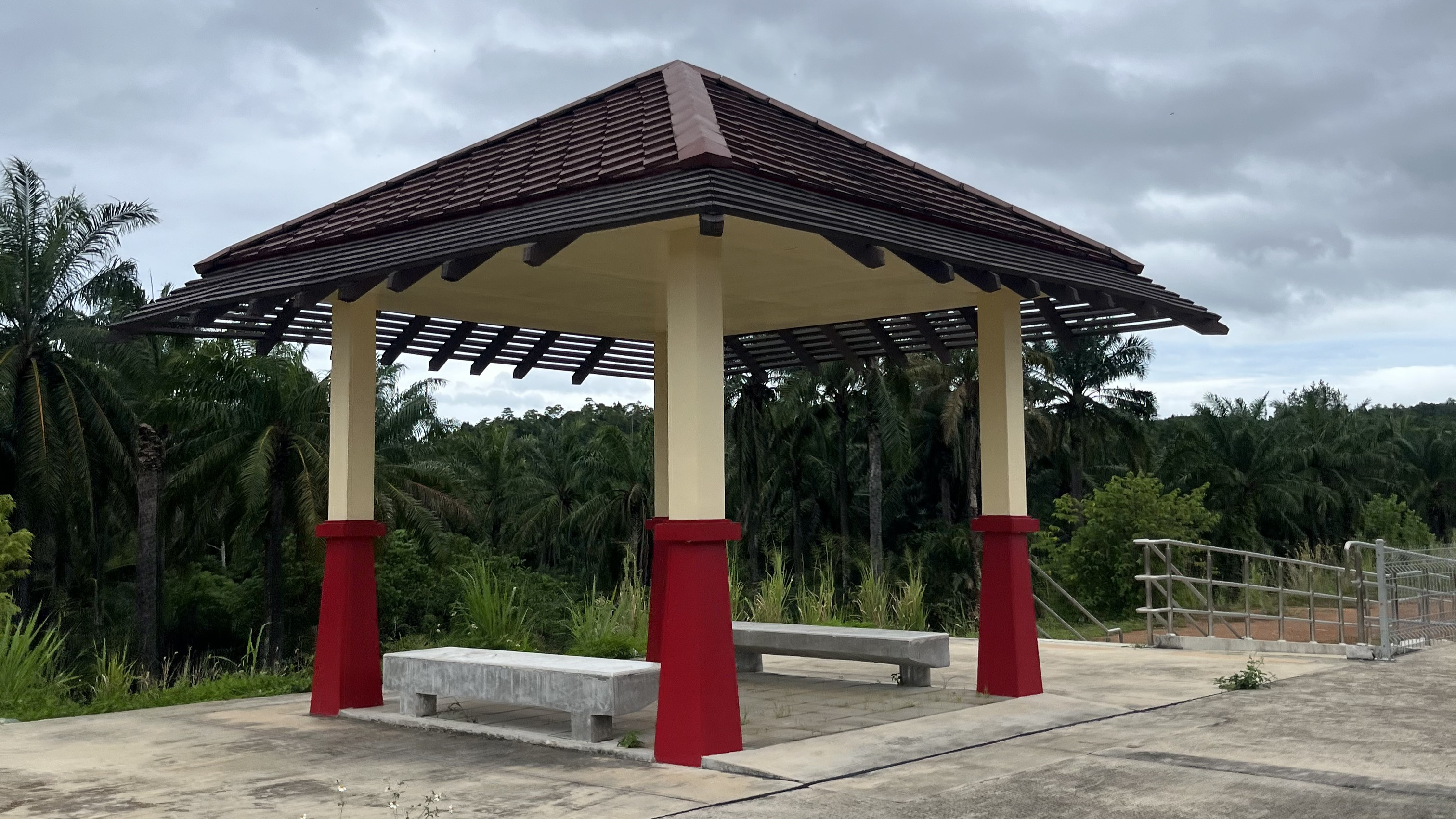
New halt shelter

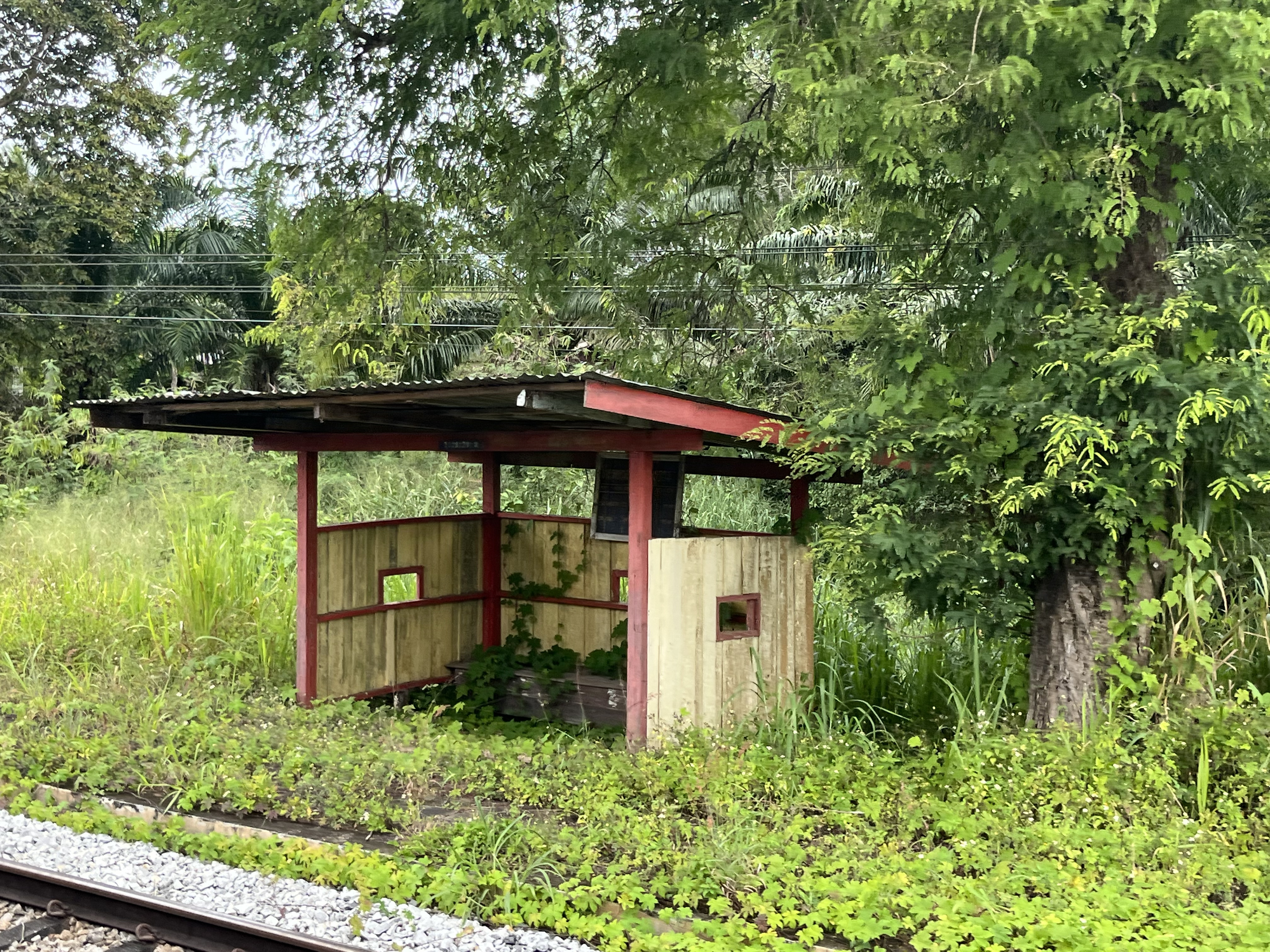
Former halt shelter
