= Khao Chai Rat railway station =

Railway station in Thailand

Coordinates: 10.9577°N 99.3640°E

Khao Chai Rat เขาไชยราช
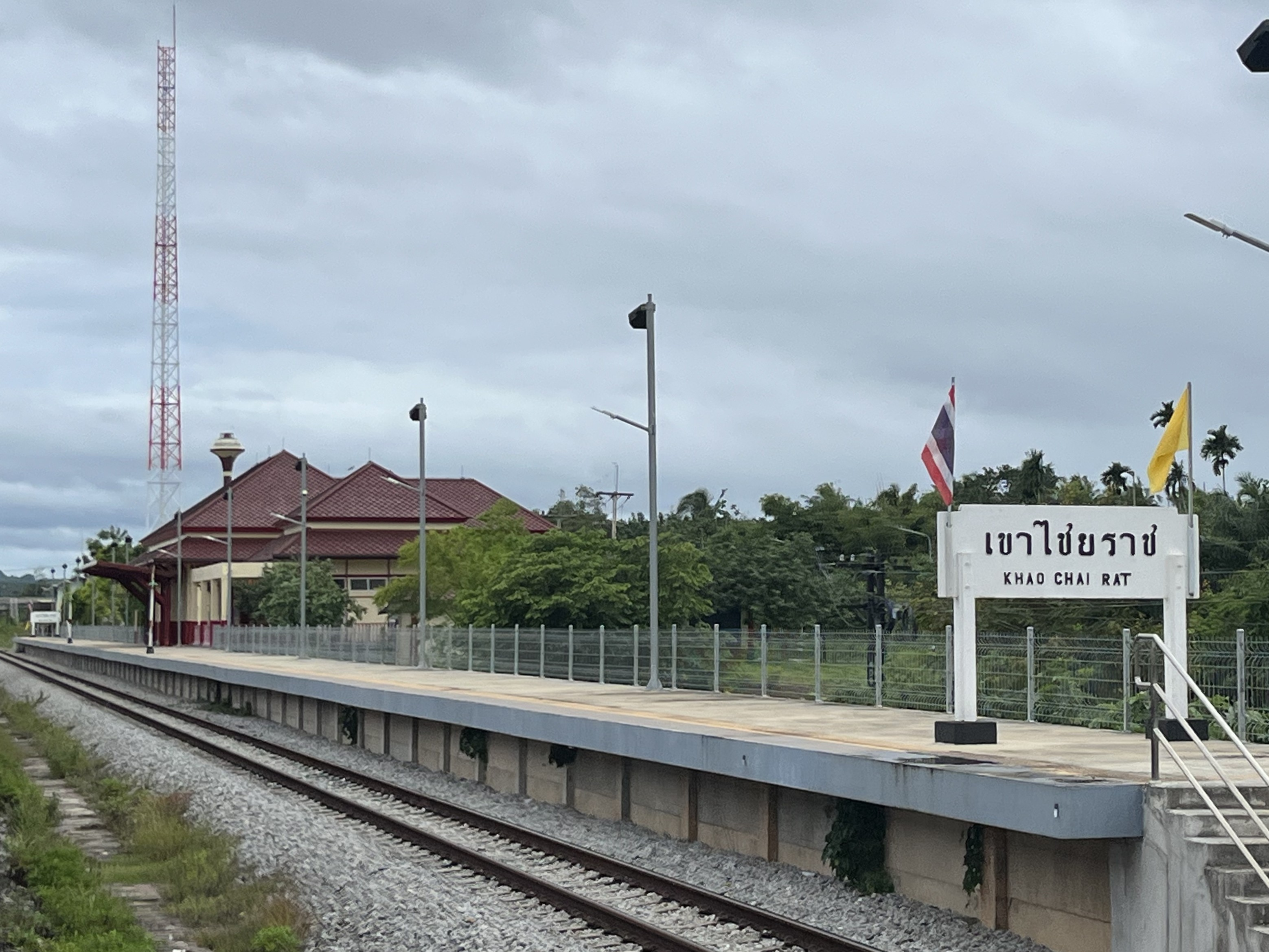
- Station in 2025

General information
- Location: Mu 4 (Ban Khao Chai Rat), Khao Chai Rat Subdistrict, Pathio District, Chumphon
- Owner: State Railway of Thailand
- Line: Southern Line
- Platforms: 1
- Tracks: 2

Other information
- Station code: ขช.

Services
Preceding station	State Railway of Thailand	Following station
Ban Sai Thong Halt towards Hua Lamphong or Krung Thep Aphiwat	Southern Line	Map Ammarit towards Su-ngai Kolok
Location

Khao Chai Rat railway station is a railway station located in Khao Chai Rat Subdistrict, Pathio District, Chumphon. It is a class 3 railway station located 409.656 km (254.5 mi) from Thon Buri railway station.

== Train services ==
- Ordinary 254/255 Lang Suan-Thon Buri-Lang Suan

== Gallery ==
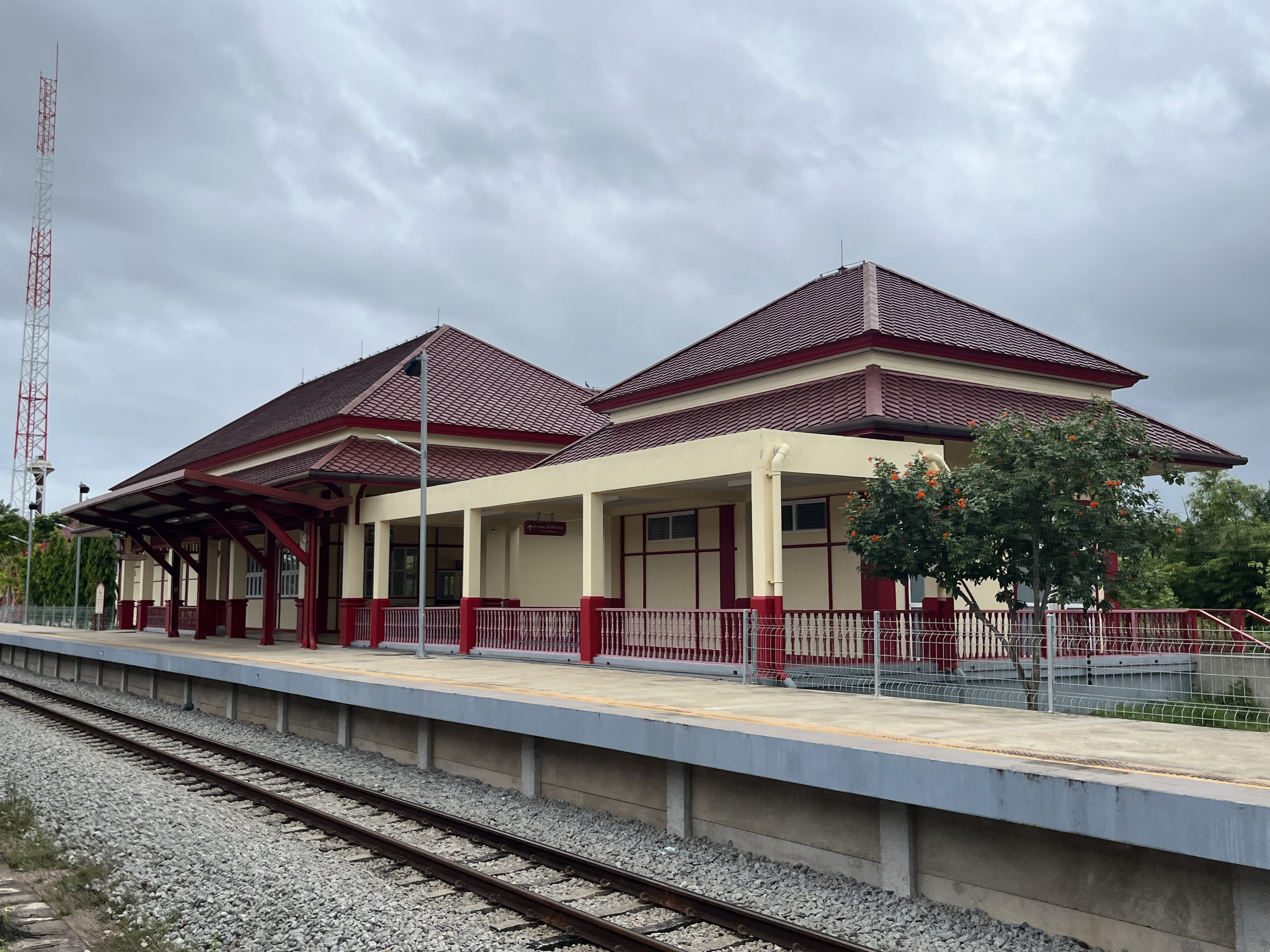
New station building

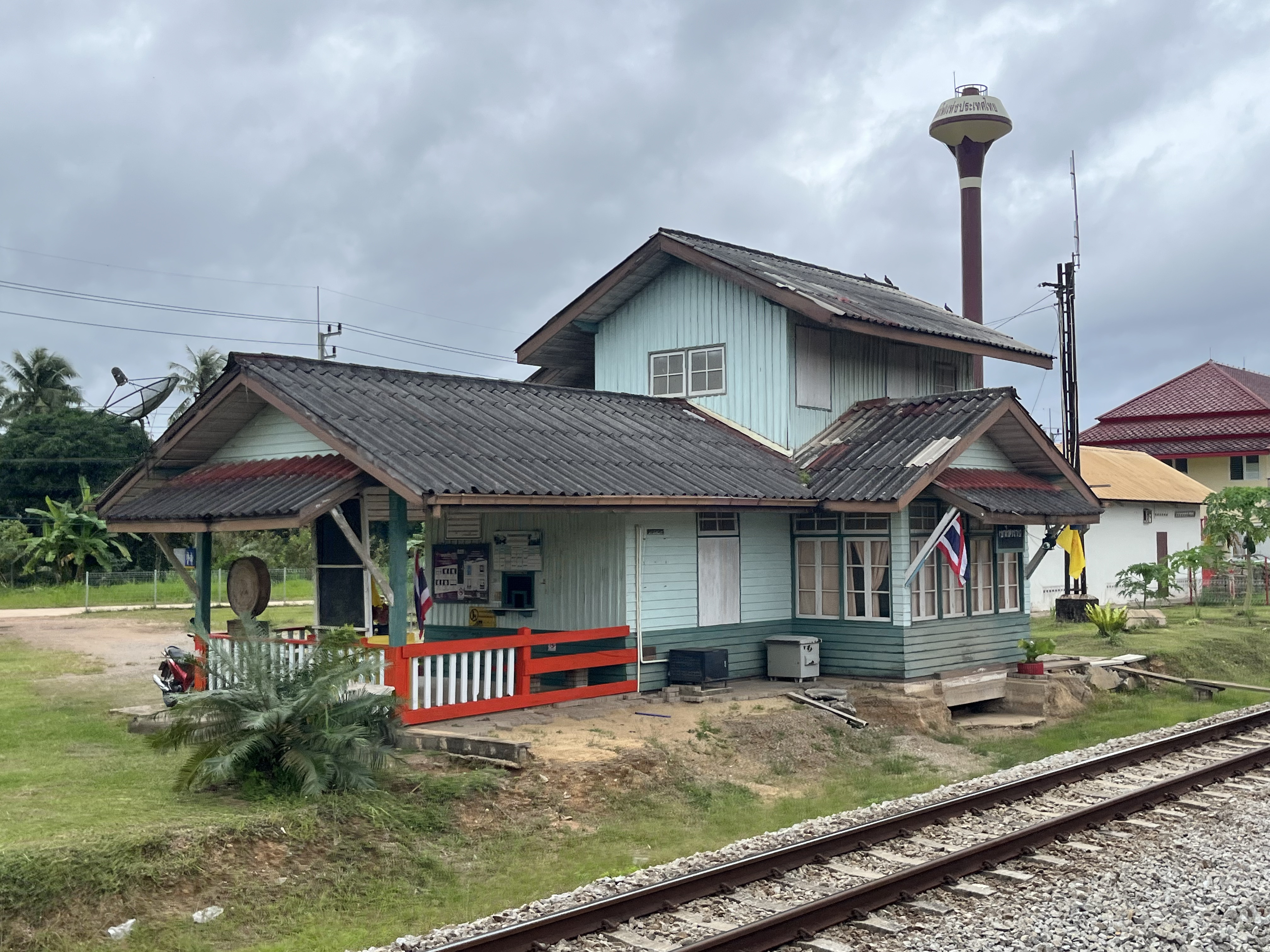
Former station building
