= Huai Sak railway station =

Railway station in Thailand

Coordinates: 11.0309°N 99.4152°E

Huai Sak ห้วยสัก

General information
- Location: Prachuap Khiri Khan Local Road No. 1015, Mu 7 (Ban Huai Sak), Sai Thong Subdistrict, Bang Saphan Noi District, Prachuap Khiri Khan
- Owner: State Railway of Thailand
- Line: Southern Line
- Platforms: 1
- Tracks: 3

Other information
- Station code: ยส.

Services
Preceding station	State Railway of Thailand	Following station
Bang Saphan Noi towards Hua Lamphong or Krung Thep Aphiwat	Southern Line	Ban Sai Thong Halt towards Su-ngai Kolok
Location

Huai Sak railway station is a railway station located in Sai Thong Subdistrict, Bang Saphan Noi District, Prachuap Khiri Khan. It is a class 3 railway station located 399.929 km (248.5 mi) from Thon Buri railway station.

== Train services ==
- Ordinary 254/255 Lang Suan-Thon Buri-Lang Suan
