= Bang Saphan Noi railway station =

Railway station in Thailand

Coordinates: 11.0858°N 99.4499°E

Bang Saphan Noi บางสะพานน้อย

General information
- Location: National Highway No. 3497, Mu 4 (Ban Bang Saphan Noi), Bang Saphan Subdistrict, Bang Saphan Noi District, Prachuap Khiri Khan
- Owner: State Railway of Thailand
- Platforms: 1
- Tracks: 2

Other information
- Station code: พน.

Services
Preceding station	State Railway of Thailand	Following station
Cha Muang towards Hua Lamphong or Krung Thep Aphiwat	Southern Line	Huai Sak towards Su-ngai Kolok
Location

Bang Saphan Noi station (Thai: สถานีบางสะพานน้อย) is a railway station in Bang Saphan Subdistrict, Bang Saphan Noi District, Prachuap Khiri Khan. It is a class 2 railway station, 393 km (244.2 mi) from Thon Buri Railway Station.

== Train services ==
- Rapid No. 167/168 Bangkok-Kantang-Bangkok
- Rapid No. 173/174 Bangkok-Nakhon Si Thammarat-Bangkok
- Ordinary No. 254/255 Lang Suan-Thon Buri-Lang Suan
- Special Express No. 40 Surat Thani-Krung Thep Aphiwat (trial between January 1 and March 31, 2024 for 3 months)
- Special Express No. 43 Krung Thep Aphiwat-Surat Thani (trial between January 1 and March 31, 2024 for 3 months)
