= Bang Saphan Noi district =

Bang Saphan Noi บางสะพานน้อย
- District
- District location in Prachuap Khiri Khan province
- Coordinates: 11°4′30″N 99°26′30″E
- Country: Thailand
- Province: Prachuap Khiri Khan
- Seat: Bang Saphan

Area
  - Total: 720.0 km^{2} (278.0 sq mi)

Population (January 2025)
  - Total: 39,640
  - Density: 55.06/km^{2} (142.6/sq mi)
- Time zone: UTC+7 (ICT)
- Postal code: 77170
- Geocode: 7705

Bang Saphan Noi (Thai: บางสะพานน้อย, pronounced [bāːŋ sā.pʰāːn nɔ́ːj]) is the southernmost district (amphoe) of Prachuap Khiri Khan province, central Thailand.

== History ==
The minor district (king amphoe) Bang Saphan Noi was split off from Bang Saphan district on 10 June 1974. It was upgraded to a full district on 13 July 1981.

== Etymology ==
The name Bang Saphan Noi originates from the time of the building of the southern railway. The workers had to build two bridges north and south of the railway station which later became the center of the district. As this was the same structure as for the Bang Saphan railway station further north, they thus named the railway station Bang Saphan Noi ('small bridge village'), and subsequently the railway station of Bang Saphan was named Bang Saphan Yai ('big bridge village').

== Geography ==
Neighboring districts are Bang Saphan to the north, to the south the districts Tha Sae and Pathio of Chumphon province. To the west is the Tanintharyi Division of Myanmar, to the east, the Gulf of Thailand.

== Environment ==
From 2002 to 2020, the district has lost 3,000 hectares of humid primary forest, a decrease of 16 percent.

== Administration ==
The district is divided into five subdistricts (tambons), which are further subdivided into 41 villages (mubans). Bang Saphan Noi is also the only township (thesaban tambon) of the district, which covers parts of the tambon Bang Saphan. There are a further five tambon administrative organizations (TAO).

No.	Name	Thai	Villages	Pop.
1.	Pak Phraek	ปากแพรก	6	3,669
2.	Bang Saphan	บางสะพาน	10	7,597
3.	Sai Thong	ทรายทอง	11	7,506
4.	Chang Raek	ช้างแรก	8	10,832
5.	Chaiyarat	ไชยราช	6	10,036
