= Pathio district =

Pathio ปะทิว
- District
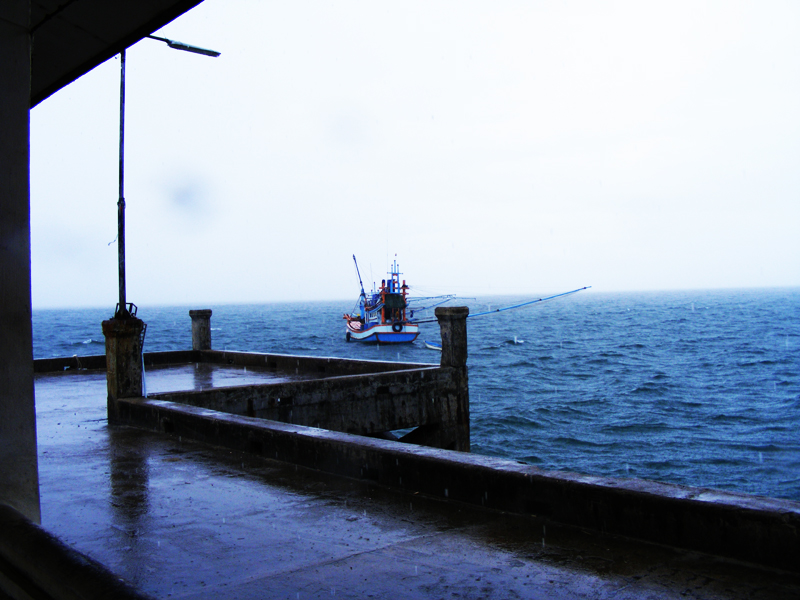
- Fishing boat and pier, Saphli, Pathio

- District location in Chumphon province
- Coordinates: 10°42′33″N 99°19′6″E
- Country: Thailand
- Province: Chumphon
- Seat: Bang Son

Area
  - Total: 596.0 km^{2} (230.1 sq mi)

Population (2005)
  - Total: 44,393
  - Density: 74.5/km^{2} (193/sq mi)
- Time zone: UTC+7 (ICT)
- Postal code: 86160
- Geocode: 8603

Pathio (Thai: ปะทิว, pronounced [pā.tʰīw]) is a district (amphoe) in the northern part of Chumphon province, southern Thailand. The province's main airport, Chumphon Airport is in Pathio. Pathio has alternate English spellings, Pathiu and Pathiew.

== Geography ==
Neighboring districts are (from the south clockwise) Mueang Chumphon, Tha Sae of Chumphon Province, and Bang Saphan Noi of Prachuap Khiri Khan province. To the east is the Gulf of Thailand. The area features numerous limestone caves and rock formations from the Mesozoic Era. The main beach of Pathio is named Ao Bo Mao, translated as 'Spring Tree Bay', Wikimapia.

== Administration ==
The district is divided into seven sub-districts (tambons), which are further subdivided into 70 villages (mubans). There are three townships (thesaban tambon): Pathio covers parts of tambons Bang Son and Thale Sap, Map Ammarit parts of tambon Don Yang, Sa Phli parts of the same-named tambon. There are a further seven tambon administrative organizations (TAO).

No.	Name	Thai name	Villages	Pop.
1.	Bang Son	บางสน	8	4,184
2.	Thale Sap	ทะเลทรัพย์	7	5,098
3.	Saphli	สะพลี	10	7,669
4.	Chum Kho	ชุมโค	14	9,547
5.	Don Yang	ดอนยาง	15	9,047
6.	Pak Khlong	ปากคลอง	7	4,321
7.	Khao Chai Rat	เขาไชยราช	9	4,527

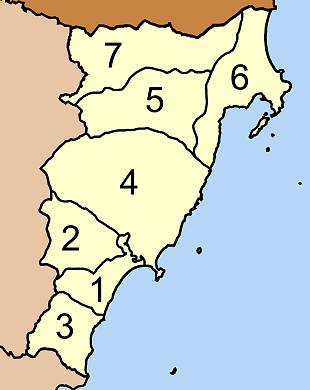
