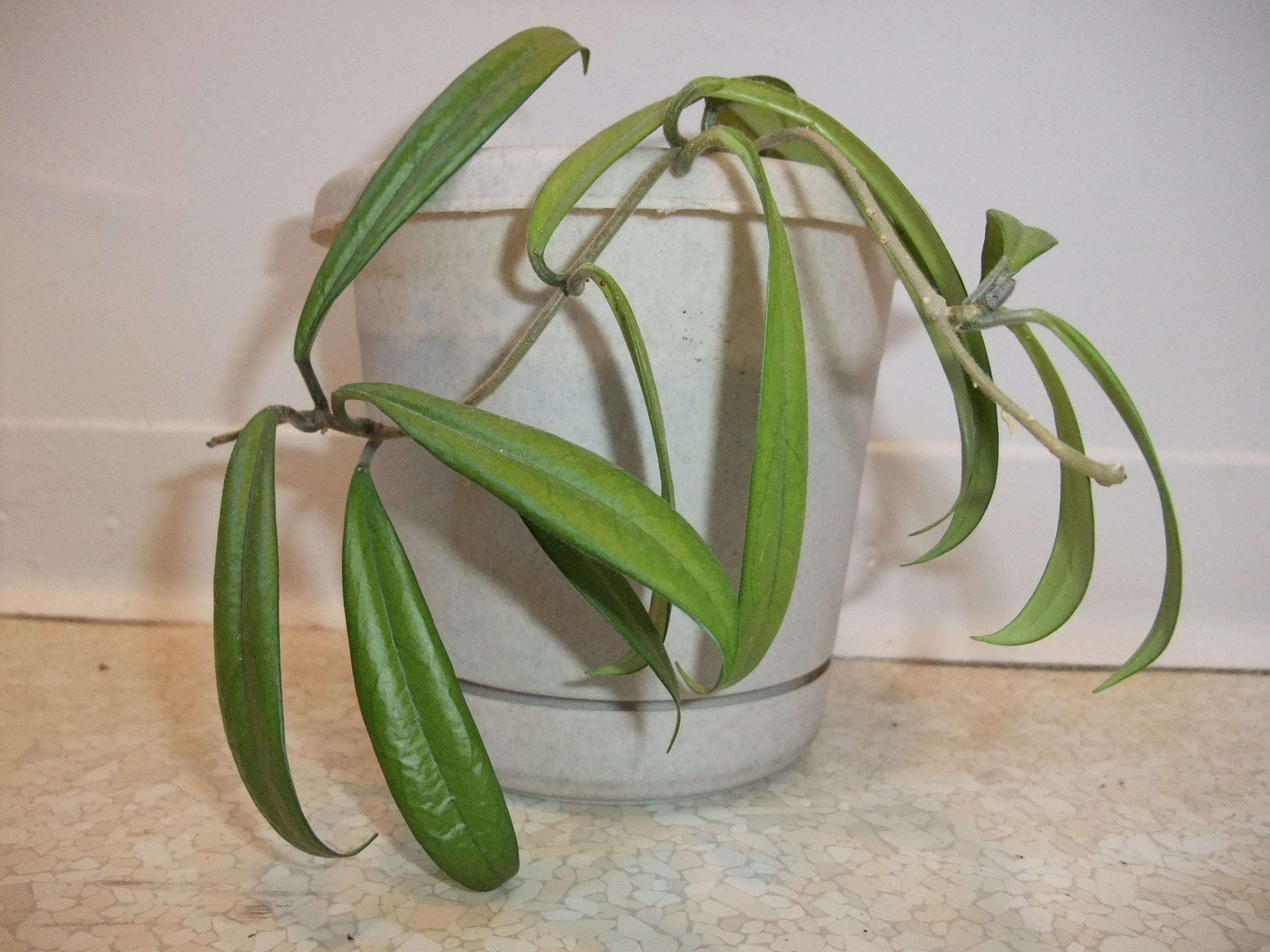

Scientific classification
- Kingdom: Plantae
- Clade: Tracheophytes
- Clade: Angiosperms
- Clade: Eudicots
- Clade: Asterids
- Order: Gentianales
- Family: Apocynaceae
- Genus: Hoya
- Species: H. siamica

Binomial name
- Hoya siamica Craib

= Hoya siamica =

Species of plant

Hoya siamica is a slender vine in the family Apocynaceae and tribe Marsdenieae. It is native to China and Indochina and has characteristic long light green leaves.

== Description and discovery ==
The leaves are on average 15–20 mm wide by 40–100 mm long. It has white flowers that come in clusters of 10 to 15. The corolla of the flowers are white and flat; the corona can be a deep purple or a very pale yellow depending on how much light the plant receives. The flowers are approximately 15 mm in diameter, fuzzy, have a slight scent, and last about a week when they flower during the summer.

Hoya siamica was first found by Arthur Francis George Kerr and published by William Grant Craib in 1911 in the Kew Bulletin. Kerr discovered the plant in mountain jungle on Doi Suthep, near the city of Chiang Mai, at an altitude of around 1500–1650 meters above sea level. The plant derives its name from Siam, the former name of Thailand. It was later also discovered in Gaoligongshan, Yunnan Province and elsewhere in Indochina. Hoya siamica is related to Hoya longifolia.
