= Prismatomeris filamentosa =

Conservation status
- Least Concern (IUCN 3.1)

Scientific classification
- Kingdom: Plantae
- Clade: Tracheophytes
- Clade: Angiosperms
- Clade: Eudicots
- Clade: Asterids
- Order: Gentianales
- Family: Rubiaceae
- Genus: Prismatomeris
- Species: P. filamentosa

Binomial name
- Prismatomeris filamentosa Craib

Species of flowering plant

Prismatomeris filamentosa is a species of flowering plant in the family Rubiaceae. It is a shrub or tree native to south-east Asia. The species was described in 1932, and is listed as of Least Concern by the IUCN.

== Taxonomy ==
The species was described by William Grant Craib in 1932.

== Distribution ==
Prismatomeris filamentosa is native to the wet tropical biome of Cambodia, Laos, Thailand, and Vietnam. The species grows in forests, and its extent of occurrence is around 358,267 square kilometres (138,328 sq mi).

== Description ==
Prismatomeris filamentosa is a shrub or small tree.

== Uses ==
Prismatomeris filamentosa is used in medicine.

== Conservation ==
In 2022, the IUCN assessed Prismatomeris filamentosa as of Least Concern. It is threatened by deforestation and urban development, and has not been found in protected areas.
