= Prismatomeris griffithii =

Conservation status
- Least Concern (IUCN 3.1)

Scientific classification
- Kingdom: Plantae
- Clade: Tracheophytes
- Clade: Angiosperms
- Clade: Eudicots
- Clade: Asterids
- Order: Gentianales
- Family: Rubiaceae
- Genus: Prismatomeris
- Species: P. griffithii

Binomial name
- Prismatomeris griffithii Ridl.

Species of flowering plant

Prismatomeris griffithii is a species of flowering plant in the family Rubiaceae. It is a shrub or tree with elliptical leaves. The species is native to south-east Asia.

Prismatomeris griffithii was described in 1920, and is listed as of Least Concern by the IUCN.

== Taxonomy ==
Prismatomeris griffithii was described by Henry Nicholas Ridley in 1920. It was formerly confused with Prismatomeris albidiflora.

== Distribution ==
Prismatomeris griffithii is native to the wet tropical biome of Peninsular Malaysia, Myanmar, and Thailand. Its extent of occurrence is around 425,629 square kilometres (164,336 sq mi). The species grows in lowland forests, at elevations of 50–500 metres (160–1,640 ft).

== Description ==
Prismatomeris griffithii is a shrub or tree. The branches are slender and pale. The leaves are elliptical, thin, sub-leathery, around 3.5 inches (8.9 cm) long, and around 1.75 inches (4.4 cm) wide. The leaf stem is around 0.1 inches (0.25 cm) long.

The inflorescence is a cyme with three flowers. The inflorescence stem is around 0.05 inches (0.13 cm) long. The calyx is bell or funnel-shaped, around 0.1 inches (0.25 cm) long, and has five teeth. The corolla is a tube around 0.5 inches (1.3 cm) long. The flowers have five stamens.

The unripe fruits are globose.

== Conservation ==
In 2022, the IUCN assessed Prismatomeris griffithii as of Least Concern. The species is threatened by habitat loss and urban development. It is found in protected areas.
