= Quercus coffeicolor =

Conservation status
- Data Deficient (IUCN 3.1)

Scientific classification
- Kingdom: Plantae
- Clade: Embryophytes
- Clade: Tracheophytes
- Clade: Spermatophytes
- Clade: Angiosperms
- Clade: Eudicots
- Clade: Rosids
- Order: Fagales
- Family: Fagaceae
- Genus: Quercus
- Subgenus: Quercus subg. Quercus
- Section: Quercus sect. Lobatae
- Species: Q. coffeicolor

Binomial name
- Quercus coffeicolor Trel.

Synonyms
- Quercus prainiana Trel., nom. illeg.; Quercus aequivenulosa Trel.; Quercus coffeaecolor Trel.

Species of oak tree

Quercus coffeicolor is a species of oak. It is native to Nayarit, Sinaloa, and Jalisco in western Mexico.

Trelease in 1924 simultaneously published three names for what nearly all present-day botanists consider to be one species. Some publications have referred to this taxon as Quercus prainiana but this name turns out to have been used earlier, in 1913, applied to an Asian species now called Quercus helferiana. Hence this name is not available for the Mexican trees. Instead, more recent authors been using one of Trelease's other names, Quercus coffeicolor.

The species is placed in section Lobatae.

== Description ==
Quercus coffeicolor is a tree up to 12 metres (39 feet) tall, with a trunk up to 30 centimetres (12 inches) in diameter. The leaves are elliptical, up to 12 cm long, wavy edges but no teeth or lobes.
