= Aporosa villosa =

Scientific classification
- Kingdom: Plantae
- Clade: Tracheophytes
- Clade: Angiosperms
- Clade: Eudicots
- Clade: Rosids
- Order: Malpighiales
- Family: Phyllanthaceae
- Genus: Aporosa
- Species: A. villosa

Binomial name
- Aporosa villosa (Lindl.) Baill.

Synonyms
- Aporosa sphaerosperma Gagnep.; Lepidostachys villosa Wall.; Scepa villosa Lindl.

Species of shrub from Southeast Asia

Aporosa villosa is a species of shrub or small tree in the family Phyllanthaceae. It is found in Southeast Asia, including the Nicobar, Andaman and Paracel Islands. There are some traditional medicinal uses for plant, particularly around care after childbirth. The shrub is often a pioneer species, tolerant of full sun, but intolerant of frequent fires.

== Description ==
This grows as a shrub, or small tree, up to 15 m (49 ft) tall and 15 cm (5.9 in) in diameter, sometimes deciduous. Black to light-brown bark with vertical cracks or grooves. Densely tomentose young branches. Ovate to elliptic leaves some 8.5–30 x 6–12.5 cm in size, with a slightly cordate to rounded base, small hairy basal glands, (lowly) glandular-crenate to lowly glandular-serrate margin with regular distinct blackish marginal glands. The leaves have an acute to acuminate apex, the sometimes brittle, thickish blade which when dry is corrugate-reticulate on the upper surface while the lower surface is smooth. The upper surface of the leaves dry to a greyish- to greenish-brown, occasionally bluish-green, while the lower surface dries to reddish brown.

Distinguishing traits include: the branchlets often have thick scars of fallen leaves; the leaf shape, margins and base. However Schot warns that only the extreme forms of A. villosa leaves are really distinct, otherwise intermediates occur between this species and Aporosa octandra.

Like other species in the Appendiculatae section of the Aporosa genus, this species has: glands that are basal and adaxial; disc-like glands scattered unevenly within arches of marginal veins throughout the abaxial surface of the leaf/lamina; stigma that are papillate; and the ovary has pubescent septae and column.

== Taxonomy and history ==
A. villosa is in a clade with sisters Aporosa ficifolia, Aporosa octandra, A. planchoniana, and A. tetrapleura, separated from other species within the Appendiculatae section of the Aporosa genus.

The species was described in 1858 by Henri Ernest Baillon (1827–1895), a French botanist, physician, and member of the Légion d'honneur. He published the description in his work Etude Générale du Groupe de Euphorbiacées.

== Distribution ==
The species is native to Mainland Southeast Asia. Countries and regions in which it grows include: Thailand; Cambodia; Vietnam; Laos; Myanmar; and India (Nicobar Islands, Andaman Islands). It grows on the disputed Dong Dao Island in the South China Sea. It has been recorded in error from Zhōngguó/China.

== Habitat and ecology ==
The tree can germinate under full sunlight, and is a pioneer species of early successional stages, it is spread by humans and birds.

Frequent burning (7 or more fires in 10 years) occur in many places in the dry dipterocarp forest of the Huai Kha Khaeng Wildlife Sanctuary (northwestern Thailand). In these frequently burnt areas A. villosa is absent, yet it is common in areas with a less frequent burning regime.

Trees identified in a plot at Salawin Wildlife Sanctuary (Mae Hong Son Province, northwestern Thailand) were Anneslea fragrans, A. villosa, Craibiodendron stellatum, Dillenia sp., Gardenia sootepensis, Gluta usitata, Quercus sp., Shorea obtusa, Tristaniopsis burmanica var. rufescens. and Vaccinium sprengelii. Of these ten species only one did not have bark covered densely with bryophytes or lichen, this was A. villosa, which had consistently naked bark, it was the only tree that was not a host for the orchid Dendrobium scabrilingue.

The tree is one of four dominant species (Scaevola sericea, Messerschmidia argentea, Guettarda speciosa, A. villosa) growing on the sand barriers of Dong Dao Island, South China Sea.

The species has been identified as a host of the leaf-spot/lesion-causing sac-fungus (Mycosphaerellaceae family) Zasmidium aporosae in Laos.

== Vernacular names ==
- เหมือดโลด (Thai language)
- ក្កុង, krong (Khmer language)
- tarm ngong (tarm="tree, shrub or plant", Bunong, Cambodia)
- 毛银柴, mao yin chai (Standard Chinese)

== Uses ==
Villagers living on the plateau of Phnom Kulen National Park, in Svay Leu District, Siem Reap Province, northwestern Cambodia, use parts of the shrub in their traditional medicinal practices. The wood chips and root, either alone or in different mixtures with other species, are made into decoctions to drink as part of post-childbirth care, while a mixture of the 2 plant parts, together with root/woodchips of Prismatomeris tetrandra, and the wood chips of Melastoma sp., Rhodomytrus sp. puach toich, and Rhodomyrtus tomentosa is decocted and drunk to encourage lactation.

The Bunong people of Mondulkiri Province, northeastern Cambodia, use the leaves and bark of the plant to treat a variety of illnesses. The leaves are decocted in water then drunk, applied to the stomach, bathed in or used in a steam-bath, macerated in alcohol and drunk, or made into a decocted mixture with the leaves of Ageratum conyzoides, Blumea balsamifera, Chromolaena odorata and Melicope pteleifolia and used in a steam-bath. In one treatment to strengthen the body after childbirth the leaves and wood of the species are boiled together and then drunk or applied to the body.
