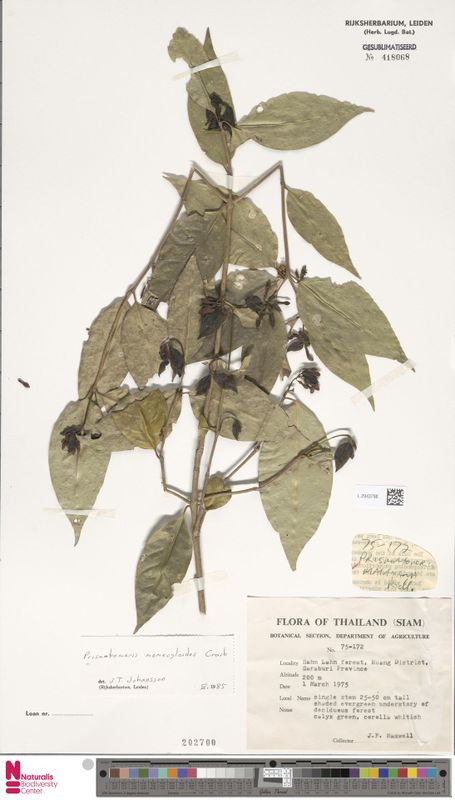

Scientific classification
- Kingdom: Plantae
- Clade: Embryophytes
- Clade: Tracheophytes
- Clade: Spermatophytes
- Clade: Angiosperms
- Clade: Eudicots
- Clade: Asterids
- Order: Gentianales
- Family: Rubiaceae
- Genus: Prismatomeris
- Species: P. memecyloides

Binomial name
- Prismatomeris memecyloides Craib

= Prismatomeris memecyloides =

Species of flowering plant

Prismatomeris memecyloides is a species of flowering plant in the family Rubiaceae. It is a shrub native to south-east Asia. The species was described in 1932.

== Taxonomy ==
The species was described by William Grant Craib in 1932.

== Distribution ==
Prismatomeris memecyloides is native to the wet tropical biome of Cambodia, Thailand, and Vietnam.

== Description ==
Prismatomeris memecyloides is a shrub.
