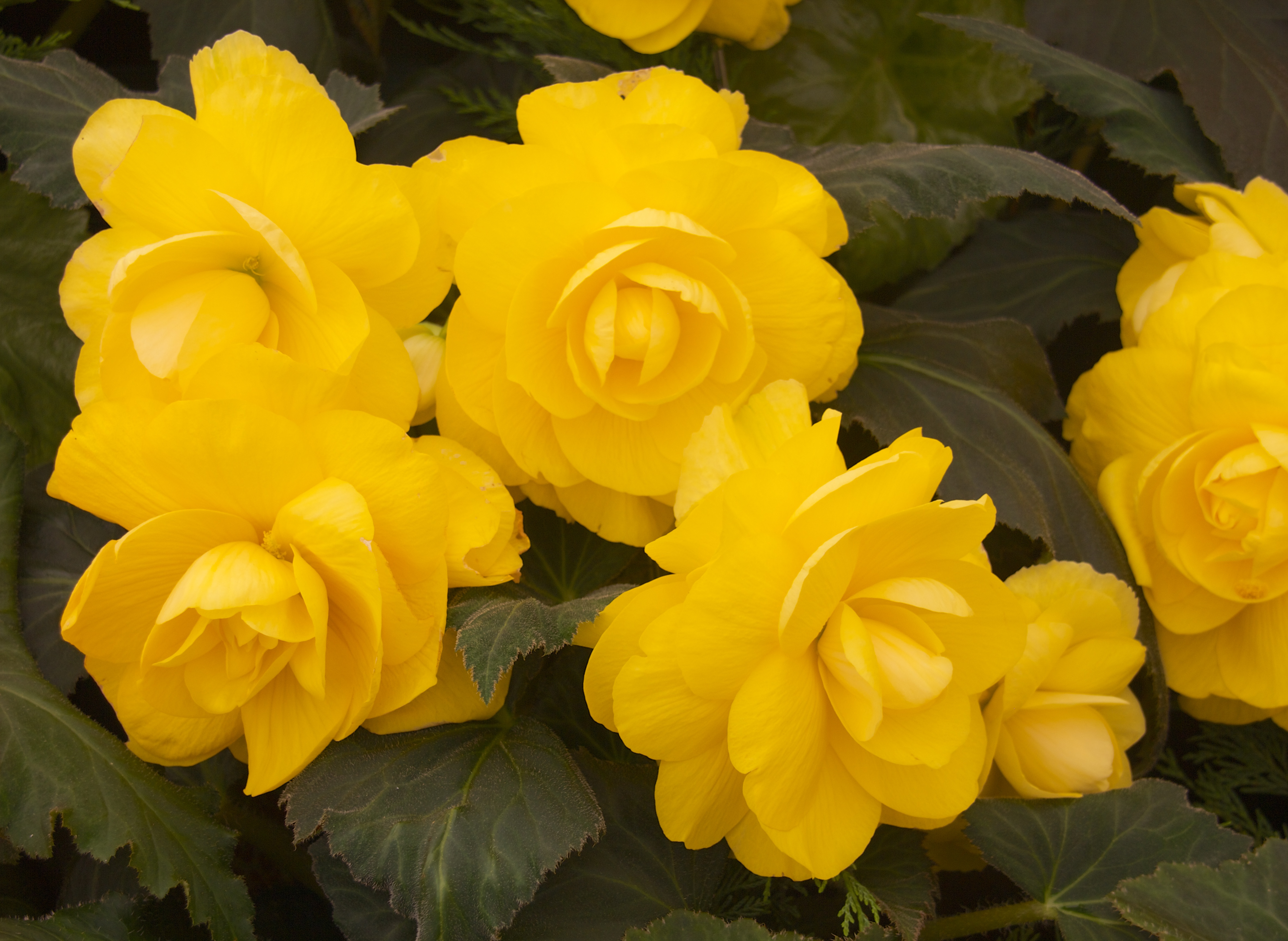
- Flower blossoms of Begonia festiva

Scientific classification
- Kingdom: Plantae
- Clade: Tracheophytes
- Clade: Angiosperms
- Clade: Eudicots
- Clade: Rosids
- Order: Cucurbitales
- Family: Begoniaceae
- Genus: Begonia
- Species: B. festiva

Binomial name
- Begonia festiva Craib, 1930

= Begonia festiva =

Species of flowering plant

Begonia festiva is a species of flowering plant in the family Begoniaceae.
