= Prismatomeris mollis =

Scientific classification
- Kingdom: Plantae
- Clade: Tracheophytes
- Clade: Angiosperms
- Clade: Eudicots
- Clade: Asterids
- Order: Gentianales
- Family: Rubiaceae
- Genus: Prismatomeris
- Species: P. mollis

Binomial name
- Prismatomeris mollis Craib

Species of flowering plant

Prismatomeris mollis is a species of flowering plant in the family Rubiaceae. It is a shrub native to south-east Asia, and was described in 1932.

== Taxonomy ==
The species was described by William Grant Craib in 1932.

== Distribution ==
Prismatomeris mollis is native to the wet tropical biome of Peninsular Thailand and southern Myanmar.

== Description ==
Prismatomeris mollis is a shrub.
