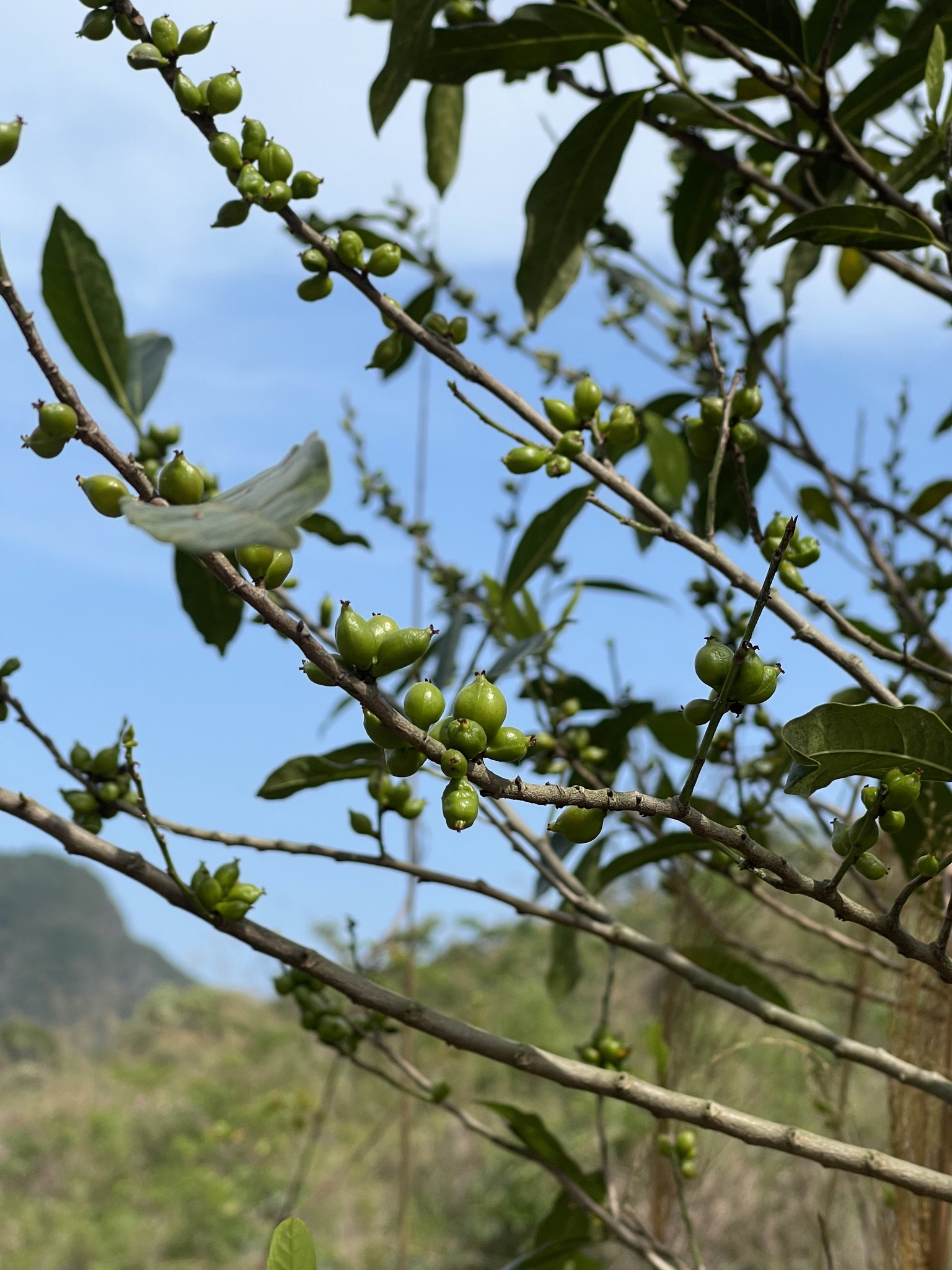

Conservation status
- Least Concern (IUCN 3.1)

Scientific classification
- Kingdom: Plantae
- Clade: Embryophytes
- Clade: Tracheophytes
- Clade: Angiosperms
- Clade: Eudicots
- Clade: Rosids
- Order: Malpighiales
- Family: Phyllanthaceae
- Genus: Aporosa
- Species: A. octandra

Binomial name
- Aporosa octandra (Buch.-Ham. ex D.Don) A.R.Vickery

Synonyms
- Myrica octandra Buch.-Ham. ex D.Don; see below for synonyms of varieties

= Aporosa octandra =

Species of tree

Aporosa octandra

Scientific classification
- Kingdom: Plantae
- Clade: Embryophytes
- Clade: Tracheophytes
- Clade: Angiosperms
- Clade: Eudicots
- Clade: Rosids
- Order: Malpighiales
- Family: Phyllanthaceae
- Genus: Aporosa
- Species: A. octandra
- Variety: A. o. var. chinensis

Trinomial name
- Aporosa octandra var. chinensis (Champ. ex Benth.) Schot

Synonyms
- Aporosa chinensis (Champ. ex Benth.) Merr.; Aporosa leptostachya Benth.; Scepa chinensis Champ. ex Benth.

Aporosa octandra

Scientific classification
- Kingdom: Plantae
- Clade: Embryophytes
- Clade: Tracheophytes
- Clade: Angiosperms
- Clade: Eudicots
- Clade: Rosids
- Order: Malpighiales
- Family: Phyllanthaceae
- Genus: Aporosa
- Species: A. octandra
- Variety: A. o. var. malesiana

Trinomial name
- Aporosa octandra var. malesiana Schot

Synonyms
- Aporosa aurita (Tul.) Miq.; Aporosa cumingiana Baill.; Aporosa microcalyx (Hassk.) Hassk.; Scepa aurita Tul.; Tetractinostigma microcalyx Hassk.

Aporosa octandra

Scientific classification
- Kingdom: Plantae
- Clade: Embryophytes
- Clade: Tracheophytes
- Clade: Angiosperms
- Clade: Eudicots
- Clade: Rosids
- Order: Malpighiales
- Family: Phyllanthaceae
- Genus: Aporosa
- Species: A. octandra
- Variety: A. o. var. octandra

Trinomial name
- Aporosa octandra var. octandra

Synonyms
- Alnus dioica Roxb.; Alnus integrifolia Roxb. ex Steud.; Aporosa clellandii Hook.f.; Aporosa dioica (Roxb.) Müll.Arg.; Aporosa frutescens Benth.; Aporosa glabrifolia Kurz; Aporosa oblonga Müll.Arg.; Aporosa obovata Pax & K.Hoffm.; Aporosa roxburghii (Wall. ex Lindl.) Baill.; Aporosa villosula Kurz; Aporosa wallichii var. ambigua Airy Shaw; Leiocarpus serratus Hassk.; Leiocarpus tinctorius Blume ex Pax & K.Hoffm.; Lepidostachys oblonga Wall.; Lepidostachys roxburghii Wall. ex Lindl.; Scepa stipulacea Lindl.

Aporosa octandra

Scientific classification
- Kingdom: Plantae
- Clade: Embryophytes
- Clade: Tracheophytes
- Clade: Angiosperms
- Clade: Eudicots
- Clade: Rosids
- Order: Malpighiales
- Family: Phyllanthaceae
- Genus: Aporosa
- Species: A. octandra
- Variety: A. o. var. yunnanensis

Trinomial name
- Aporosa octandra var. yunnanensis (Pax & K.Hoffm.) Schot

Synonyms
- Aporosa dioica var. yunnanensis (Pax & K.Hoffm.) H.S.Kiu

Aporosa octandra is a species of plant in the family Phyllanthaceae found from Queensland, Australia, and New Guinea to Indonesia, China and India. It is a highly variable plant with 4 named varieties. Its wood is used in construction and to make implements, its fruit is edible. The Karbi people of Assam use the plant for dyeing.

== Taxonomy, infraspecifics and history ==
A. octandra is in a clade with sisters Aporosa ficifolia, A. planchoniana, A. tetrapleura, and A. villosa, separated from other species within the Appendiculatae section of the Aporosa genus.

=== Infraspecifics ===
In the current major work on Aporosa, Anne M. Schot states in her description of A. octandra and its varieties:

An extremely variable species in leaf size and indumentum, especially in Thailand, where the different forms co-occur, together with almost every thinkable intermediate form. Though so many intermediates occur between the extremes, I will describe the extremes as three varieties (which is, I think, more manageable than lumping all into a confusing mess). Thus, I have, beside the typical form from North India, Burma, Laos, Cambodia, and Vietnam, described three different geographical varieties: one from South China, one from North China, and the one occurring in the Malesian region. The fact that sharp boundaries cannot be made between any of the varieties, means that the dividing characters have to be used strictly. All intermediates (and there are many!) are thus automatically left simply as A. octandra.

There are four accepted varieties:

- Aporosa octandra var. chinensis (Champ. ex Benth.) Schot
- Aporosa octandra var. malesiana Schot
- Aporosa octandra var. octandra
- Aporosa octandra var. yunnanensis (Pax & K.Hoffm.) Schot

=== History ===
The species was described in 1982 by the botanist Albert Roy Vickery, in the publication An Enumeration of the Flowering Plants of Nepal (London), which was a joint project of the British Museum (Natural History) and the University of Tokyo. This work superseded that of Francis Buchanan-Hamilton and David Don.

The varieties were first described by Anne M. Schot in 1995 in the article A synopsis of taxonomic changes in Aporosa Blume (Euphorbiaceae), published in the journal Blumea.

== Description ==
The tree, sometimes shrub, which grows up to 15m tall, and up to 30 cm in diameter. In India the tree may grow some 9-12m tall, but is usually shrubby. The bark is a light-brown to grey or tan, can be either smooth, roughened, thickened, flaky or with narrow vertical ridges and cracks. Inner bark is pink. The wood is cream in colour. The branchlets usually have a few small scars of fallen leaves. The leaves are narrow, ovate to elliptic in shape, some 5-23.5 by 2-8 cm in size, base is rounded to cuneate, obtuse in shape, the margins are lowly undulate to lowly glandular-crenate or -serrate and are sometimes slightly recurved; the apex of the leaves is acuminate to cuspitate; the leave are thinnish and smooth, not brittle and dull or slightly shiny; when dry they are grey-brown to green-brown above, greenish to brownish below. Inflorescences occur axillary or just below leaves. Staminate inflorescences occur as 1-5 cluster together, with 6-8 laxly set flowers, staminate flowers have 4 sepals and two stamens. Pistillate inflorescences occur as 1 to 3 clustered together, with up to 11 densely arranged flowers along the rachis, 4 sepals, occasionallyy staminodes, slightly raised and elongated stigmas, perpendicular to the sides of the ovary. The fruit are ovoid to ellipsoid in shape, rarely globose; slightly stiped and beaked young fruit are 9-13 x 6-10mm in size, punctate; they dry to dark brown/black, with sparse hairs. Terete, ellipsoid seeds (1 maybe 2 per fruit) are 7-8 x 5-6 x 3-4mm.

Like other species in the Appendiculatae section of the Aporosa genus, this species has: glands that are basal and adaxial; disc-like glands scattered unevenly within arches of marginal veins throughout the abaxial surface of the leaf/lamina; stigma that are papillate; and theovary has pubescent septae and column.

Noting the caveat given above by Schot, the varieties are described as follows:

=== A. octandra var. octandra ===
Puberulous branchlets; narrowly elliptic to same ovate leaves; with a glandular-serrate margin; thin leaves drying dull greyish brown on both sides and sparsely puberulous and glabrescent; in the pistillate flowers> the ovary is puberulous.

In China the variety octandra grows as a tree up to 9m tall, but usually shorter, some 2m tall, and more shrubby in secondary forest in China. The Flora of China describes the variety with slight differences: It has hirtellous/hairy to glabrous/smooth branchlets. The ovate-lanceolate stipules are 4-6mm, while the sparsely pubescent petiole is 5-12mm and has bilateral apex with 2 glands. The leathery leaf blade ranges from elliptic to narrowly ovate, oblong-elliptic, obovate and oblanceolate, is 6-12 x 3.5-6 cm in size, glabrous and adaxially lucid, is sparsely pubescent abaxially along nerves, has a round or cuneate base with an entire or sparsely shallowly dentate margin, and rounded to acute apex. The female flowers have 4-6 triangular sepals with ciliate margins, ovoid ovary which is densely pubescent and bilocular, with 2 ovules per locule. The male flowers grow in axillary spikes some 2.5 x 0.4 cm in size, with ovate-triangular bracts some 1mm long, which are pubescent on the outside, usually about 4 oblong-ovate sepals, 2 to four stamens, which are longer that the sepals. The ellipsoid capsules are 1 to 1.3 cm in size, are pubescent and 2-seeded. The subovate seeds are some 9 by 5.5mm. Flowering and fruiting occur almost throughout the year.

The plant seems to be deciduous in some areas, particularly Thailand, indicating a preference for a seasonal climate.

Stem specific density is 0.62g/cm^{3.}

=== A. octandra var. chinensis ===
Sparsely puberulous branchlets; narrowly elliptic to obovate leaves with gandular-serrate margin, thinnish and shiny leaf, drying to bright-greenish or greenish-brown above and brownish beneath, sparsely puberulous; the pistillate flowers have a sparsely sericeous ovary which is glabrescent towards the apex.

=== A. octandra var. malesiana ===
Tomentose branchlets; narrowly ovate to same elliptic leaves with a (lowly) glandular-serrate margin, thin and slightly shiny leaf, drying greyish to brownish both sides, sparsely puberulous, with puberulous midrib and nerves on underside; the flowers are pistillate with a tomentose ovary.

Stem specific density is 0.67g/cm^{3}. While describing the wood of this species as cream in colour, Schot also quotes a description of the wood of this variety as being dark.

=== A. octandra var. yunnanensis ===
Tomentose branchlets; the leaves are narrowly ovate to same elliptic, with a slightly glandular-serrate margin, they are thickish and rather shiny, dry brownish to greyish, sometimes greyish-green above, while beneath they dry brownish to greyish, leaves are (sparsely) tomentose as is the nervation; the pistillate flowers have a tomentose ovary. This variety is very difficult to distinguish from the closely related Aporosa villosa, both have tomentose indumentum, the only reliable character to make a distinction is that A. villosa has an ovate leaf with a (lowly) cordate base; the more distinct glandular-serrate leaf margin of A. octandra var. yunnanensis is probably distinctive from the less well-developed leaf margin of A. villosa. On the islands of the Mekong river in Kratié and Steung Treng Provinces, northern Cambodia, this variety flowers in January and February, fruits from April to May, and loses its leaves for December and January.

== Distribution ==
The species is found in from Queensland, Australia to New Guinea, through Southeast Asia to southern China and India. Countries and regions in which it is native to include: Australia (Queensland); Papua New Guinea; Indonesia (West Papua, Sulawesi, Kalimantan, Java, Sumatra); Philippines; Malaysia (Sabah, Sarawak, Peninsular Malaysia); Thailand; Cambodia; Vietnam; China (Hainan, South-Central, Southeast); Laos; Myanmar; India (Nicobar Islands, Andaman Islands, Assam, Nagaland, Manipur, Mizoram, Tripura, Meghalaya, Sikkim, West Bengal, Odisha, Uttarakhand); Bangladesh; East and West Himalaya; Bhutan; Nepal.

A. octandra var. chinensis is found from Southeast China (including Hainan) to northern Vietnam.

A. octandra var. malesiana is found from parts of Malesia to southwestern Thailand. Countries and regions in which it is native include: Philippines; Indonesia (Sulawesi, Kalimantan, Sumatra, Java); Malaysia (Sabah, Sarawak, Peninsular Malaysia); Thailand (southwest). It is noted that it has been recorded in error in New Guinea and Queensland.

The native distribution of the autonym variety A. octandra var. octandra is from Southeast Asia to South Central China and the Himalayas. Countries and regions in which it occurs are: Thailand; Cambodia; Vietnam; China (Guangdong, Guangxi, Hainan); Laos; Myanmar; India (Nicobar Islands, Andaman Islands, Assam, and other areas); Bangladesh; East and West Himalaya region; Nepal.

A. octandra var. yunnanensis is native to an area of Southeast Asia to Yunnan (China). Countries and regions in which it grows are: Thailand; Cambodia; Myanmar; Laos; and Yunnan (China).

== Habitat and ecology ==
The species grows in a variety of habitats: primary, secondary, subtropical, evergreen, and (mixed) deciduous forests, savannah, belukar (low forest/scrub, perhaps anthropogenic), moist to rather dry. It favours shaded understorey or (partly) open places (though see below in Hong Kong). The tree tends to be a gallery species, favouring hills, (steep) slopes, forest edges, road sides, plains, thickets and alongside watercourses. It is found in a wide range of soils: from sandy to sandstone, granitic sand, limestone, clay, rocky to rocky loam, on granite or sandstone bedrocks. Grows at altitudes from 40m to 1500m. The plant generally flowers and fruits throughout the year.

In the Na Haeo Forest Reserve (Na Haeo District, Loei Province, northeastern Thailand), A. octandra var. yunnanensis is locally dominant in the bamboo-deciduous forest, alongside Cananga brandisiana, Croton persimilis, Gardenia sootepensis, Lagerstroemia sp., Colona flagrocarpa and Pterocarpus macrocarpus. In the medium layer of the forest (some 6-9m tall), the varieties octandra and yunnanensis are common, along with Quercus kerrii, Memecylon scutellatum, Harrisonia perforata and a dense bamboo understory. The bamboo cover is so high that in order to increase woody tree species richness and diversity, that control measures on the bamboo may be advisable.

There is a project of reforestation in the Doi Tung mountainous area of northern Thailand. Two varieties of A. octandra grow in the area. Both are deciduous trees in habit at this place, flower in January and February and fruit in May and June. The octandra variety grows in both evergreen with bamboo forest and disturbed areas (including roadsides); it grows on soils derived from granite and limestone bedrocks; is found between 1200 and 1375m altitutude; and has leaves from May until December. The yunnanensis variety grows in evergreen forest; in soils derived from granite bedrock; at elevations of 1100 to 1450m; and has leaves from April to December.

On the islands of the Mekong river in Kratié and Steung Treng Provinces, northern Cambodia, the variety yunnanensis is moderarately common in dipterous deciduous forest, and also occurs in degraded areas and secondary growth communities. The tree is deciduous in this area, grows on sediments derived from metamorphic sandstone bedrock, at about 25 to 30m.a.s.l.

In India it is commonly found in primary forests and grasslands, growing on sandy, clay or rocky soil, at up to 1200 m altitude.

Mizoram University (India) is embedded in a regenerating tropical wet evergreen and semi-evergreen forest. The dominant trees of this forest are Schima wallichii, Aporosa octandra, Castanopsis tribuloides, and Syzgium praecox.

The now regenerating forests of Hong Kong were heavily degraded in the 19th and early 20th centuries with the most impact occurring during World War II (here 1941-5). A. octandra is not only one of the light demanding early pioneers in the rainforest, but is also an indicator species, alongside Garcinia oblongifolia of early pioneer communities that tend to disappear as more mature vegetation communities take over. This causes the pioneer communities to have higher diversity than more established vegetation.

The variety octandra grows in montane sparse forests or scrub in China.

The whitefly species Cockerelliella setosus, of Little Andaman Island (India), infests A. octandra.

Hanuman langurs (Semnopithecus entellus) in subtropical forest of Nepal eat the young leafy parts and inflorescences, but not the fruits, thus playing no part in the plants dispersal.

Three insect species have been recorded forming galls on the leaves or twigs of the species: Dolcrothrips tryboni, Acerocecidium sp., and Eriophyes aporosae.

== Conservation ==
The species is rated as at Least Concern by the IUCN Redlist. This is because the tree has a very wide distribution with a large population and that it is not at the moment and foreseeable future experiencing any major threats. However, the populations are severely fragmented, there is a continuing decline of mature specimen, and there is a continuing decline in the area, extent and quality of habitat.

== Vernacular names ==
- sarei (Borneo)
- (kayu) rasak (kayu="tree/wood", Martapura, South Kalimantan)
- somarog (Bisayan languages, Philippines)
- kayu pe(a)langas (Sumatra)
- p(e)(a)langas (Bangka Island, Sumatra)
- lalimau (Malay, Peninsular Malaysia)
- grom (Trang Province, Thailand)
- kam' phnië:ng (Khmer language)
- chhawntual (Mizo)
- tamsir (Karbi language, Assam).
- massania, pata kharalla, kasua (local names in Odisha and other regions of India)
- chantal (common name in India)
- kalikath (common in Nepal)
- keechua (Pakistan)
- 银柴, yin chai (Standard Chinese).
- kam shu (China)
- tai ip kam (Hainan)

== Uses ==
The tree/shrub provides fodder for domesticated animals, timber for house construction (particularly house-posts), wood for fuel. The bark yields a red dye, while a decoction of the leaves is used to dye clothes black in northeast India. The fruits are edible. The bark is chewed as a kind of betel In India, the wood (called kokra or coco wood) is used, it is described as durable, hard and close-grained. It is used in construction, and for house-posts, rafters, rice pounders, and furniture.

The Karbi people in Karbi Anglong district (Assam, India) use the twigs and leaves of what they call tamsir as a mordant when using black minerals to dye yarn black. The leaves are additionally used to prevent the yarn making contact with the dyeing vessel, which is held to make the yarn brittle. This latter use also occurs when dyeing with the lac insect Kerria lacca, to make pink yarn.

There are many recorded uses of the species in traditional medicine in Asia, including in old Ayurvedic medical practices. In Cambodia the bark is a component of a folk-remedy to relieve tooth-ache, while the roots are used in another folk-medicine mixture to be used "against women diseases after delivery". In Mizoram it is recorded as treating many ailments.

A. octandra var. malesiana has hard wood that is used for planks in houses, and for beams or furniture.
