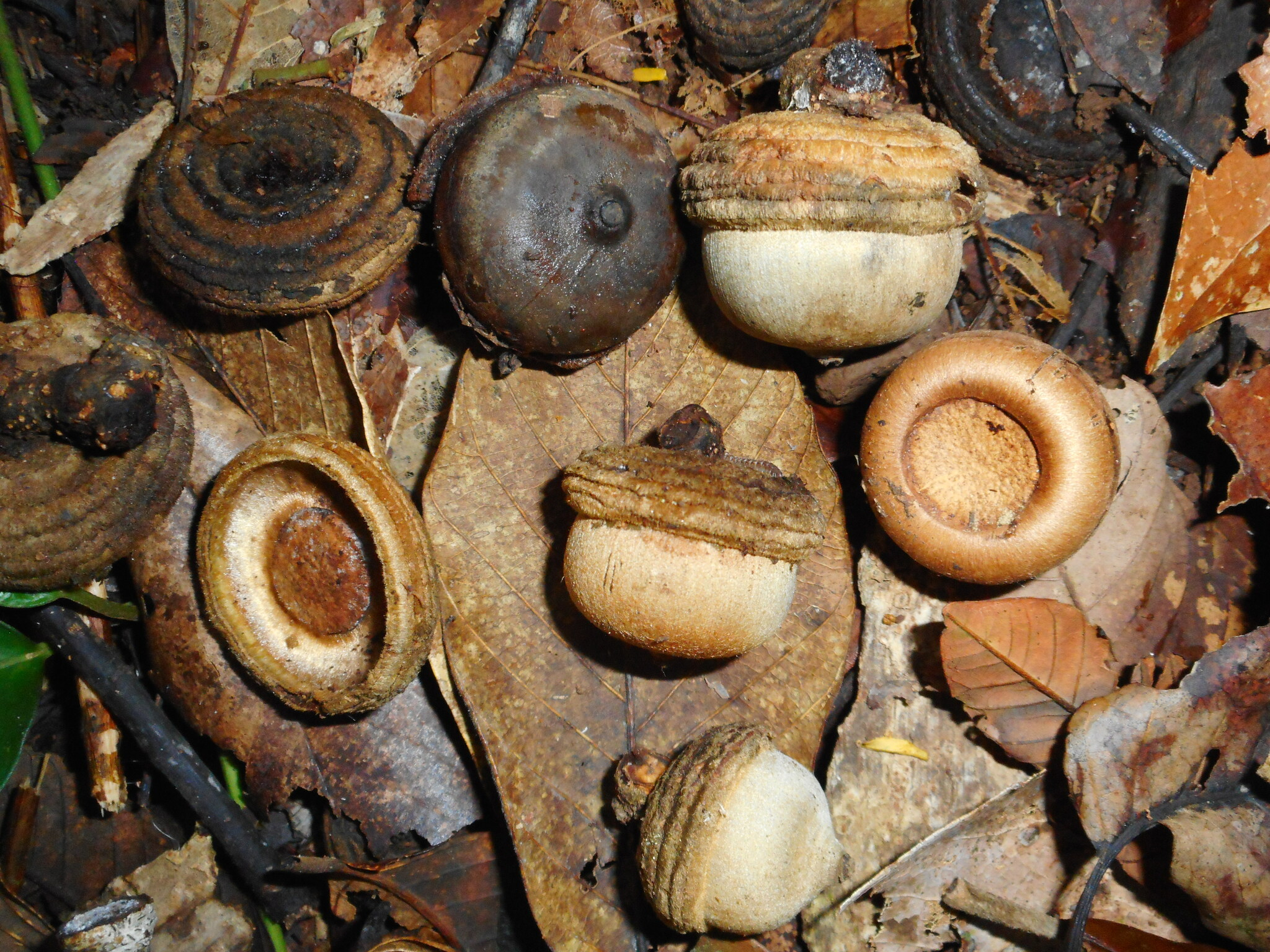

Conservation status
- Least Concern (IUCN 3.1)

Scientific classification
- Kingdom: Plantae
- Clade: Embryophytes
- Clade: Tracheophytes
- Clade: Spermatophytes
- Clade: Angiosperms
- Clade: Eudicots
- Clade: Rosids
- Order: Fagales
- Family: Fagaceae
- Genus: Quercus
- Subgenus: Quercus subg. Cerris
- Section: Quercus sect. Cyclobalanopsis
- Species: Q. kerrii

Binomial name
- Quercus kerrii Craib (1911)

Synonyms
- Cyclobalanopsis kerrii (Craib) Hu; Quercus dispar Chun & Tsiang 1947 not Raf. 1838; Quercus dussaudii Hickel & A.Camus

= Quercus kerrii =

Species of oak tree

Quercus kerrii is an uncommon Asian species of tree in the family Fagaceae. It is native to northern Indochina, ranging from southeastern Bangladesh through Myanmar, Thailand, Laos, and Vietnam to south-central China and Hainan. There are also populations in southern China that according to some authors belong to Q. kerrii but considered by others to belong to a different species, Q. helferiana. Quercus kerrii is placed in subgenus Cerris, section Cyclobalanopsis. Its Chinese name is mao ye qing gang.

== Description ==
Quercus kerrii is a tree up to 20 m. tall with hairy twigs. Leaves can be as much as 240 mm long. The acorn is oblate, 7–12 × 20–28 mm, apex depressed to flat, with a scar that is 10–20 mm in diameter and slightly convex. The leathery leaves are either evergreen or nearly evergreen. The leaves shape is either oblong or elliptic, and lanceolate. The margin is apical 2/3 serrate. The apex is either slightly obtuse or shortly acuminate. The base is rounded or broadly cuneate. The leaves are shiny green on the top and are hairy on the bottom. There are between 10 and 14 veins pairs. The pistillate inflorescence is between 2 and 6 centimeters long. The acorns are between 0.7 and 1.3 centimeters high and between 2 and 2.8 centimeters in diameter. The acorns are on a 4 centimeters long peduncle. The raised basal scar was between 1 and 2 centimeters wide. The acorns mature in 1 year. In China, flowering is from March–May, acorns can be found from October–November.

This species and Quercus helferiana are closely related: the relationship between them and their distribution needs further work and it is possible that Q. kerrii does not occur in China.

== Uses ==
The cooked acorns are edible. The seeds are usually cooked before being eaten, although they can also be eaten raw. The seeds also can be eaten in whole, but is more likely to be dried, grounded into a powder, and added to stews or cereals. The roasted seeds of many Quercus species have been used as a coffee substitute. Extracts of this species are used to heal cuts. It can be used to treat toothache and gum problems. It is also used as an infusion to treat acute diarrhea, dysentery and haemorrhages. It produces oak galls, which are used as rich source of tannin and dyestuff which is used by many cultures to make ink. The pale yellow wood is used for constriction and fuel.
