= Prismatomeris glabra =

Conservation status
- Least Concern (IUCN 3.1)

Scientific classification
- Kingdom: Plantae
- Clade: Tracheophytes
- Clade: Angiosperms
- Clade: Eudicots
- Clade: Asterids
- Order: Gentianales
- Family: Rubiaceae
- Genus: Prismatomeris
- Species: P. glabra

Binomial name
- Prismatomeris glabra (Korth.) Valeton

Synonyms
- Coffea glabra Korth.; Coffea lepidophloia Miq.; Coffea neurophylla Miq.; Prismatomeris lepidophloia (Miq.) Ridl.; Prismatomeris neurophylla (Miq.) Ridl.

Species of flowering plant

Prismatomeris glabra is a species of flowering plant in the family Rubiaceae. It is a shrub or tree native to south-east Asia. The species was described in 1851, and is listed as of Least Concern by the IUCN.

== Taxonomy ==
The species was described by Pieter Willem Korthals in 1851, and placed in the genus Coffea. In 1910, Theodoric Valeton moved it to the genus Prismatomeris.

== Distribution ==
Prismatomeris glabra is native to the wet tropical biome of Borneo (including Sabah, Sarawak, and Kalimantan and possibly Brunei), Java, Peninsular Malaysia, Sumatra, and Singapore. It grows at elevations of up to 1,200 metres (3,900 ft), in kerangas, mixed dipterocarp forests, swampy areas, coastal areas, and montane evergreen forests.

== Description ==
Prismatomeris glabra is a shrub or small tree.

== Conservation ==
In 2023, the IUCN assessed Prismatomeris glabra as of Least Concern. The species is found in protected areas. It may be threatened by land-use change.
