= Prismatomeris khoonmengiana =

Conservation status
- Vulnerable (IUCN 3.1)

Scientific classification
- Kingdom: Plantae
- Clade: Tracheophytes
- Clade: Angiosperms
- Clade: Eudicots
- Clade: Asterids
- Order: Gentianales
- Family: Rubiaceae
- Genus: Prismatomeris
- Species: P. khoonmengiana

Binomial name
- Prismatomeris khoonmengiana Y.W.Low

Synonyms
- Coffea malayana Ridl.

Species of flowering plant

Prismatomeris khoonmengiana is a species of flowering plant in the family Rubiaceae. It is a shrub or tree with thinly leathery leaves, white or cream flowers, and black fruits. The species is native to Malaysia.

Prismatomeris khoonmengiana was described in 1912, and is listed as Vulnerable by the IUCN.

== Taxonomy ==
In 1912, Henry Nicholas Ridley named Coffea malayana, a synonym of Prismatomeris khoonmengiana. The species was moved to Prismatomeris by Yee Wen Low in 2015. The specific epithet was changed, as the name Prismatomeris malayana was already used for another taxon.

== Distribution ==
Prismatomeris khoonmengiana is native to the wet tropical biome of west and south Peninsular Malaysia. Its extent of occurrence is estimated at slightly over 36,000 square kilometres (14,000 sq mi). The species grows in lowland dipterocarp forests, at elevations of up to 450 metres (1,480 ft).

== Description ==
Prismatomeris khoonmengiana is a shrub or small tree that grows up to 5 metres (16 ft) high. The twigs are pale.

The leaves are oblong to broadly elliptical, 18–21 centimetres (7.1–8.3 in) long, 6–7 centimetres (2.4–2.8 in) wide, and thinly leathery. The leaf stems are 1.5–2 centimetres (0.59–0.79 in) long.

The inflorescence is a compact cyme, measuring 6–8 centimetres (2.4–3.1 in) long. It lacks a stem. The calyx is cupuliform, and has up to six teeth at the mouth. The calyx tube is 1.5–2 millimetres (0.059–0.079 in) long, and 2–2.5 millimetres (0.079–0.098 in) wide at the apex. The corolla is white or cream, hypocrateriform, 12–21 millimetres (0.47–0.83 in) long, 0.7–1 millimetre (0.028–0.039 in) wide at the mid-portion, and 1.5–2.5 millimetres (0.059–0.098 in) wide at the throat. The corolla has four or five lobes, which are oblanceolate, 7–10 millimetres (0.28–0.39 in) long, and 1–1.9 millimetres (0.039–0.075 in) wide. The flowers have four or five stamens.

The fruits are globose or subglobose, 6–7 millimetres (0.24–0.28 in) long, 6–6.5 millimetres (0.24–0.26 in) wide, and black when ripe. The seeds are smooth, dark brown, globose, around 4.7 millimetres (0.19 in) long, and around 5 millimetres (0.20 in) wide.

== Conservation ==
In 2023, the IUCN assessed Prismatomeris khoonmengiana as Vulnerable. It is rare, and not found in protected areas.

== Etymology ==
Prismatomeris khoonmengiana is named after Wong Khoon Meng, a researcher at the Singapore Botanic Gardens, who was the first to consider placing the species in Prismatomeris.
