= Aporosa latifolia =

Scientific classification
- Kingdom: Plantae
- Clade: Tracheophytes
- Clade: Angiosperms
- Clade: Eudicots
- Clade: Rosids
- Order: Malpighiales
- Family: Phyllanthaceae
- Genus: Aporosa
- Species: A. latifolia

Binomial name
- Aporosa latifolia Moon ex Thwaites

Synonyms
- Agyneia latifolia Moon

Species of flowering plant

Aporosa latifolia is a species of plant in the family Phyllanthaceae. It is endemic to Sri Lanka.
