= Aporosa symplocifolia =

Conservation status
- Least Concern (IUCN 3.1)

Scientific classification
- Kingdom: Plantae
- Clade: Tracheophytes
- Clade: Angiosperms
- Clade: Eudicots
- Clade: Rosids
- Order: Malpighiales
- Family: Phyllanthaceae
- Genus: Aporosa
- Species: A. symplocifolia

Binomial name
- Aporosa symplocifolia Merr.

Synonyms
- Aporosa elliptifolia Merr.

Species of flowering plant

Aporosa symplocifolia is a species of plant in the family Phyllanthaceae. It is endemic to the Philippines. Under the synonym Aporosa elliptifolia, it was classed as "vulnerable" in 1998, but in 2021, it is classed as of "least concern".
