= Prismatomeris beccariana =

Conservation status
- Least Concern (IUCN 3.1)

Scientific classification
- Kingdom: Plantae
- Clade: Tracheophytes
- Clade: Angiosperms
- Clade: Eudicots
- Clade: Asterids
- Order: Gentianales
- Family: Rubiaceae
- Genus: Prismatomeris
- Species: P. beccariana

Binomial name
- Prismatomeris beccariana (Baill. ex K.Schum.) J.T.Johanss.

Synonyms
- Morinda beccariana Baill. ex K.Schum.; Tribrachya beccariana (Baill. ex K.Schum.) Boerl.; Zeuxanthe beccariana (Baill. ex K.Schum.) Ridl.; Prismatomeris euphlebia Merr.; Rennellia prismatomeriformis Merr.; Zeuxanthe moultonii Ridl.; Zeuxanthe prismatomeriformis (Merr.) Ridl.

Species of flowering plant

Prismatomeris beccariana is a species of flowering plant in the family Rubiaceae. It is a tree native to Borneo. The species was first validly described in 1891, and is listed as of Least Concern by the IUCN.

== Taxonomy ==
Prismatomeris beccariana was first validly published by Karl Moritz Schumann in 1891, following an earlier invalid publication by Henri Ernest Baillon. It was initially placed in the genus Morinda. In 1987, Jan Thomas Johansson placed it in the genus Prismatomeris.

== Distribution ==
Prismatomeris beccariana is native to the wet tropical biome of Borneo. It is found in Sabah, Sarawak, Brunei and Kalimantan. The species' estimated extent of occurrence is 549,208 square kilometres (212,050 sq mi).

Prismatomeris beccariana grows at elevations of up to 1,400 metres (4,600 ft).

== Description ==
Prismatomeris beccariana is a tree. It grows up to 10 metres (33 ft) high.

== Conservation ==
In 2026, the IUCN assessed Prismatomeris beccariana as of Least Concern. It occurs in protected areas, including Maliau Basin, Gunung Mulu National Park, Ulu Temburong National Park, and Kayan Mentarang National Park.

The species faces no major threats, though some populations are affected by land use change.
