= Aporosa lanceolata =

Conservation status
- Vulnerable (IUCN 2.3)

Scientific classification
- Kingdom: Plantae
- Clade: Tracheophytes
- Clade: Angiosperms
- Clade: Eudicots
- Clade: Rosids
- Order: Malpighiales
- Family: Phyllanthaceae
- Genus: Aporosa
- Species: A. lanceolata

Binomial name
- Aporosa lanceolata (Tul.) Thw.

Synonyms
- Agyneia multilocularis Moon; Lepidostachys lanceolata Tul.

Species of flowering plant

Aporosa lanceolata is a species of plant in the family Phyllanthaceae. It is endemic to Sri Lanka.

== Leaves ==
Oblong-lanceolate, acute base, caudate to acuminate apex.

== Trunk ==
Branches slender.

== Flowers ==
They are sessile, very small, and yellow in color; Inflorescence - spikes; trees dioecious.

== Fruits ==
Small, nearly sessile, axillary clusters, globose, two-valved, yellow pulp.

== Ecology ==
Rain forest understory of wet zone.

== Uses ==
Fruit- edible.
