= Aporosa acuminata =

Scientific classification
- Kingdom: Plantae
- Clade: Tracheophytes
- Clade: Angiosperms
- Clade: Eudicots
- Clade: Rosids
- Order: Malpighiales
- Family: Phyllanthaceae
- Genus: Aporosa
- Species: A. acuminata

Binomial name
- Aporosa acuminata Thwaites

Species of flowering plant

Aporosa acuminata is a species of plant in the family Phyllanthaceae. It is endemic to Western Ghats of India and Sri Lanka. It is an understory tree with 5m tall. Flowers are unisexual and dioecious, where male flowers are green to white in color. Reddish capsular fruits are one-seeded.

== Common names ==
- Tamil: Neervetti, nirvetti
- Malayalam: Nirvetti, nirvittil
