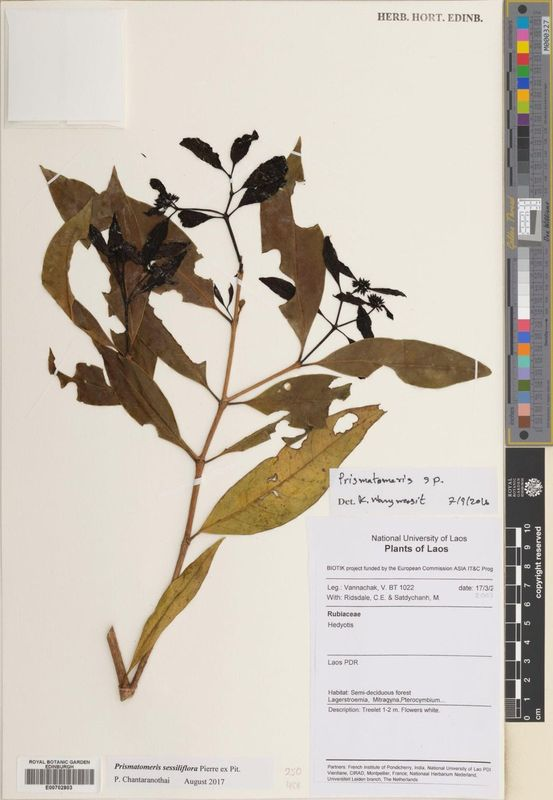

Scientific classification
- Kingdom: Plantae
- Clade: Embryophytes
- Clade: Tracheophytes
- Clade: Spermatophytes
- Clade: Angiosperms
- Clade: Eudicots
- Clade: Asterids
- Order: Gentianales
- Family: Rubiaceae
- Genus: Prismatomeris
- Species: P. sessiliflora

Binomial name
- Prismatomeris sessiliflora Pierre ex Pit.

= Prismatomeris sessiliflora =

Species of flowering plant

Prismatomeris sessiliflora is a species of flowering plant in the family Rubiaceae. It is a shrub native to south-east Asia. The species' name was first validly published in 1924.

== Taxonomy ==
The species was first published invalidly by Jean Baptiste Louis Pierre. In 1924, Charles-Joseph Marie Pitard published the name validly.

== Distribution ==
Prismatomeris sessiliflora is native to the wet tropical biome of Cambodia, Laos, Thailand, and Vietnam.

== Description ==
Prismatomeris sessiliflora is a shrub.

== Ecology ==
Prismatomeris sessiliflora is eaten by Asian elephants.
