= Prismatomeris obtusifolia =

Scientific classification
- Kingdom: Plantae
- Clade: Tracheophytes
- Clade: Angiosperms
- Clade: Eudicots
- Clade: Asterids
- Order: Gentianales
- Family: Rubiaceae
- Genus: Prismatomeris
- Species: P. obtusifolia

Binomial name
- Prismatomeris obtusifolia Merr.

Species of flowering plant

Prismatomeris obtusifolia is a species of flowering plant in the family Rubiaceae. It is a shrub native to the Philippines, and was described in 1925.

== Taxonomy ==
The species was described by Elmer Drew Merrill in 1925.

== Distribution ==
Prismatomeris obtusifolia is native to the wet tropical biome of Palawan, Philippines.

== Description ==
Prismatomeris obtusifolia is a shrub.
