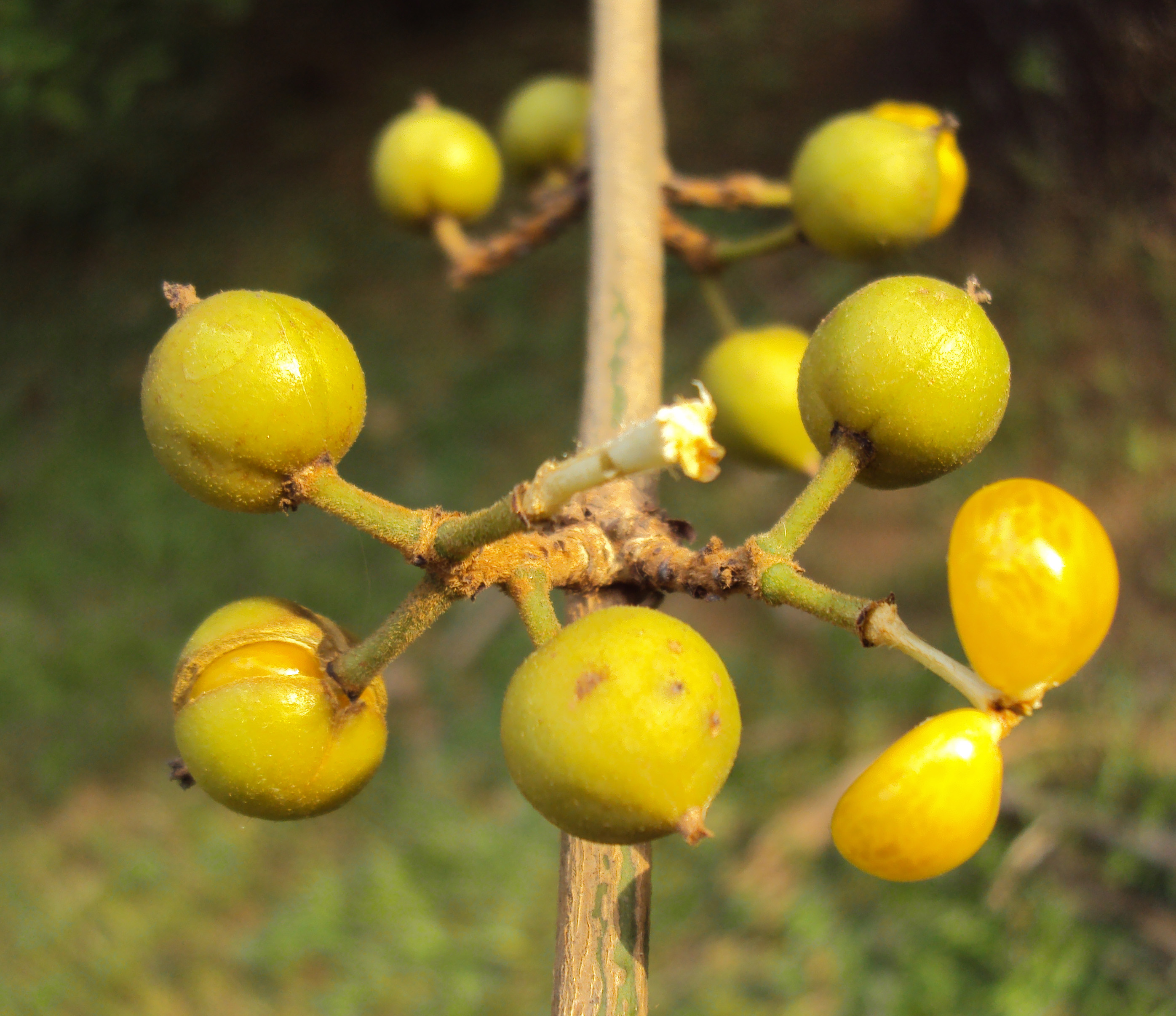
- Fruits

Conservation status
- Vulnerable (IUCN 2.3)

Scientific classification
- Kingdom: Plantae
- Clade: Tracheophytes
- Clade: Angiosperms
- Clade: Eudicots
- Clade: Rosids
- Order: Malpighiales
- Family: Phyllanthaceae
- Genus: Aporosa
- Species: A. cardiosperma

Binomial name
- Aporosa cardiosperma (Gaertn.) Merr.

Synonyms
- A. affinis Baill.; A. lindleyana (Wight) Baill.; A. sphaerocarpa Müll.Arg.

= Aporosa cardiosperma =

Species of flowering plant

Aporosa cardiosperma is a species of plant in the family Phyllanthaceae. It is endemic to South-West India and Sri Lanka. The fruit has two seeds covered with sour gelatinous pulp that is fed on by birds (and edible for humans) which disperse the seeds. In the Western Ghats of India, the thin stems of the tree are often galled by Cecidomyiidae. An echinate gall formation has also been noted in Kerala.

A herbal concoction of the leaves is used in traditional remedies for jaundice and other conditions. Antioxidant and hypoglycemia inducing properties of its extracts have been noted in laboratory studies.

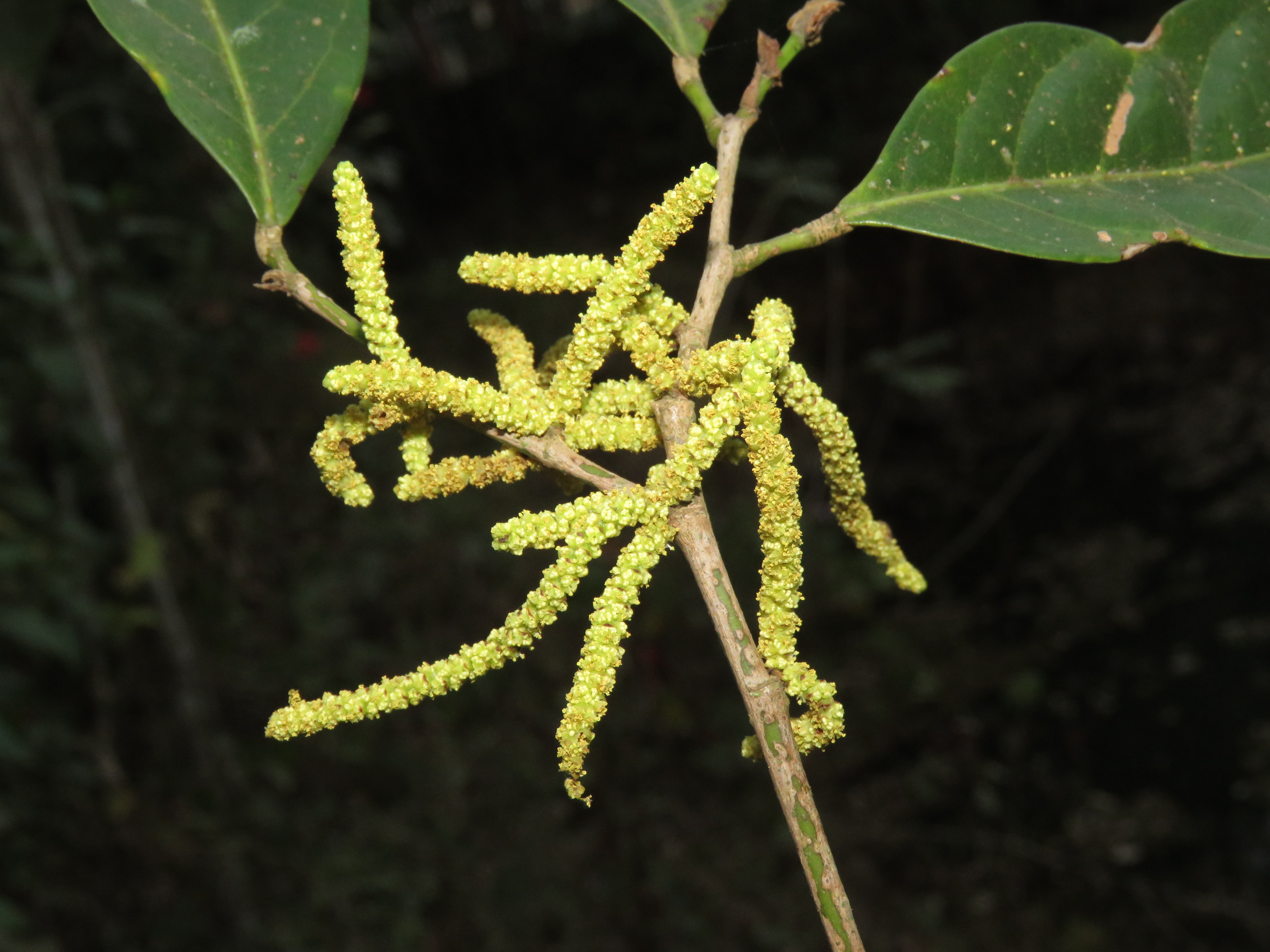
Flowers

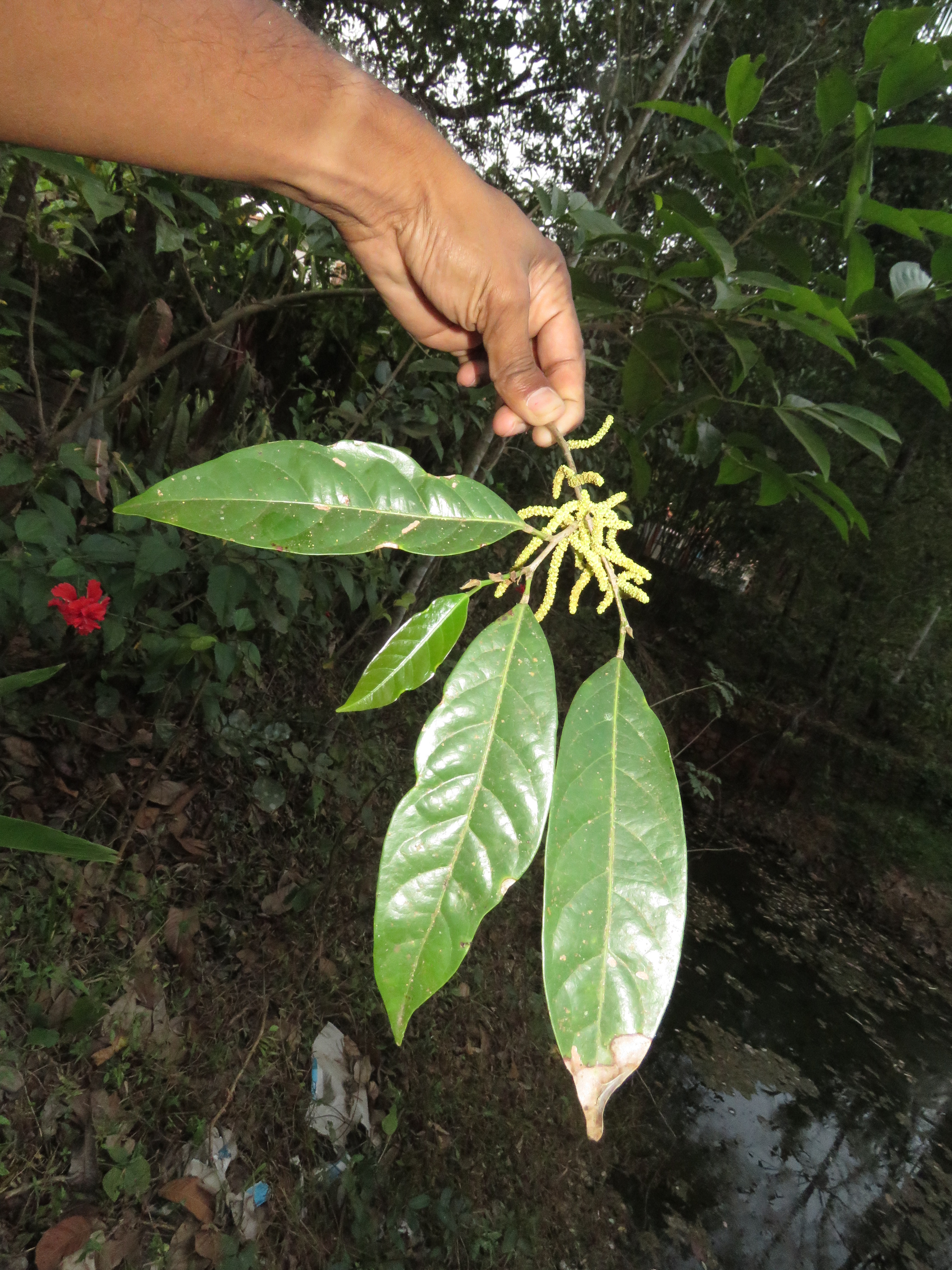
Leaves

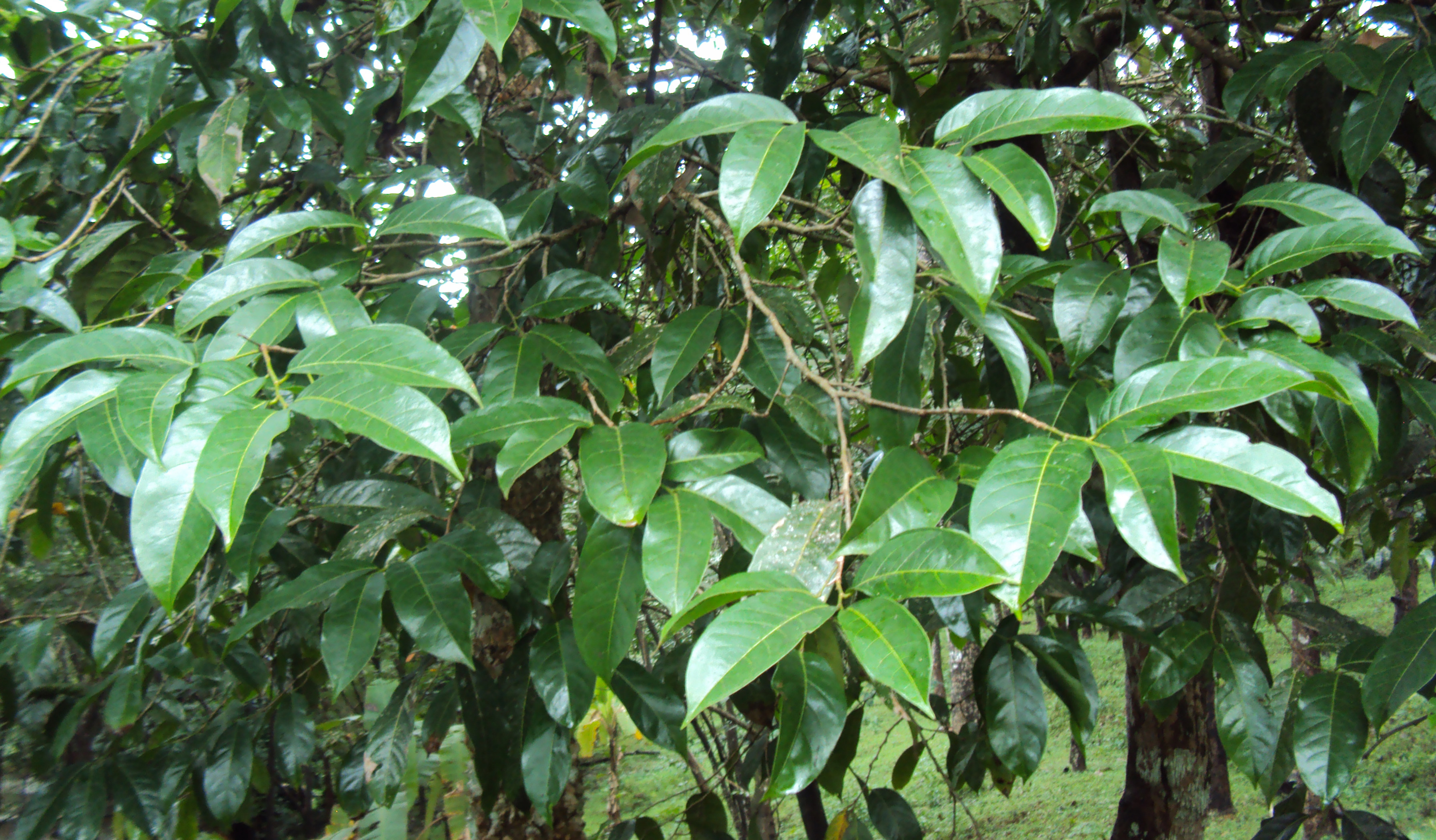
Tree

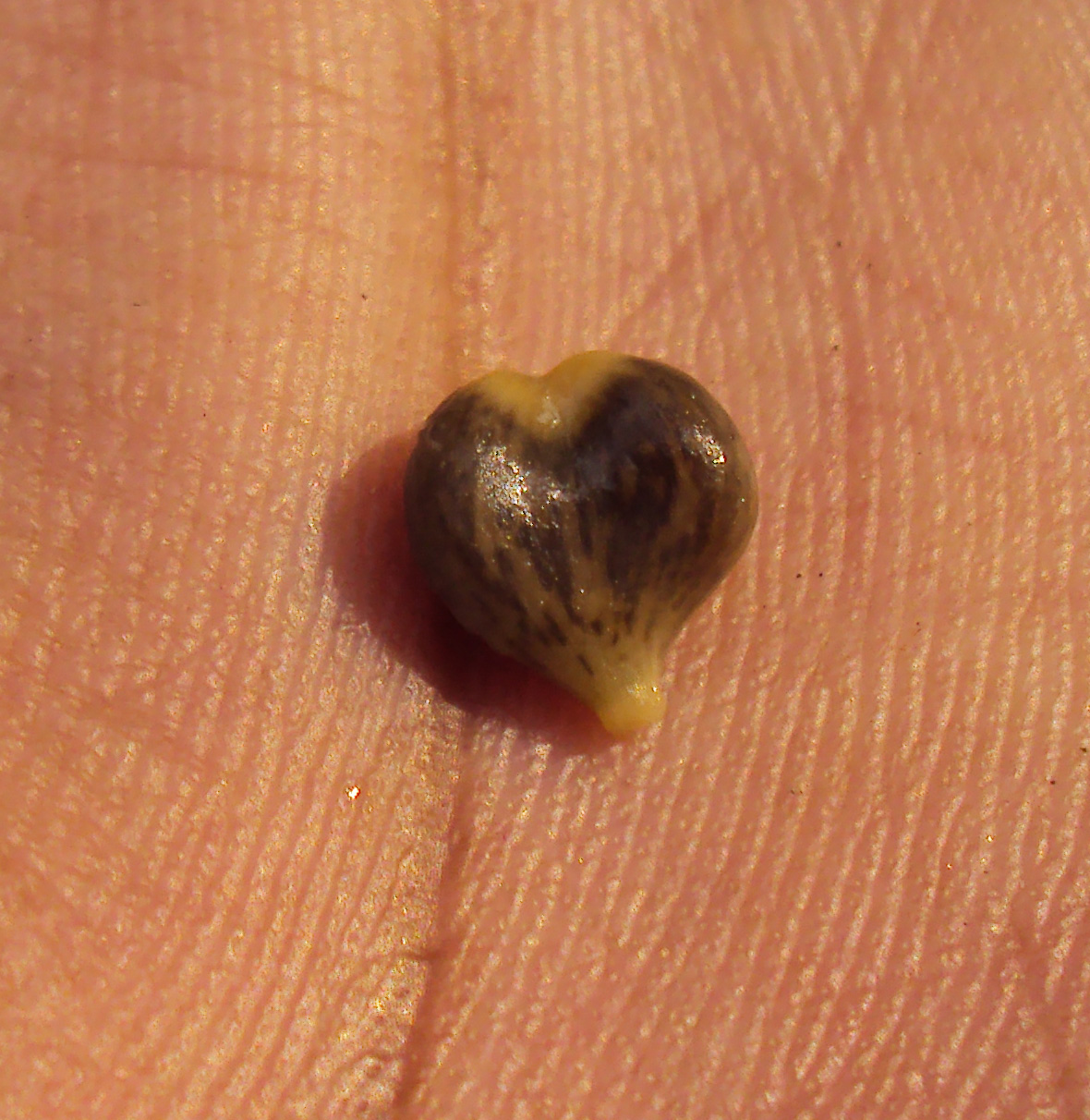
heart-shaped seed

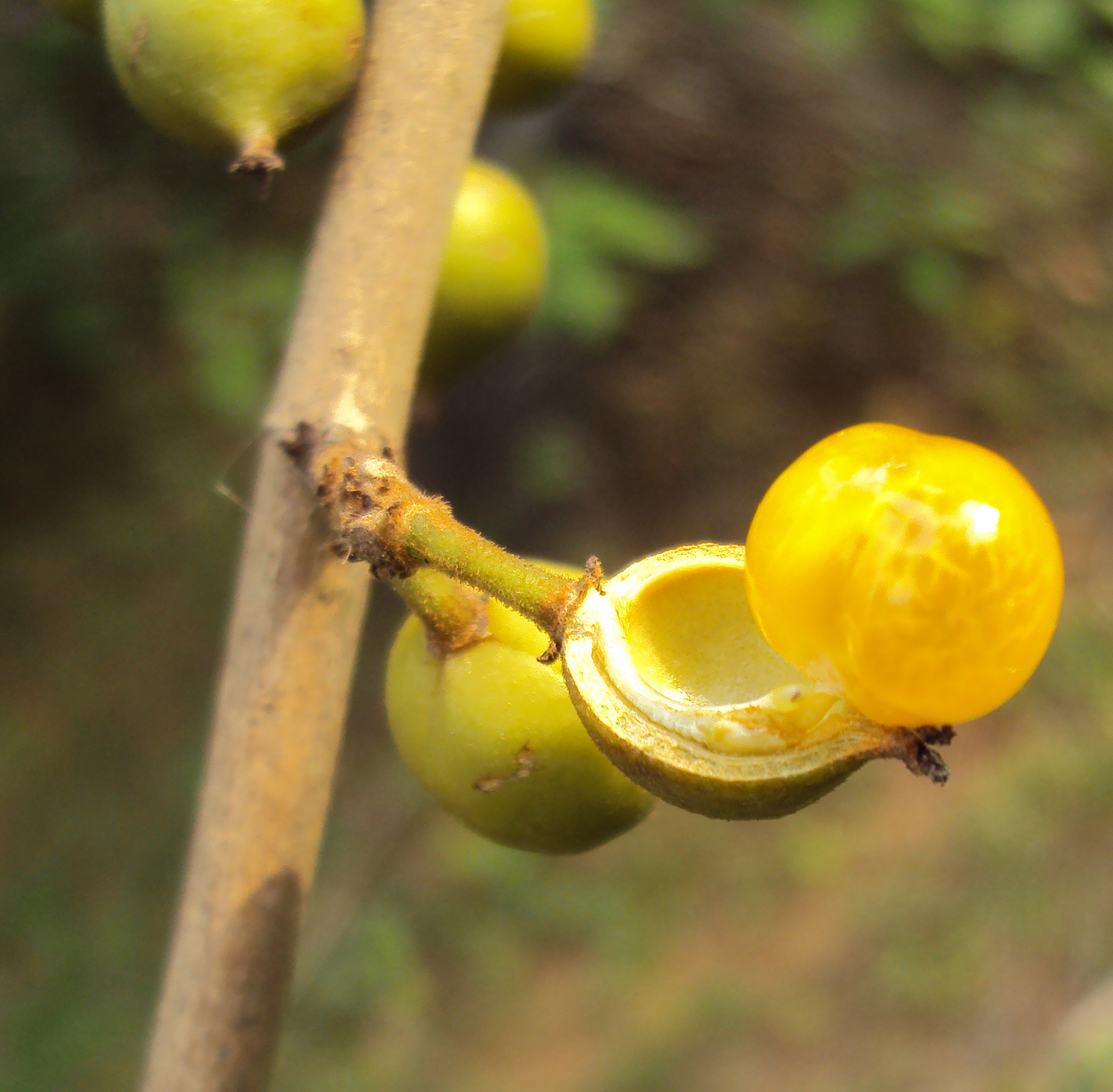
ripe fruit
