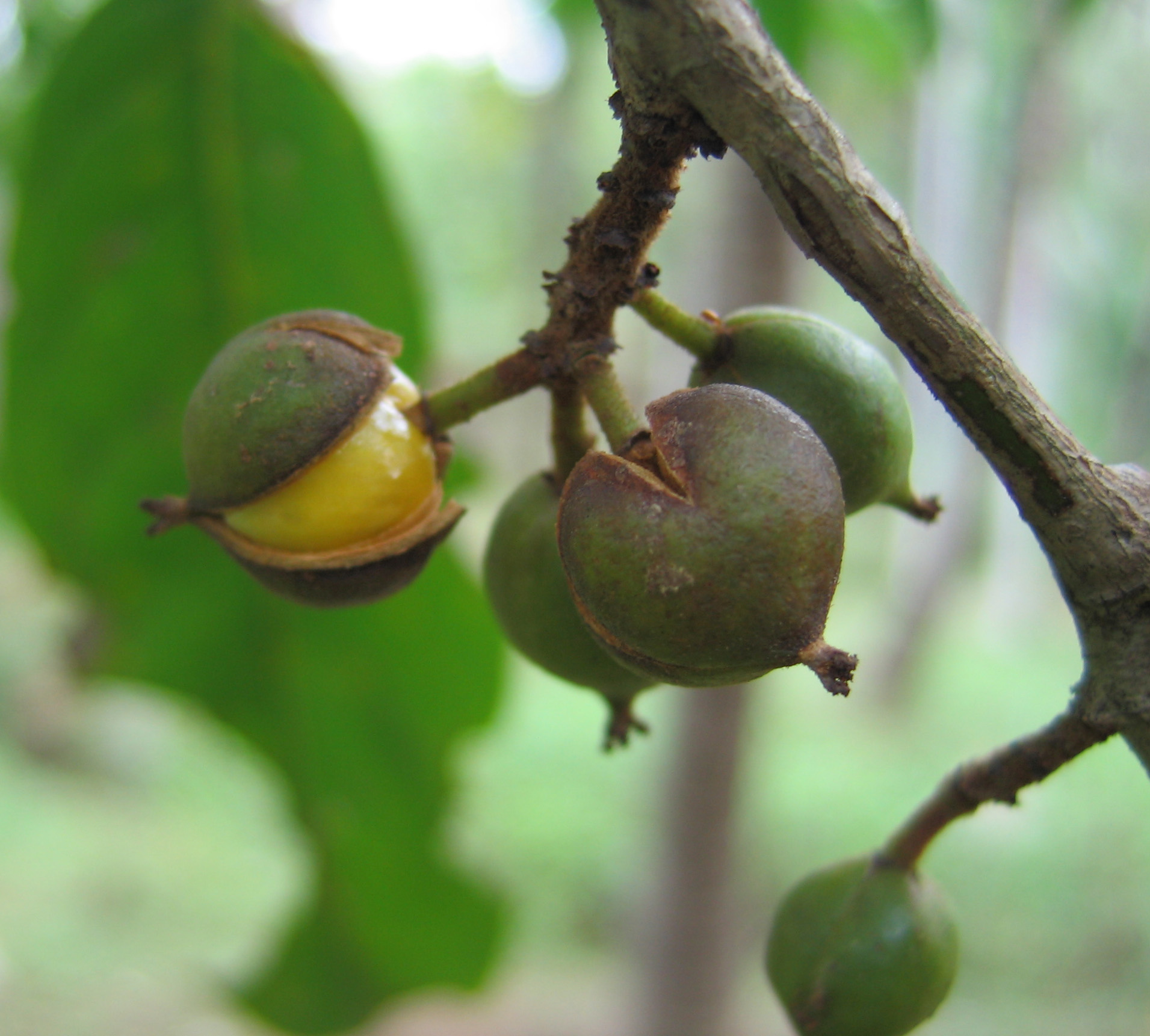
- Aporosa cardiosperma

Scientific classification
- Kingdom: Plantae
- Clade: Tracheophytes
- Clade: Angiosperms
- Clade: Eudicots
- Clade: Rosids
- Order: Malpighiales
- Family: Phyllanthaceae
- Subfamily: Antidesmatoideae
- Tribe: Scepeae
- Genus: Aporosa; Blume

Synonyms
- Aporusa Blume, spelling variant; Leiocarpus Blume; Lepidostachys Wall.; Scepa Lindl.; Tetractinostigma Hassk.

= Aporosa =

Genus of flowering plants

Aporosa is a genus of flowering plant belonging to the family Phyllanthaceae, first described as a genus in 1825. It is native to China, the Indian subcontinent, Southeast Asia, Papuasia, and Queensland.

When the genus was erected by Carl Ludwig Blume in 1825, he used the spelling Aporosa but in a publication the next year he used the spelling Aporusa and some publications and Herbert Airy Shaw in 1966 argued that the second spelling was preferred due to common usage. However, the original spelling has been preferred according to the botanical code.

These plants are mostly dioecious trees or shrubs. Four species (A. hermaphrodita, A. heterodoxa, A. brevicaudata, and A. egreria) have consistently bisexual flowers, although they may be functionally dioecious. The seeds have brightly colored arils that are attractive to birds, which disperse the seeds.

Based on fossil evidence, the genus has been hypothesized as having its origins in the Indian Subcontinent from where it may have dispersed into Southeast Asia.

There are about 80 species.

Species

1. Aporosa acuminata - SW India, Sri Lanka
2. Aporosa alia - Borneo
3. Aporosa annulata - New Guinea, Bismarcks
4. Aporosa antennifera - Borneo, Sumatra, W Malaysia
5. Aporosa arborea - Borneo, Sumatra, W Malaysia, Java, S Thailand
6. Aporosa aurea - Borneo, Sumatra, W Malaysia, S Thailand
7. Aporosa banahaensis - Philippines, Sabah
8. Aporosa basilanensis - Borneo, Basilan
9. Aporosa benthamiana - Borneo, Sumatra, W Malaysia, Philippines
10. Aporosa bourdillonii - Kerala
11. Aporosa brassii - E New Guinea, Bismarcks
12. Aporosa brevicaudata - New Guinea
13. Aporosa bullatissima - Borneo
14. Aporosa caloneura - Borneo
15. Aporosa cardiosperma - W India, Sri Lanka
16. Aporosa carrii - E New Guinea
17. Aporosa chondroneura - Borneo
18. Aporosa confusa - Borneo, Sumatra, W Malaysia
19. Aporosa decipiens - New Guinea
20. Aporosa dendroidea - Maluku
21. Aporosa duthieana - Indochina
22. Aporosa egregia - W New Guinea
23. Aporosa elmeri - Borneo
24. Aporosa falcifera - Borneo, Sumatra, W Malaysia, Sulawesi, S Thailand
25. Aporosa ficifolia - Mainland Southeast Asia
26. Aporosa flexuosa - New Guinea
27. Aporosa frutescens - Myanmar, Thailand, Malaysia, Indonesia, Philippines
28. Aporosa fulvovittata - Sabah
29. Aporosa fusiformis - SW India, Sri Lanka
30. Aporosa globifera - Sumatra, W Malaysia, S Thailand
31. Aporosa grandistipula - Borneo, Sulawesi
32. Aporosa granularis - Borneo
33. Aporosa hermaphrodita - E New Guinea
34. Aporosa heterodoxa - Bougainville I
35. Aporosa illustris - Borneo
36. Aporosa lagenocarpa - Borneo
37. Aporosa lamellata - New Guinea
38. Aporosa lanceolata - Sri Lanka
39. Aporosa latifolia - Sri Lanka
40. Aporosa laxiflora - E New Guinea, Bismarcks
41. Aporosa ledermanniana - New Guinea, Bismarcks, Louisiades
42. Aporosa leptochrysandra - New Guinea
43. Aporosa leytensis - Philippines, Sulawesi
44. Aporosa longicaudata - New Guinea
45. Aporosa lucida - Malaysia, Indonesia
46. Aporosa lunata - Borneo, Sumatra, W Malaysia, Java, S Thailand
47. Aporosa macrophylla - Myanmar
48. Aporosa maingayi - W Malaysia
49. Aporosa microstachya - W Malaysia, Java, S Thailand, S Myanmar
50. Aporosa misimana - E New Guinea
51. Aporosa nervosa - Borneo, Sumatra, W Malaysia, S Thailand
52. Aporosa nigricans - Borneo, Sumatra, W Malaysia, S Thailand
53. Aporosa nigropunctata - New Guinea
54. Aporosa nitida - Borneo
55. Aporosa octandra - S China, SE Asia, New Guinea, Queensland
56. Aporosa papuana - New Guinea, Bismarcks, Solomons
57. Aporosa parvula - W New Guinea
58. Aporosa penangensis - W Malaysia, S Thailand
59. Aporosa planchoniana - Mainland Southeast Asia
60. Aporosa praegrandifolia - New Guinea
61. Aporosa prainiana - Borneo, Sumatra, W Malaysia
62. Aporosa pseudoficifolia - W Malaysia, S Thailand, S Myanmar
63. Aporosa quadrilocularis - Kedah, Sumatra
64. Aporosa reticulata - E New Guinea
65. Aporosa rhacostyla - Sarawak
66. Aporosa sarawakensis - Borneo
67. Aporosa sclerophylla - E New Guinea
68. Aporosa selangorica - W Malaysia
69. Aporosa serrata - Laos, N Thailand
70. Aporosa sphaeridiophora - Philippines, Java
71. Aporosa stellifera - Sumatra, W Malaysia, S Thailand
72. Aporosa stenostachys - Sarawak
73. Aporosa subcaudata - Borneo, Sumatra, W Malaysia
74. Aporosa sylvestri - Sarawak
75. Aporosa symplocifolia - Philippines
76. Aporosa symplocoides - Borneo, Sumatra, W Malaysia, S Thailand
77. Aporosa tetrapleura - Cambodia, Vietnam
78. Aporosa vagans - New Guinea to Admiralty Is
79. Aporosa villosa - Southeast Asia, Andaman & Nicobar
80. Aporosa wallichii - Assam, Bangladesh, Indochina
81. Aporosa whitmorei - Sumatra, W Malaysia
82. Aporosa yunnanensis - Indochina, S China, Assam

formerly included

moved to other genera: Antidesma Baccaurea Drypetes Shirakiopsis

1. A. bilitonensis - Baccaurea minor
2. A. calocarpa - Drypetes longifolia
3. A. dolichocarpa - Baccaurea javanica
4. A. griffithii - Antidesma coriaceum
5. A. inaequalis - Drypetes leonensis
6. A. somalensis - Shirakiopsis elliptica
