= Aporosa planchoniana =

Scientific classification
- Kingdom: Plantae
- Clade: Tracheophytes
- Clade: Angiosperms
- Clade: Eudicots
- Clade: Rosids
- Order: Malpighiales
- Family: Phyllanthaceae
- Genus: Aporosa
- Species: A. planchoniana

Binomial name
- Aporosa planchoniana Baill. ex Müll.Arg.

Synonyms
- Lepidostachys parviflora Planch. ex Baill.

Species of flowering plant

Aporosa planchoniana is a species of shrub in the family Phyllanthaceae.

== Taxonomy ==
A. planchoniana is in a clade with sisters Aporosa ficifolia, A. octandra, A. tetrapleura, and A. villosa, separated from other species within the Appendiculatae section of the Aporosa genus.

== Description ==
The species grows 2-4m tall, occurring in open forests. It is found in Thailand, Myanmar, Cambodia, Laos, and Vietnam. It has been erroneously recorded as occurring in South-Central and Southeast Zhōngguó/China, including Hainan. At Khao Yai National Park, central Thailand, the orange dehiscent fruit grow some 9mm long, 7 mm in diameter and weighing just 0.3g. There is one seed per fruit, weighing 0.05g, 6mm long and 4mm in diameter. The fruit has been observed to be consumed by Bulbuls and squirrels (Callosciurus finlaysonii and Ratufa bicolor).

Like other species in the Appendiculatae section of the Aporosa genus, this species has: glands that are basal and adaxial; disc-like glands scattered unevenly within arches of marginal veins throughout the abaxial surface of the leaf/lamina; stigma that are papillate; and the ovary has pubescent septae and column.

== Distribution and habitat ==
The shrub grows on the leeward side of the Bang Boet coastal sand dune, Pak Klong sub-district, Pathio District, Chumphon Province, southern Thailand (facing east into the Gulf of Thailand.

== Vernacular names ==
Common names include miën préi (="wild longan", Khmer) and propech chongva (Kuy/Khmer).

== Utilization ==
The fruit is edible and the stems are used as firewood. Amongst Kuy- and Khmer-speaking people living in the same villages in Stung Treng and Preah Vihear provinces of north-central Cambodia, the small tree is used as source of medicine.
