= Prismatomeris borneensis =

Scientific classification
- Kingdom: Plantae
- Clade: Embryophytes
- Clade: Tracheophytes
- Clade: Spermatophytes
- Clade: Angiosperms
- Clade: Eudicots
- Clade: Asterids
- Order: Gentianales
- Family: Rubiaceae
- Genus: Prismatomeris
- Species: P. borneensis

Binomial name
- Prismatomeris borneensis (J.T.Johanss.) Razafim. & Rydin (2020)

Synonyms
- Motleyia borneensis J.T.Johanss. (1987)

Species of plants

Prismatomeris borneensis is a species of flowering plant belonging to the family Rubiaceae. It is a tree native to northern Sarawak and southwestern Sabah states of Malaysia on the island of Borneo.

It was first named Motleyia borneensis and placed in the monotypic genus Motleyia. Both the genus and species were first described and published in Blumea Vol.32 on pages 149–150 in 1987. It was placed in genus Prismatomeris in 2020. The genus name Motleyia is in honour of James Motley (1822–1859), a Yorkshireman closely associated with South Wales and Borneo. The Latin specific epithet of borneensis means "coming from Borneo".
