= Prismatomeris brachypus =

Conservation status
- Near Threatened (IUCN 3.1)

Scientific classification
- Kingdom: Plantae
- Clade: Tracheophytes
- Clade: Angiosperms
- Clade: Eudicots
- Clade: Asterids
- Order: Gentianales
- Family: Rubiaceae
- Genus: Prismatomeris
- Species: P. brachypus

Binomial name
- Prismatomeris brachypus Ridl.

Species of flowering plant

Prismatomeris brachypus is a species of flowering plant in the family Rubiaceae. It is a tree native to the Philippines. The species was described in 1940, and is listed as Near Threatened by the IUCN.

== Taxonomy ==
The species was described by Henry Nicholas Ridley in 1940.

== Distribution ==
Prismatomeris brachypus is native to the wet tropical biome of the eastern Philippines. It is found in Cagayan, Camarines Norte, Camarines Sur, Isabela, Quezon, Biliran, Samar, Agusan del Norte, Surigao del Norte, and Surigao del Sur. Its extent of occurrence is over 156,116.342 square kilometres (60,276.857 sq mi).

The species grows at elevations of 150–725 metres (492–2,379 ft).

== Description ==
Prismatomeris brachypus is a tree. It grows to around 10 metres (33 ft) high. It is thought to flower in February, April, May, June, October and December, and is thought to fruit from April to July.

== Conservation ==
In 2020, the IUCN assessed Prismatomeris brachypus as Near Threatened. It is threatened by shifting agriculture, deforestation, and urbanisation. The species is not legally protected against extraction from the wild.

Prismatomeris brachypus is present in protected areas, including Northern Sierra Madre Natural Park, Bicol Natural Park, and Samar Island Natural Park, and in Key Biodiversity Areas.
