= Prismatomeris javanica =

Scientific classification
- Kingdom: Plantae
- Clade: Embryophytes
- Clade: Tracheophytes
- Clade: Spermatophytes
- Clade: Angiosperms
- Clade: Eudicots
- Clade: Asterids
- Order: Gentianales
- Family: Rubiaceae
- Genus: Prismatomeris
- Species: P. javanica

Binomial name
- Prismatomeris javanica (Valeton) Ridl.

Synonyms
- Prismatomeris albiflora var. javanica Valeton

Species of flowering plant

Prismatomeris javanica is a species of flowering plant in the family Rubiaceae. It is a shrub native to Indonesia. It was described in 1902, and recognised as a species in 1940.

== Taxonomy ==
The species was described in 1902, as a subspecies of Prismatomeris albiflora, by Theodoric Valeton. In 1940, Henry Nicholas Ridley described P. javanica as a species, in the Kew Bulletin of Miscellaneous Information.

== Distribution ==
Prismatomeris javanica is native to the wet tropical biome of Indonesia. It is present in northern and western Sumatra, and western Java.
