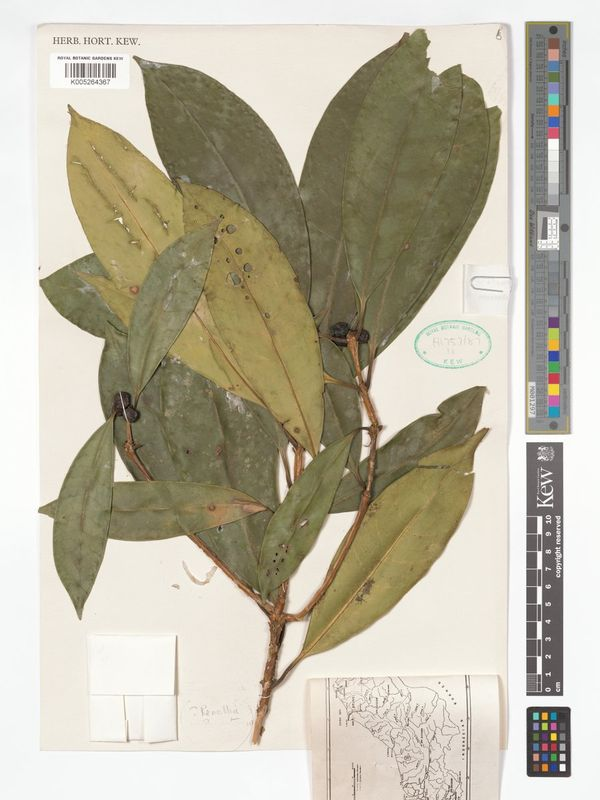

Conservation status
- Near Threatened (IUCN 3.1)

Scientific classification
- Kingdom: Plantae
- Clade: Embryophytes
- Clade: Tracheophytes
- Clade: Spermatophytes
- Clade: Angiosperms
- Clade: Eudicots
- Clade: Asterids
- Order: Gentianales
- Family: Rubiaceae
- Genus: Prismatomeris
- Species: P. robusta

Binomial name
- Prismatomeris robusta J.T.Johanss.

= Prismatomeris robusta =

Species of flowering plant

Prismatomeris robusta is a species of flowering plant in the family Rubiaceae. It is a shrub or tree native to Borneo. The species was described in 1987, and is listed as Near Threatened by the IUCN.

== Taxonomy ==
The species was described by Jan Thomas Johansson in 1987.

== Distribution ==
Prismatomeris robusta is native to the wet tropical biome of Borneo (Sabah and Sarawak). It may be present in Sumatra, where it has been found in one location. Its extent of occurrence is 580,568 square kilometres (224,159 sq mi).

The species grows in mixed dipterocarp forests, sandstone forests, and lower montane forests.

== Description ==
Prismatomeris robusta is a shrub or tree.

== Conservation ==
In 2023, the IUCN assessed Prismatomeris robusta as Near Threatened. It is threatened by land use change, agriculture, and urbanisation. The species is present in protected areas.
