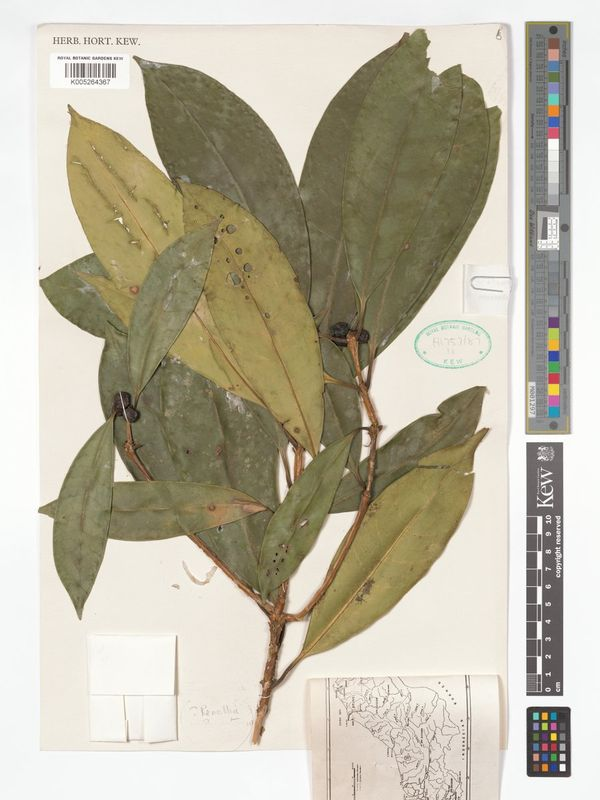
- Prismatomeris robusta

Scientific classification
- Kingdom: Plantae
- Clade: Embryophytes
- Clade: Tracheophytes
- Clade: Spermatophytes
- Clade: Angiosperms
- Clade: Eudicots
- Clade: Asterids
- Order: Gentianales
- Family: Rubiaceae
- Subfamily: Rubioideae
- Tribe: Prismatomerideae
- Genus: Prismatomeris; Thwaites (1856)

Species
- 17; see text

Synonyms
- Motleyia J.T.Johanss. (1987); Zeuxanthe Ridl. (1940)

= Prismatomeris =

Genus of plants

Prismatomeris is a genus of plant in the family Rubiaceae. It includes 17 species native to the Indian subcontinent, Indochina, southern China, and western Malesia. The genus Prismatomeris was described by George Henry Kendrick Thwaites and is currently recognized as a valid genus by major botanical authorities. Its taxonomic status and species circumscription are maintained by Plants of the World Online (POWO), which lists the genus as part of the family Rubiaceae.

- Prismatomeris albidiflora Thwaites
- Prismatomeris beccariana (Baill. ex K.Schum.) J.T.Johanss.
- Prismatomeris borneensis (J.T.Johanss.) Razafim. & Rydin
- Prismatomeris brachypus Ridl.
- Prismatomeris filamentosa Craib
- Prismatomeris fragrans E.T.Geddes
- Prismatomeris glabra (Korth.) Valeton
- Prismatomeris griffithii Ridl.
- Prismatomeris javanica (Valeton) Ridl.
- Prismatomeris khoonmengiana Y.W.Low
- Prismatomeris kinabaluensis J.T.Johanss.
- Prismatomeris memecyloides Craib
- Prismatomeris mollis Craib
- Prismatomeris obtusifolia Merr.
- Prismatomeris robusta J.T.Johanss.
- Prismatomeris sessiliflora Pierre ex Pit.
- Prismatomeris tetrandra (Roxb.) K.Schum.
