= Aporosa ficifolia =

Scientific classification
- Kingdom: Plantae
- Clade: Embryophytes
- Clade: Tracheophytes
- Clade: Angiosperms
- Clade: Eudicots
- Clade: Rosids
- Order: Malpighiales
- Family: Phyllanthaceae
- Genus: Aporosa
- Species: A. ficifolia

Binomial name
- Aporosa ficifolia Baill., Adansonia 11: 177 (1874)

Species of plant from Thailand, Cambodia and Vietnam

Aporosa ficifolia is a species of shrub in the family Phyllanthaceae. It grows 2–8 m (6.6–26.2 ft) tall, it has a restricted habitat, growing in lowland open or pine forests up to 700 m (2,300 ft) elevation.

== Taxonomy ==
A. ficifolia is in a clade with sisters Aporosa octandra, A. planchoniana, A. tetrapleura, and A. villosa, separated from other species within the Appendiculatae section of the Aporosa genus.

== Description ==
Like other species in the Appendiculatae section of the Aporosa genus, this species has: glands that are basal and adaxial; disc-like glands scattered unevenly within arches of marginal veins throughout the abaxial surface of the leaf/lamina; stigma that are papillate; and the ovary has pubescent septae and column.

== Distribution ==
It is found in Thailand, Cambodia and Vietnam. It has been erroneously recorded as occurring in Malaysia and Myanmar.

== Habitat ==
Occurring in the Dry Dipterocarp Forest of Huai Kha Khaeng Wildlife Sanctuary, west-central Thailand, it is found in sites which have experienced a full range of burning frequencies, that is, it is found in places that have been frequently, infrequently and rarely burnt as well as unburnt. However, they are most common in sites where fire is infrequent or rare. It is noted that A. ficifolia has adaption traits to the presence of fire: thick bark, and re-sprouting capacity following damage to the stem.

In Kirirom National Park, southeastern Cambodia, there is the largest stand of Pinus latteri forest in Cambodia. The pine provides some 50% of the 8-2 m canopy, growing at elevation from 400 to 1,000 m (1,300 to 3,300 ft). Amongst the woody taxa in the understorey is A. ficifolia.

In Choam Takong (choam="permanently inundated evergreen swamp forest", Khmer), Stung Treng Province, northeastern Cambodia, the shrub is infrequently found in both permanently and seasonally inundated areas of a unique evergreen freshwater swamp forest formation, with a canopy dominated by Eugenia, Ficus, and Litsea species, Macaranga triloba, Myristica iners, Pternandra caerulescens, and Livistona saribus.

== Vernacular names ==
Common names include kru:ng, kru:ng krâhâ:m, kru:ng viël, kruong (Khmer), krong (Kuy/Khmer), and ngăm lông dày (Vietnamese)

== Uses ==
The branches make excellent firewood, and the roots are used in Cambodian local medicine to treat sexual diseases. Amongst villagers living around the Bung Khong Long Non-Hunting Area, of Bueng Khong Long District, northeastern Thailand, the young leaves are eaten as fresh vegetables in March and April, and the ripe fruits are eaten from April to November.

Amongst Kuy- and Khmer-speaking people living in the same villages in Stung Treng and Preah Vihear provinces of north-central Cambodia, the small tree is used as source of medicine.
