= Aporosa fusiformis =

Conservation status
- Critically Endangered (IUCN 2.3)

Scientific classification
- Kingdom: Plantae
- Clade: Tracheophytes
- Clade: Angiosperms
- Clade: Eudicots
- Clade: Rosids
- Order: Malpighiales
- Family: Phyllanthaceae
- Genus: Aporosa
- Species: A. fusiformis

Binomial name
- Aporosa fusiformis Thw.

Species of flowering plant

Aporosa fusiformis is a species of plant in the family Phyllanthaceae. It is endemic to Sri Lanka.
