= Aporosa maingayi =

Conservation status
- Near Threatened (IUCN 2.3)

Scientific classification
- Kingdom: Plantae
- Clade: Tracheophytes
- Clade: Angiosperms
- Clade: Eudicots
- Clade: Rosids
- Order: Malpighiales
- Family: Phyllanthaceae
- Genus: Aporosa
- Species: A. maingayi

Binomial name
- Aporosa maingayi Hook.f.

Synonyms
- Aporosa isabellina Airy Shaw

Species of flowering plant

Aporosa maingayi, synonym Aporosa isabellina, is a species of flowering plant in the family Phyllanthaceae. It is endemic to Peninsular Malaysia. It was first described by Joseph Dalton Hooker in 1887.
