= Aporosa tetrapleura =

Scientific classification
- Kingdom: Plantae
- Clade: Embryophytes
- Clade: Tracheophytes
- Clade: Angiosperms
- Clade: Eudicots
- Clade: Rosids
- Order: Malpighiales
- Family: Phyllanthaceae
- Genus: Aporosa
- Species: A. tetrapleura

Binomial name
- Aporosa tetrapleura Hance

Synonyms
- none

Species of tree from Cambodia and Vietnam

Aporosa tetrapleura is a species of plant in the family Phyllanthaceae found in Cambodia and Vietnam. The wood is used in house and cattle barn construction and as firewood.

== Taxonomy and history ==
A. tetrapleura is in a clade with sisters Aporosa ficifolia, A. octandra, A. planchoniana, and A. villosa, separated from other species within the Appendiculatae section of the Aporosa genus.

The species was first described by Henry Fletcher Hance (1827–1886), an English diplomat and botanist, who worked in Zhōngguó/China from 1844 to his death. He published the description in 1876 in the Journal of Botany, British and Foreign.

== Description ==
A. tetrapleura is a tree, usually small, but up to 12 m (39 ft) in height, with a trunk some 10 cm (3.9 in) in diameter The petioles are some 9 to 21 mm long. The leaves have large black basal glands; a (narrowly) elliptic leather and shiny blade, which when dry is often rather brittle; an acute to acuminate apex; and 6 to 8 pairs of nerves. Inflorescences occur axillary or just below the leaves. Laxly set flowers with 4 sepals and 2 stamens in the staminate flowers. The fruit are 11 to 14 mm long, they are not stiped, and only the immature fruit are beaked, at the sutures there is ridging; the pericarp is 0.5-1.55 mm thick. Flowering occurs in April and December, fruiting in March and June.

== Distribution ==
The species is found in Cambodia and in south and central Vietnam.

== Habitat and ecology ==
The tree occurs in forests, favouring granitic soils at about 300 m (980 ft) altitude.

The primary forest adjacent to Khe Tran village (Phong Mỹ commune, Thừa Thiên Huế Province, central Vietnam) have Adinandra cf. hainanensis (Theaceae), A. tetrapleura and Aporosa octandra as the most abundant species.

== Vernacular names ==
A long mom pu xá, a long môt, mom are names used by Pahy and Vietnamese language speakers at Khe Tran village, Vietnam.

== Use ==
Large trees of this species from primary provides timber for house and light (cattle barn) construction, and wood for firewood in the Khe Tran village, Vietnam. Smaller trees from secondary forest provide firewood and light (cattle barn) construction timber
