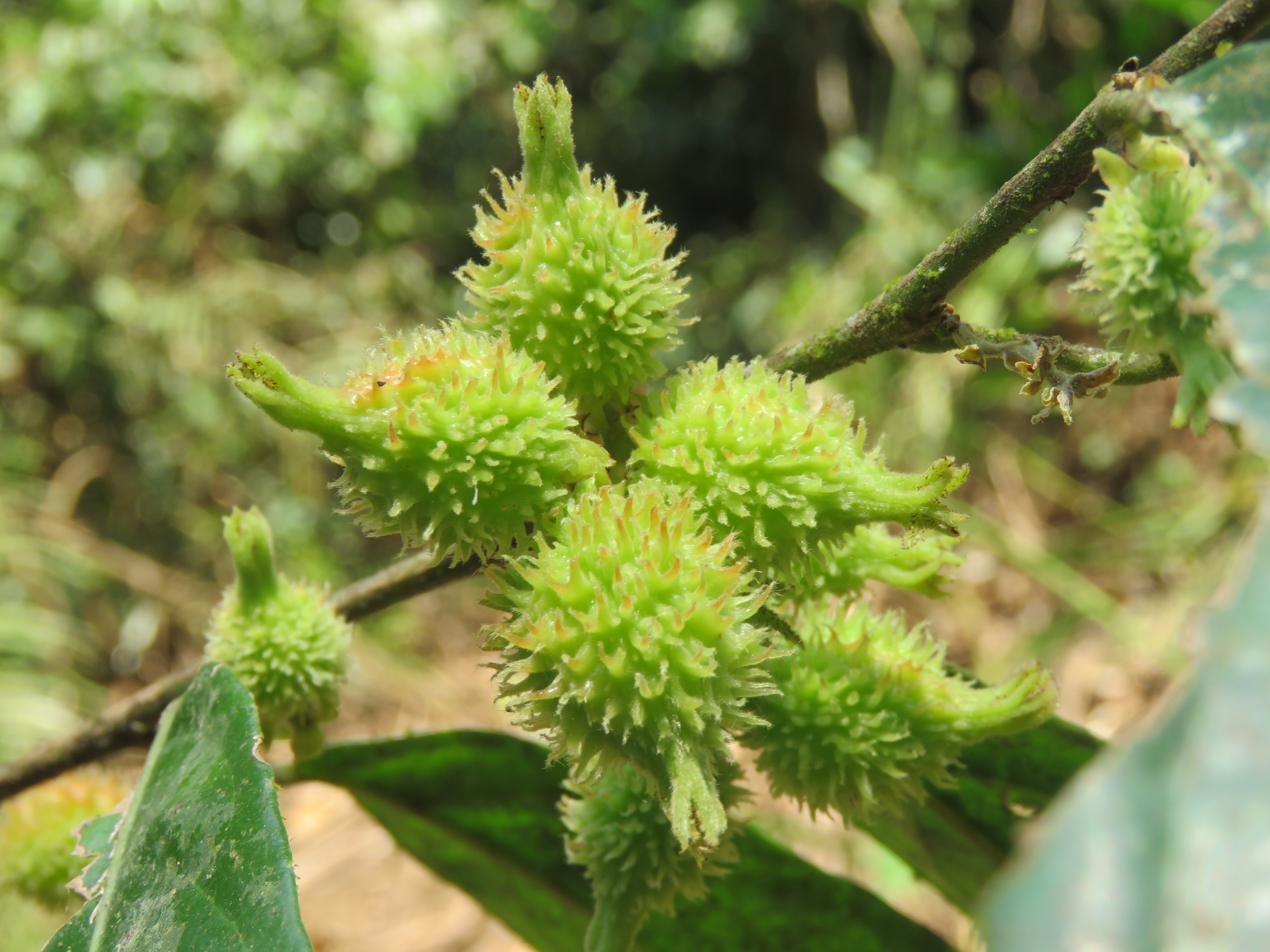
- At Thattekkaadu

Conservation status
- Endangered (IUCN 3.1)

Scientific classification
- Kingdom: Plantae
- Clade: Tracheophytes
- Clade: Angiosperms
- Clade: Eudicots
- Clade: Rosids
- Order: Malpighiales
- Family: Phyllanthaceae
- Genus: Aporosa
- Species: A. bourdillonii

Binomial name
- Aporosa bourdillonii Stapf.

= Aporosa bourdillonii =

Species of flowering plant

Aporosa bourdillonii is a species of plant in the family Phyllanthaceae. It is endemic to the southern Western Ghats of Kerala in southern India. It grows in lowland evergreen and semi-evergreen forest from 50 to 600 metres elevation.
