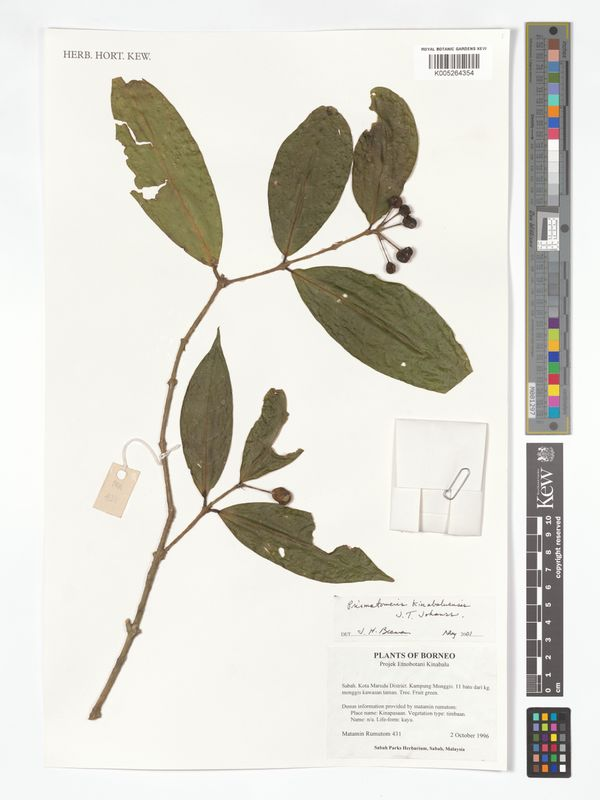

Conservation status
- Least Concern (IUCN 3.1)

Scientific classification
- Kingdom: Plantae
- Clade: Embryophytes
- Clade: Tracheophytes
- Clade: Spermatophytes
- Clade: Angiosperms
- Clade: Eudicots
- Clade: Asterids
- Order: Gentianales
- Family: Rubiaceae
- Genus: Prismatomeris
- Species: P. kinabaluensis

Binomial name
- Prismatomeris kinabaluensis J.T.Johanss.

= Prismatomeris kinabaluensis =

Species of flowering plant

Prismatomeris kinabaluensis is a species of flowering plant in the family Rubiaceae. It is a shrub or small tree native to Sabah, Borneo. The species was described in 1987, and has been assessed as Least Concern by the IUCN.

== Taxonomy ==
The species was described in 1987, by Jan Thomas Johansson.

== Distribution ==
Prismatomeris kinabaluensis is endemic to the wet tropical biome of Sabah, Borneo. The species' estimated extent of occurrence is around 1,021 square kilometres (394 sq mi). It grows at elevations of 600–1,700 metres (2,000–5,600 ft).

Prismatomeris kinabaluensis grows in hill and lower montane forests, and sometimes on ultramafic substrates.

== Description ==
Prismatomeris kinabaluensis is a shrub or small tree that grows up to 10 metres (33 ft) high.

== Conservation ==
In 2020, the IUCN assessed Prismatomeris kinabaluensis as of Least Concern. The species faces no major threats, and is found in at least three protected areas, though some of its area of occupancy has been lost to land-use changes.
