= Prismatomeris fragrans =

Scientific classification
- Kingdom: Plantae
- Clade: Embryophytes
- Clade: Tracheophytes
- Clade: Angiosperms
- Clade: Eudicots
- Clade: Asterids
- Order: Gentianales
- Family: Rubiaceae
- Genus: Prismatomeris
- Species: P. fragrans

Binomial name
- Prismatomeris fragrans E.T.Geddes

Synonyms
- none (though see subsp.)

Species of tree

Prismatomeris fragrans

Scientific classification
- Kingdom: Plantae
- Clade: Embryophytes
- Clade: Tracheophytes
- Clade: Angiosperms
- Clade: Eudicots
- Clade: Asterids
- Order: Gentianales
- Family: Rubiaceae
- Genus: Prismatomeris
- Species: P. fragrans
- Variety: P. f. var. andamanica

Trinomial name
- Prismatomeris fragrans var. andamanica (Ridl.) J.T.Johanss.

Synonyms
- Prismatomeris andamanica Ridl.

Prismatomeris fragrans is a species of tree in the Rubiaceae family. It is found in Southeast Asia. The subspecies Prismatomeris fragrans subsp. andamanica is found only on the Andaman Islands.

== Taxonomy ==
There is are two accepted subspecies, the autonym Prismatomeris fragrans subsp. fragrans and Prismatomeris fragrans subsp. andamanica.

== Distribution ==
It is native to Southeast Asia. Countries and regions in which it grows are: Vietnam; Laos; Thailand; and the Andaman Islands, India. The autonym subspecies is limited to the mainland Southeast Asia, while the andamanica subspecies is endemic to the Andaman Islands.
