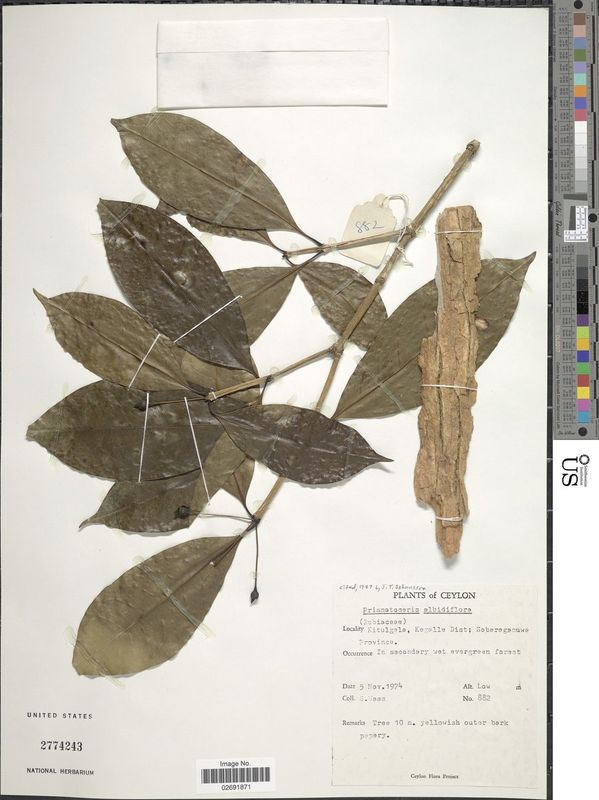

Scientific classification
- Kingdom: Plantae
- Clade: Embryophytes
- Clade: Tracheophytes
- Clade: Angiosperms
- Clade: Eudicots
- Clade: Asterids
- Order: Gentianales
- Family: Rubiaceae
- Genus: Prismatomeris
- Species: P. albidiflora

Binomial name
- Prismatomeris albidiflora Thwaites

= Prismatomeris albidiflora =

Species of flowering plant

Prismatomeris albidiflora is a species of flowering plant in the family Rubiaceae. It is a shrub or tree native to Sri Lanka, that was described in 1856.

== Taxonomy ==
The species was described by George Henry Kendrick Thwaites in 1856.

== Distribution ==
Prismatomeris albidiflora is native to the wet tropical biome of south-west Sri Lanka.

== Description ==
Prismatomeris albidiflora is a shrub or tree.
