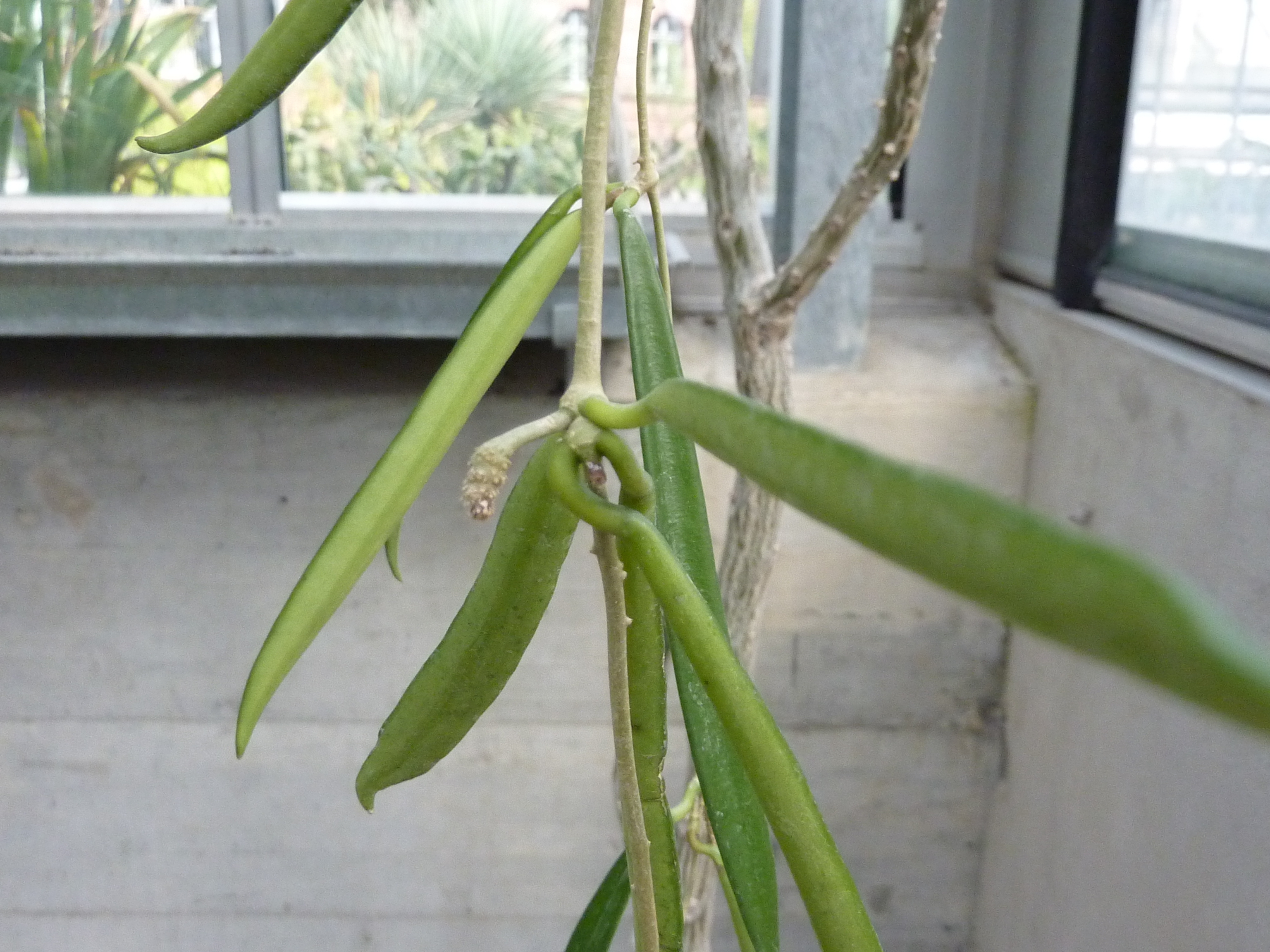
- Hoya longifolia at the Botanical Garden of the University of Basel, 2010

Scientific classification
- Kingdom: Plantae
- Clade: Tracheophytes
- Clade: Angiosperms
- Clade: Eudicots
- Clade: Asterids
- Order: Gentianales
- Family: Apocynaceae
- Genus: Hoya
- Species: H. longifolia

Binomial name
- Hoya longifolia Wall. ex Wight

= Hoya longifolia =

Species of plant

Hoya longifolia is a species of Hoya native to tropical Asia, from the Himalaya region through China (Yunnan) to Thailand.

== See also ==
- List of Hoya species
