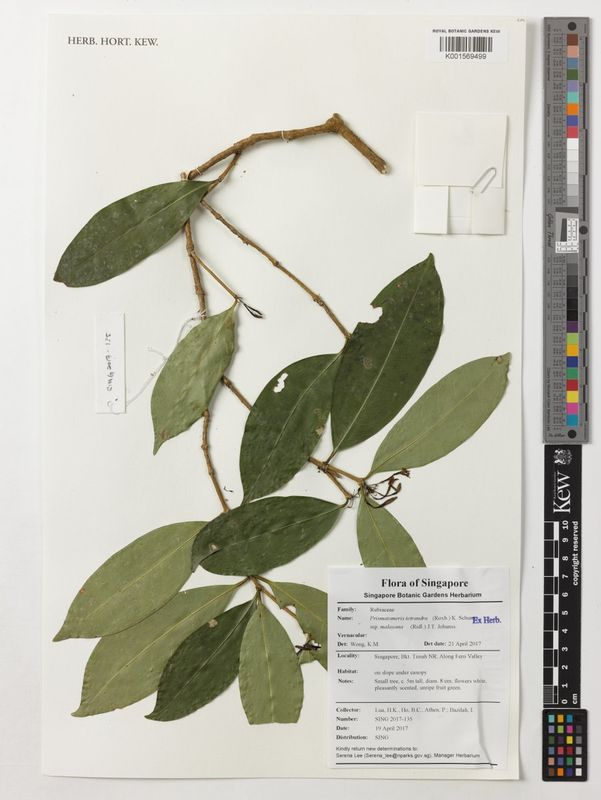
- Prismatomeris tetrandra subsp. malayana

Conservation status
- Least Concern (IUCN 3.1)

Scientific classification
- Kingdom: Plantae
- Clade: Embryophytes
- Clade: Tracheophytes
- Clade: Angiosperms
- Clade: Eudicots
- Clade: Asterids
- Order: Gentianales
- Family: Rubiaceae
- Genus: Prismatomeris
- Species: P. tetrandra

Binomial name
- Prismatomeris tetrandra (Roxb.) K.Schum.

Subspecies
- Prismatomeris tetrandra subsp. malayana (Ridl.) J.T.Johanss.; Prismatomeris tetrandra subsp. tetrandra

Synonyms
- Coffea tetrandra Roxb.

= Prismatomeris tetrandra =

Species of flowering plant

Prismatomeris tetrandra is a species of flowering plant in the family Rubiaceae. It is a shrub or tree with leathery or papery leaves, white or pale purple flowers, and ovoid drupes. The species is native to a large region of south and south-east Asia.

Prismatomeris tetrandra was described in 1824, and is listed as of Least Concern by the IUCN.

== Taxonomy ==
In 1824, William Roxburgh described Prismatomeris tetrandra, placing it in the genus Coffea. In 1891, Karl Moritz Schumann placed it in the genus Prismatomeris.

Two subspecies are recognised:

- Prismatomeris tetrandra subsp. malayana (Ridl.) J.T.Johanss.
- Prismatomeris tetrandra subsp. tetrandra

== Distribution ==
Prismatomeris tetrandra is native to the wet tropical biome of Bangladesh, Borneo (Sabah and Kalimantan), Cambodia, China (Fujian, Guangdong, Guangxi, Hainan, and southern Yunnan), India (the Andaman Islands and Assam), Peninsular Malaysia, Myanmar, the Philippines, Sri Lanka, Thailand, and Vietnam. Its extent of occurrence is at least 9,519,590 square kilometres (3,675,530 sq mi).

The species grows in forests and thickets, at elevations of 300–2,400 metres (980–7,870 ft).

== Description ==
Prismatomeris tetrandra is a shrub or small tree. It grows up to 8 metres (26 ft) high. The branches are tetrangular to subcylindrical.

The leaf stems are 4–15 millimetres (0.16–0.59 in) long. The leaves are lanceolate, elliptic, oblong, ovate, or obovate, 4–18 centimetres (1.6–7.1 in) long, and 2–6 centimetres (0.79–2.36 in) wide. When dry, the leaves are leathery, or stiffly papery and shiny.

The inflorescence is a fascicle or umbel, measuring 5–35 millimetres (0.20–1.38 in) long. When present, the flower stems are 5–15 millimetres (0.20–0.59 in) long. The hypanthium is hemispherical. The corolla is a white or pale purple tube, measuring 14–20 millimetres (0.55–0.79 in) long. The corolla has four or five lobes, which are lanceolate, and 7–10 millimetres (0.28–0.39 in) long. The plant flowers from May to September.

The fruit is a smooth, subglobose drupe measuring 8–12 millimetres (0.31–0.47 in) wide. The plant fruits from September to December.

== Conservation ==
In 2023, the IUCN assessed Prismatomeris tetrandra as of Least Concern. Some subpopulations are threatened by urban development. The species occurs in protected areas.

== Nomenclature ==
In Chinese, Prismatomeris tetrandra is known as 四蕊三角瓣花 (si rui san jiao ban hua).
