= Quercus helferiana =

Conservation status
- Least Concern (IUCN 3.1)

Scientific classification
- Kingdom: Plantae
- Clade: Embryophytes
- Clade: Tracheophytes
- Clade: Spermatophytes
- Clade: Angiosperms
- Clade: Eudicots
- Clade: Rosids
- Order: Fagales
- Family: Fagaceae
- Genus: Quercus
- Subgenus: Quercus subg. Cerris
- Section: Quercus sect. Cyclobalanopsis
- Species: Q. helferiana

Binomial name
- Quercus helferiana A.DC. 1864

Synonyms
- Cyclobalanopsis helferiana (A.DC.) Oerst.; Quercus ilex Lour., nom. illeg. homonym. post.; Quercus prainiana H.Lév. 1913 not Trel. 1924

Species of tree

Quercus helferiana is a species of tree in the beech family Fagaceae. It is native to Vietnam, Thailand, Laos, Myanmar, India (northeast), and southern China (Yunnan, Guangdong, Guangxi, Guizhou). It is placed in subgenus Cerris, section Cyclobalanopsis.

== Description ==
Quercus helferiana is a tree up to 20 m. tall, with a trunk up to 0.3 m in diameter. Leaves oblong-elliptic, to elliptic-lanceolate, 120-150 (up to 220) × 40-80 (up to 95) mm, with wavy edges but no teeth or lobes. The acorn is oblate, 10-16 × 15–22 mm, grey, with a depressed apex and often covered with shaggy hairs; the scar is 12–14 mm in diameter, flat to concave at maturity. Flowering is in March–April, acorns found from October–November.
