= William Grant Craib =

British botanist (1882–1933)

William Grant Craib FLS FRSE (10 March 1882 in Banff, Aberdeenshire – 1 September 1933 in Kew) was a British botanist. Craib was Regius Professor of Botany at the University of Aberdeen and later worked at the Royal Botanic Gardens, Kew. The standard author abbreviation Craib is used to indicate this person as the author when citing a botanical name.

== Life ==
Craib was born in Banff, Aberdeenshire in northern Scotland on 10 March 1882 and he was educated at Banff Academy and Fordyce Academy. He entered Aberdeen University as an Art student but due to problems with his eyes he left and worked for a while on a ship as an engineer. When his eyes were better, he returned to Aberdeen University and took a Master of Arts degree. He was ready to study for his Bachelor of Science degree, but he took an opportunity to take a temporary post at the Royal Botanical Gardens in Calcutta.

While in Calcutta he became the curator of the Herbarium and made in the North Cachar Hills a large collection of plants, including a number of new species which he later described and named. In 1899 he was offered a job as Assistant for India at Kew Gardens in London, a role in which he contributed his knowledge of Indian and South West Asian botany.

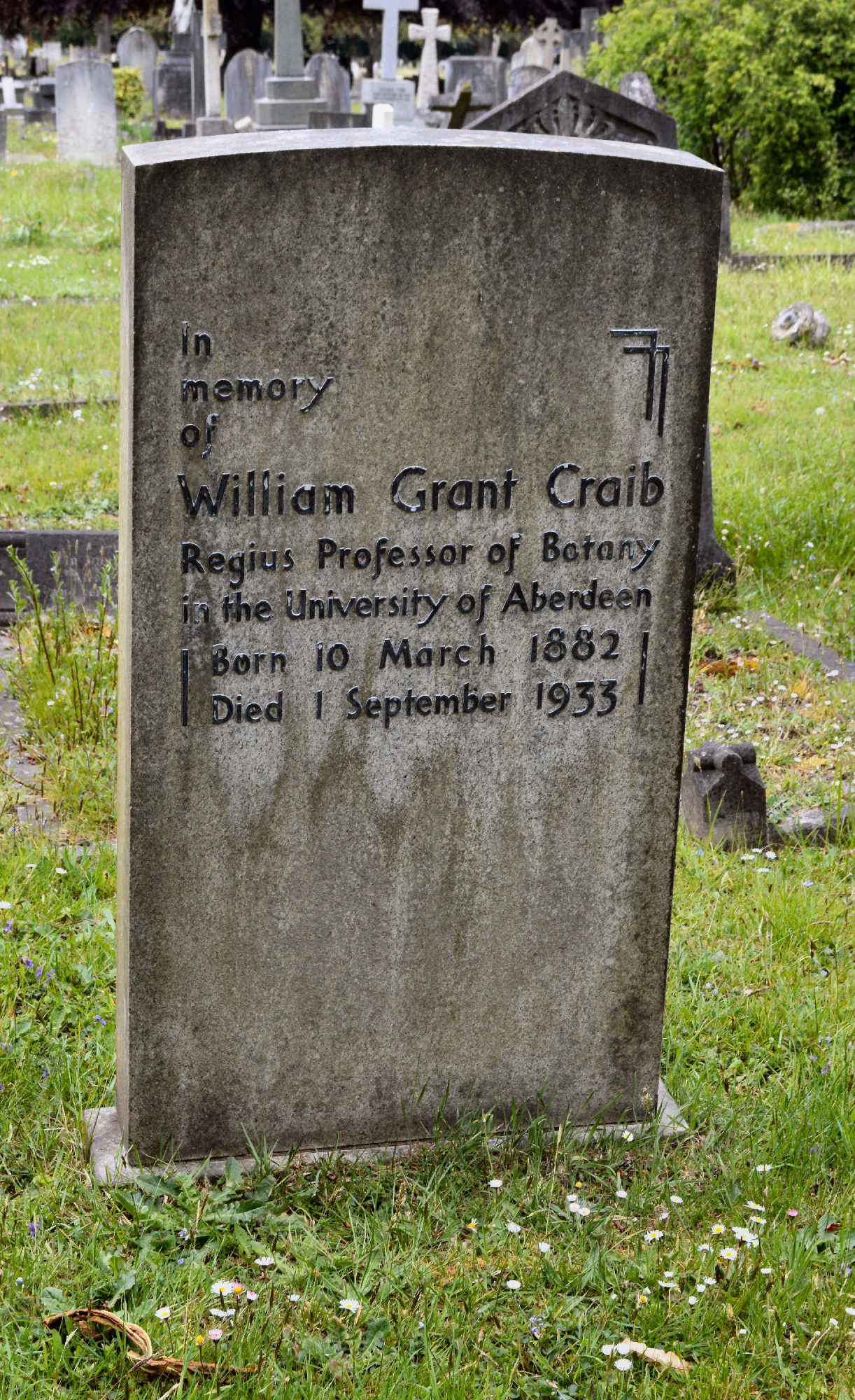
Richmond cemetery

In 1915 he was offered and took the post as a lecturer in forest botany and Indian trees at Edinburgh. In 1920 he was appointed Regius Professor of Botany at Aberdeen University. As well as his teaching work and training research students, he studied with his pupils Siamese flora on which he wrote many books. In 1921 at a meeting of the British Association, Craib lost one of his legs in a serious accident.

He was elected a fellow of the Royal Society of Edinburgh in 1920. His proposers were Sir Isaac Bayley Balfour, Sir David Prain, Sir Thomas Hudson Beare, and James Hartley Ashworth.

During his vacations for university, he worked in the Herbarium at the Royal Botanical Gardens at Kew in London, particularly on the flora of Siam. It was during one of his stays at Kew that he became ill and died on 1 September 1933 aged 51, and is buried in Richmond Cemetery.

Craib is commemorated in the genera Craibiodendron and Craibia, as well as a number of species.

== Family ==
He married Mary Beatrice Turner in 1917. They had no children.

== Selected publications ==
The Flora of Banffshire. Craib, William Grant, 1912. Banffshire Journal Limited, Transactions of the Banffshire Field Club

Florae siamensis enumeratio : a list of the plants known from Siam, with records of their occurrence. Craib, William Grant, Kerr, Arthur Francis George. 1925–1931. Siam Society, Bangkok : The Bangkok times press
