= Lamae railway station =

Railway station in Thailand

Coordinates: 9.7747°N 99.1079°E

Lamae ละแม
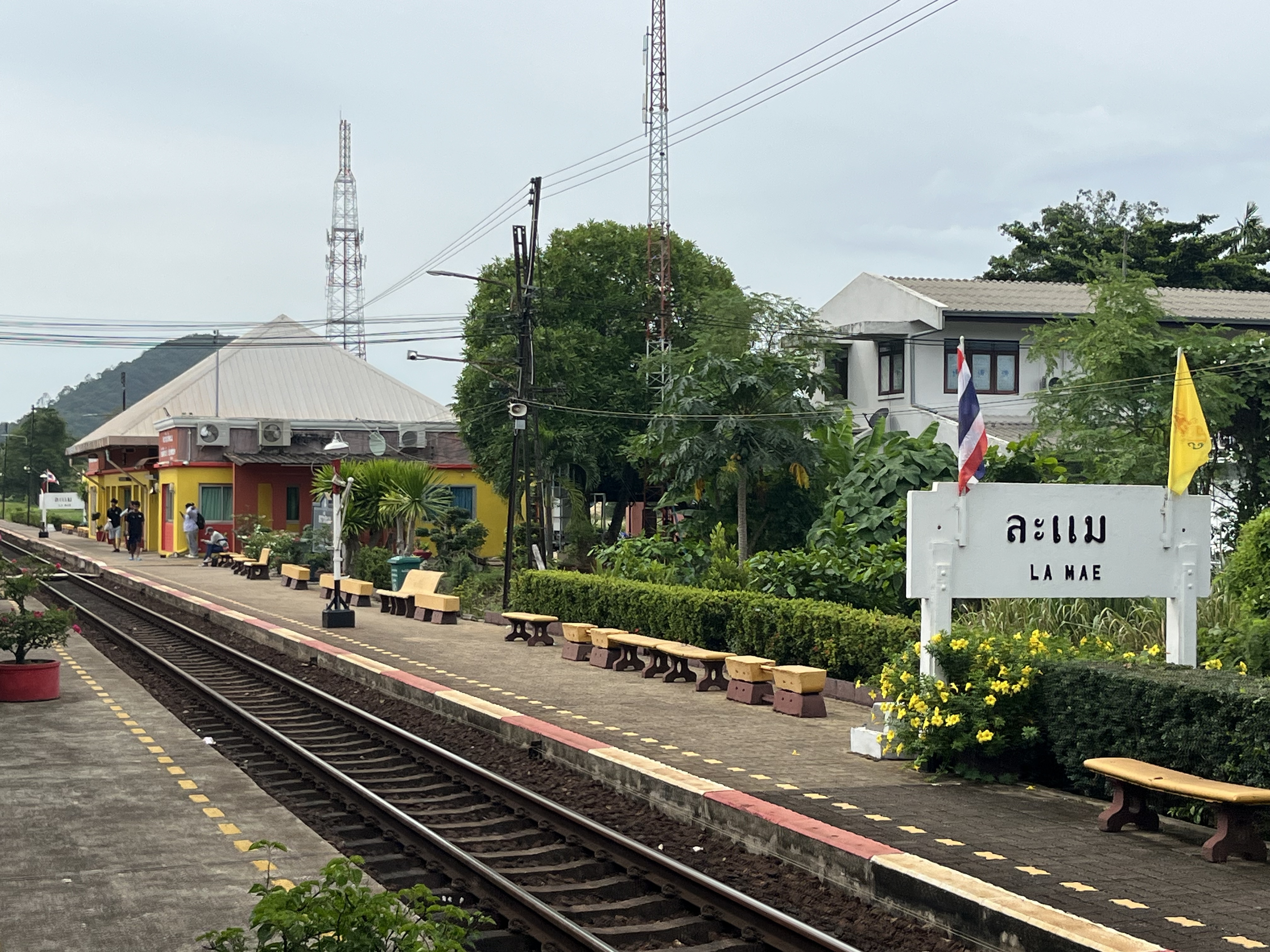

General information
- Location: Rat Phatthana Road, Lamae Subdistrict, Lamae District, Chumphon
- Owner: State Railway of Thailand
- Line: Southern Line
- Platforms: 2
- Tracks: 3

Other information
- Station code: แม.

Services
Preceding station	State Railway of Thailand	Following station
Hua Mat Halt towards Hua Lamphong or Krung Thep Aphiwat	Southern Line	Ban Duat towards Su-ngai Kolok
Location

Lamae railway station is a railway station located in Lamae Subdistrict, Lamae District, Chumphon. It is a class 2 railway station located 533.7 km (331.6 mi) from Bangkok railway station.

== Services ==
- Rapid 170 Yala-Bangkok
- Rapid 171/172 Bangkok-Sungai Kolok-Bangkok
- Rapid 173/174 Bangkok-Nakhon Si Thammarat-Bangkok
- Rapid 167/168 Bangkok-Kantang-Bangkok
- Local 445/446 Chumphon-Hat Yai Junction-Chumphon

== Gallery ==
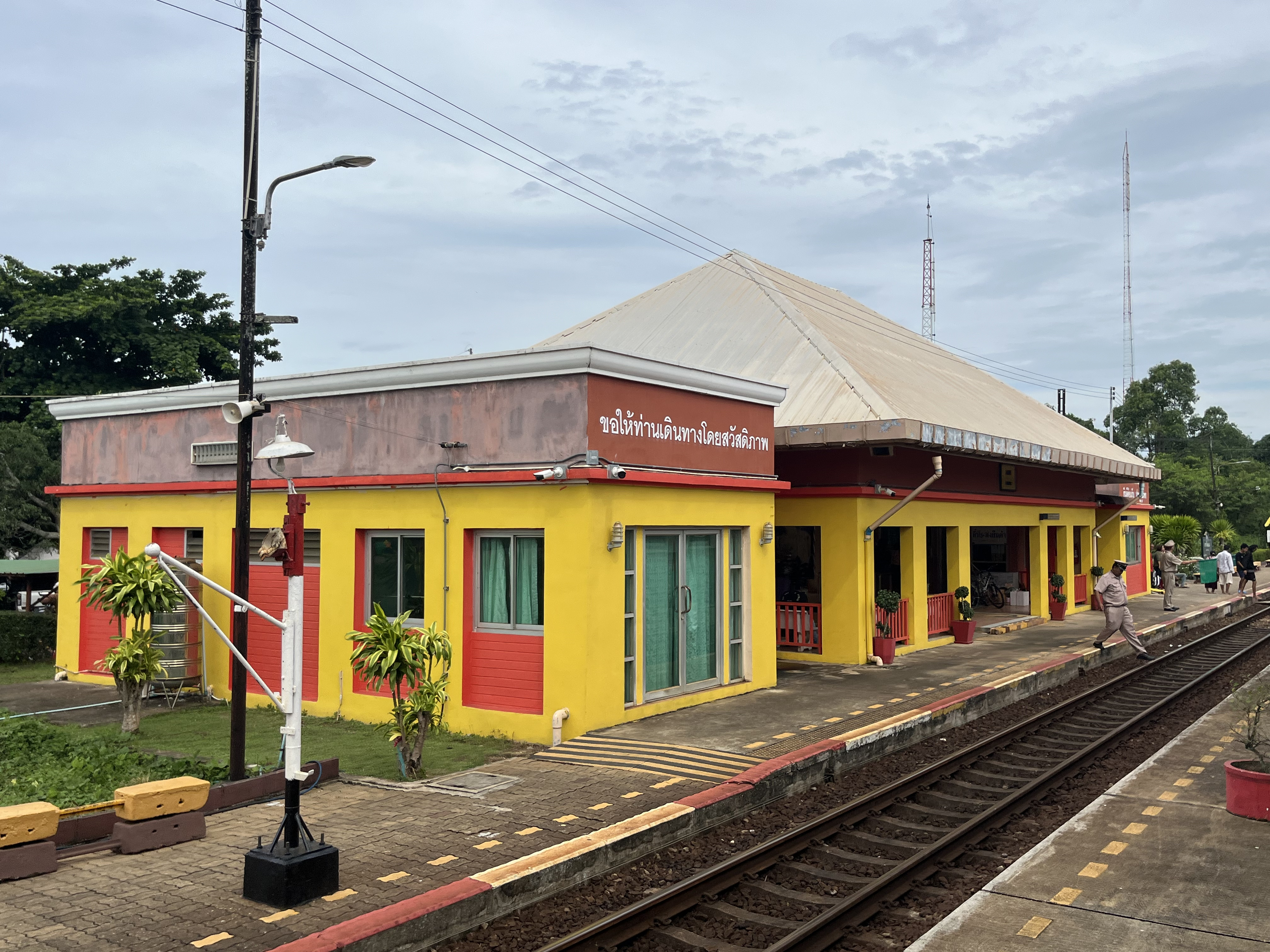
Current station building
