= Ban Duat railway station =

Railway station in Thailand

Coordinates: 9.7187°N 99.1233°E

Ban Duat บ้านดวด
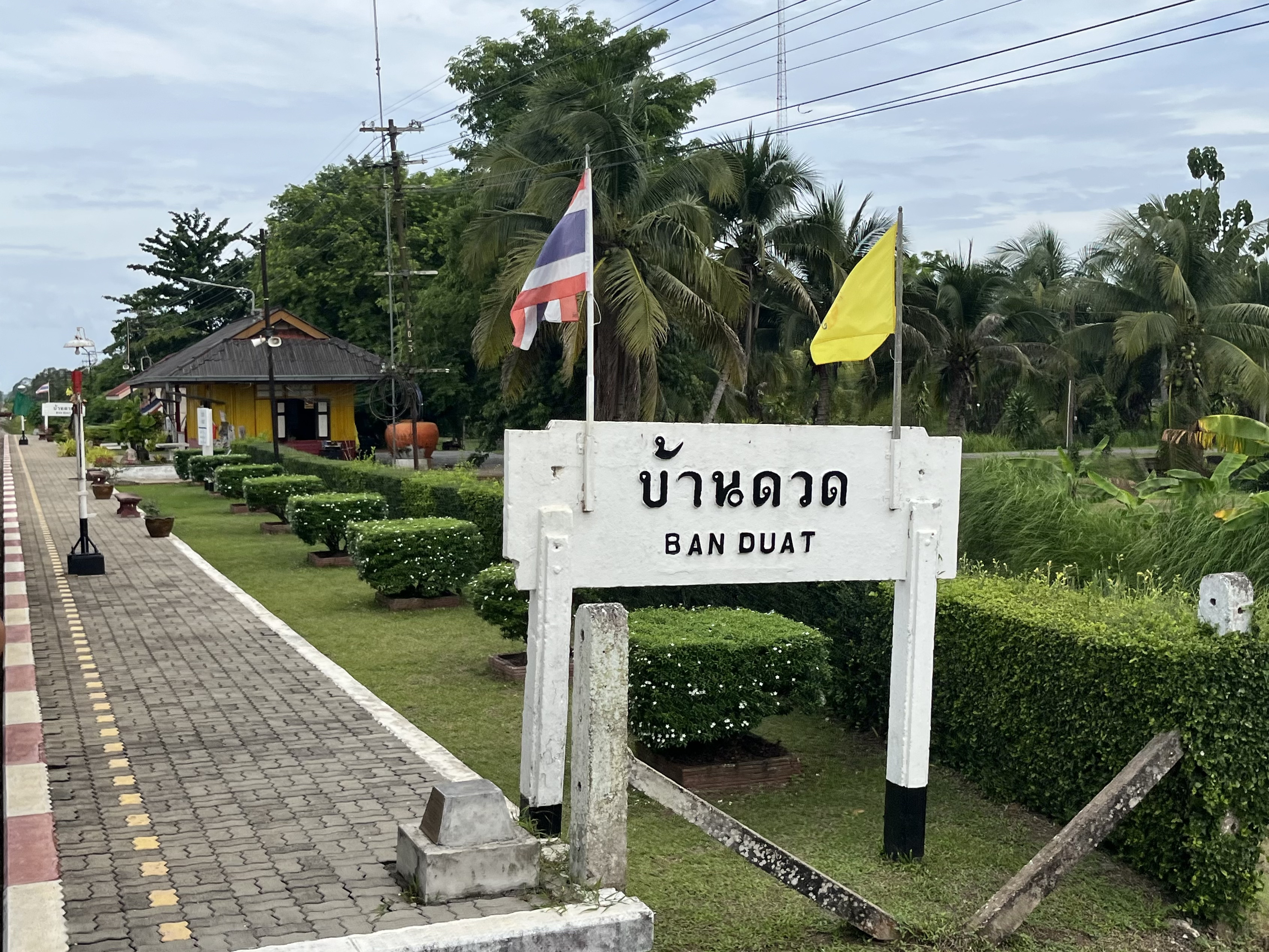

General information
- Location: Mu 2 (Ban Duat), Suan Taeng Subdistrict, Lamae District, Chumphon
- Owner: State Railway of Thailand
- Line: Southern Line
- Platforms: 1
- Tracks: 2

Other information
- Station code: ดว.

Services
| Preceding station | State Railway of Thailand | Following station |
|---|---|---|
| Lamae towards Hua Lamphong or Krung Thep Aphiwat | Southern Line | Khanthuli towards Su-ngai Kolok |
Location

Ban Duat station (Thai: สถานีบ้านดวด) is a railway station located in Suan Taeng Subdistrict, Lamae District, Chumphon. It is a class 3 railway station located 560.149 km (348.1 mi) from Thon Buri Railway Station.

== Services ==
- Local No. 445/446 Chumphon-Hat Yai Junction-Chumphon

== Gallery ==
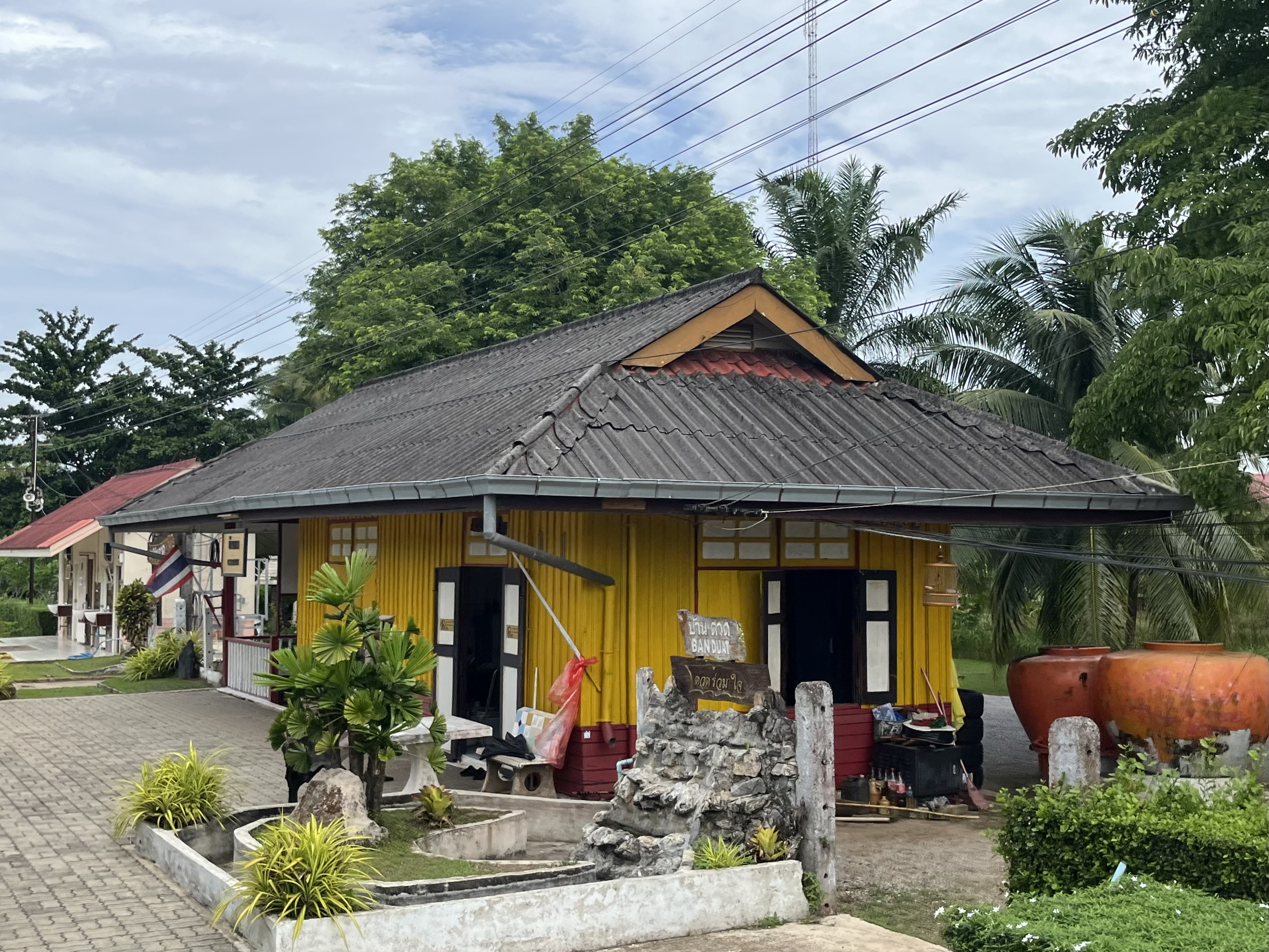
Station building
