= Khlong Khanan railway station =

Railway station in Thailand

Coordinates: 9.8807°N 99.0744°E

Khlong Khanan คลองขนาน
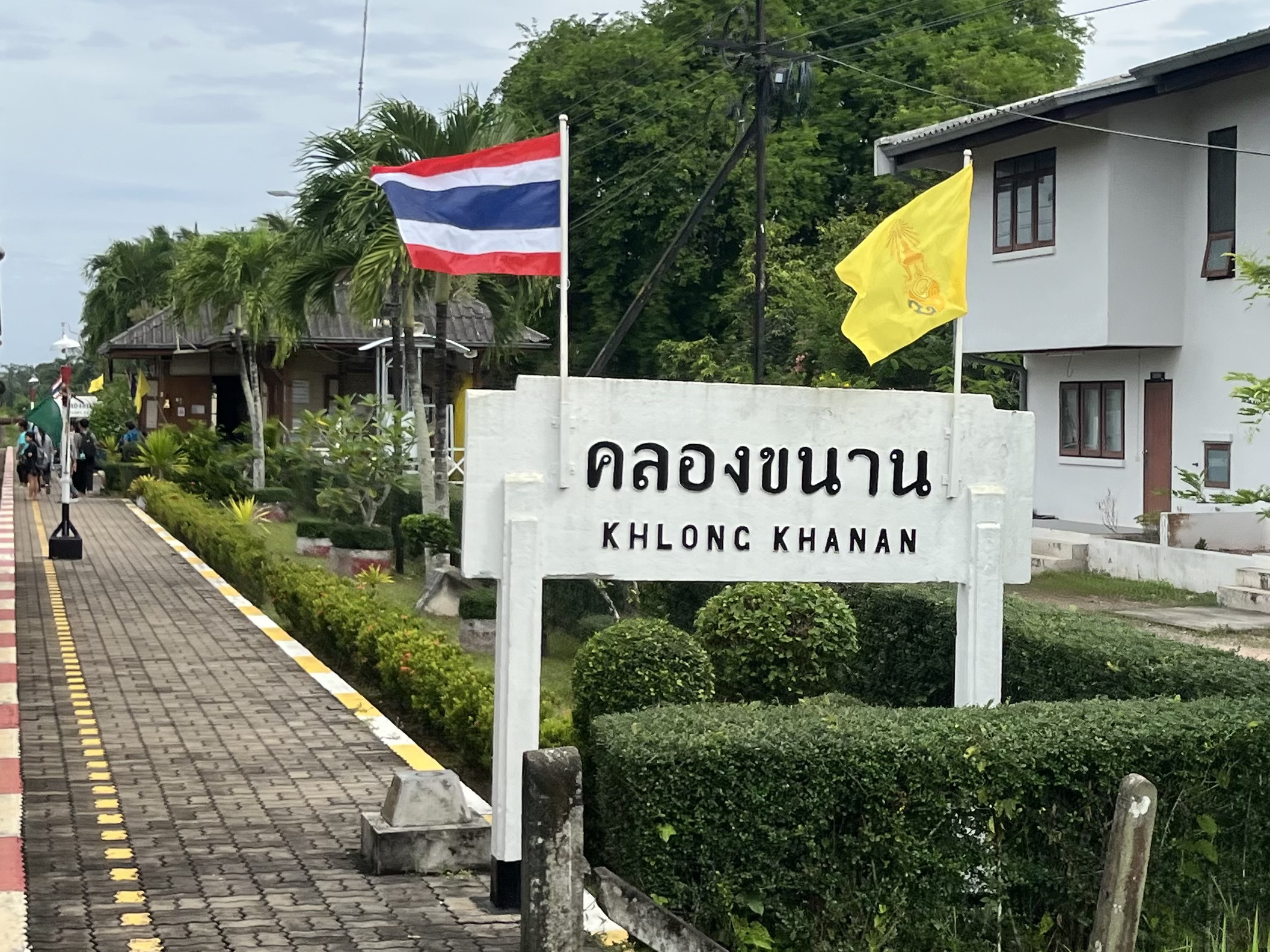

General information
- Location: Mu 10 (Ban Khlong Khanan), Ban Khuan Subdistrict, Lang Suan District, Chumphon
- Owner: State Railway of Thailand
- Line: Southern Line
- Platforms: 1
- Tracks: 2

Other information
- Station code: คข.

Services
Preceding station	State Railway of Thailand	Following station
Lang Suan towards Hua Lamphong or Krung Thep Aphiwat	Southern Line	Hua Mat Halt towards Su-ngai Kolok
Location

Khlong Khanan railway station is a railway station located in Ban Khuan Subdistrict, Lang Suan District, Chumphon. It is a class 3 railway station located 541.032 km (336.2 mi) from Thon Buri railway station.

== Services ==
- Local No. 445/446 Chumphon-Hat Yai Junction-Chumphon

== Gallery ==
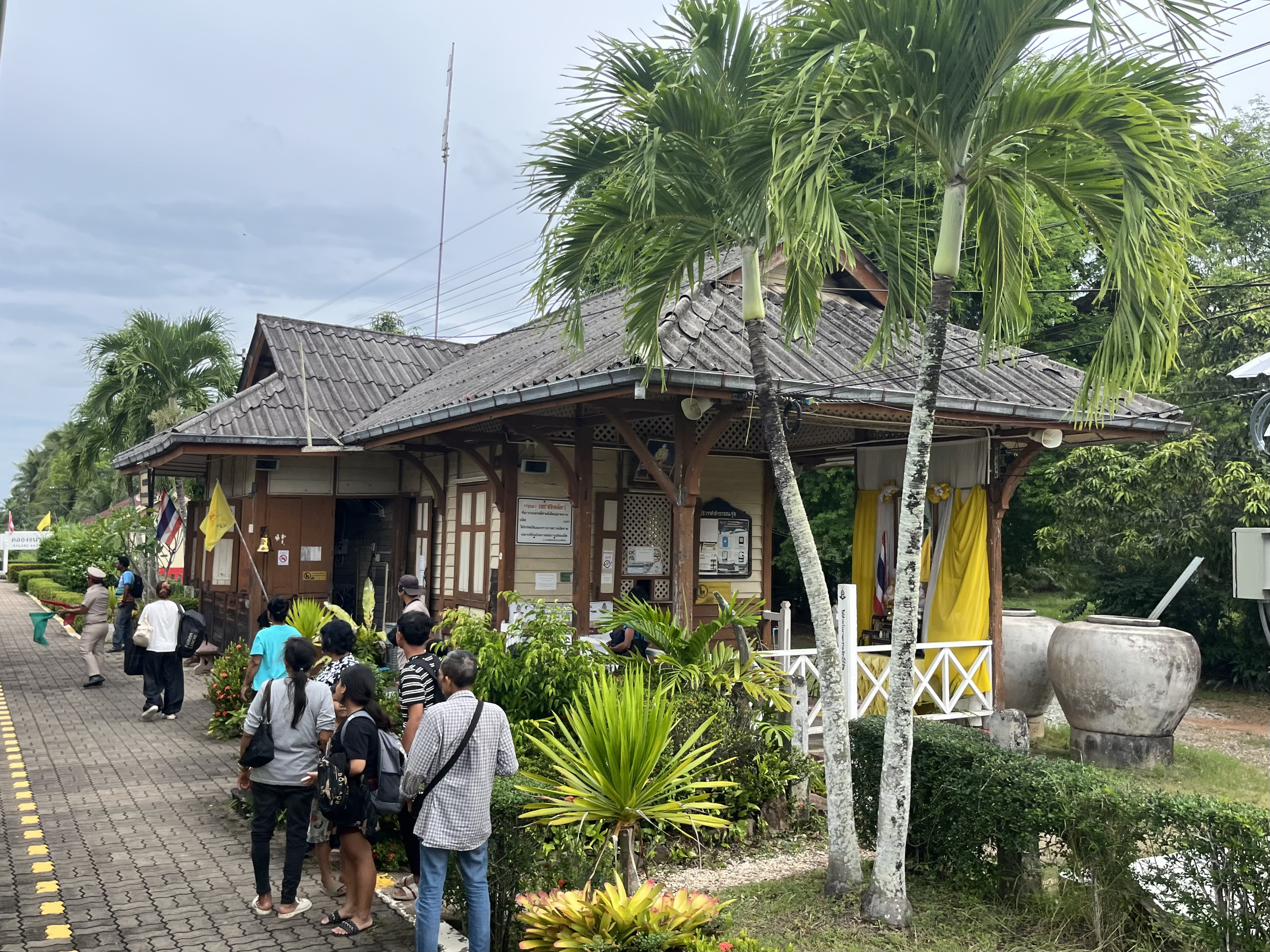
Station building
