= Khuan Hin Mui railway station =

Railway station in Thailand

Coordinates: 10.0099°N 99.0912°E

Khuan Hin Mui ควนหินมุ้ย
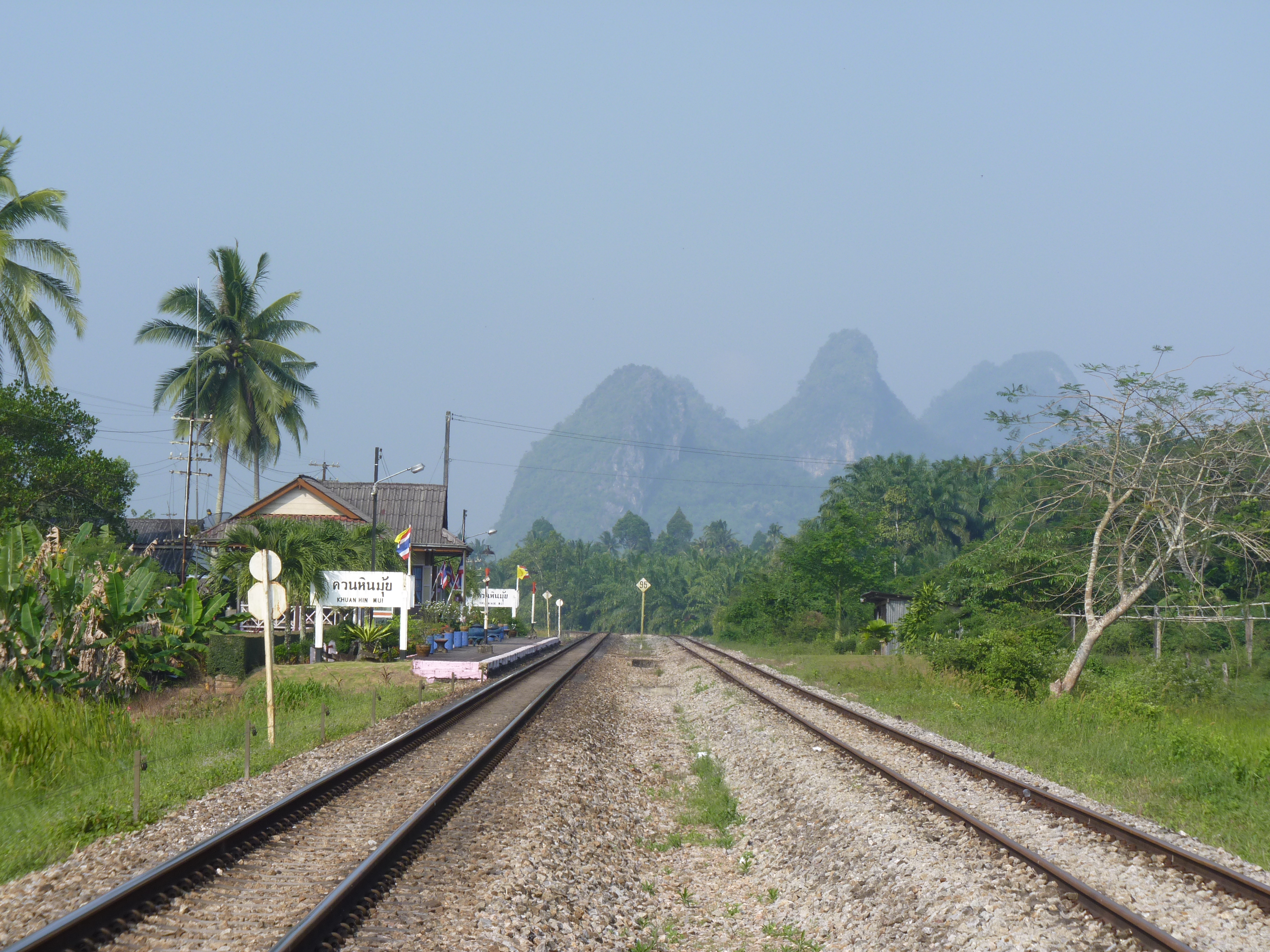
- Khuan Hin Mui railway station with mountains in the background

General information
- Location: National Highway No. 4097, Mu 9 (Ban Khuan Hin Mui), Na Kha Subdistrict, Lang Suan District, Chumphon
- Owner: State Railway of Thailand
- Line: Southern Line
- Platforms: 1
- Tracks: 2

Other information
- Station code: มย.

Services
Preceding station	State Railway of Thailand	Following station
Tha Thong Halt towards Hua Lamphong or Krung Thep Aphiwat	Southern Line	Lang Suan towards Su-ngai Kolok
Location

Khuan Hin Mui railway station is a railway station located in Na Kha Subdistrict, Lang Suan District, Chumphon. It is a class 3 railway station located 526.088 km (326.9 mi) from Thon Buri railway station.

The station is known for its setting, with mountains as a backdrop, unlike the northern or northeastern railway lines.

== Services ==
- Ordinary No. 254/255 Lang Suan-Thon Buri-Lang Suan
- Local No. 445/446 Chumphon-Hat Yai Junction-Chumphon
