= Khanthuli railway station =

Railway station in Thailand

Coordinates: 9.6668°N 99.1461°E

Khanthuli คันธุลี
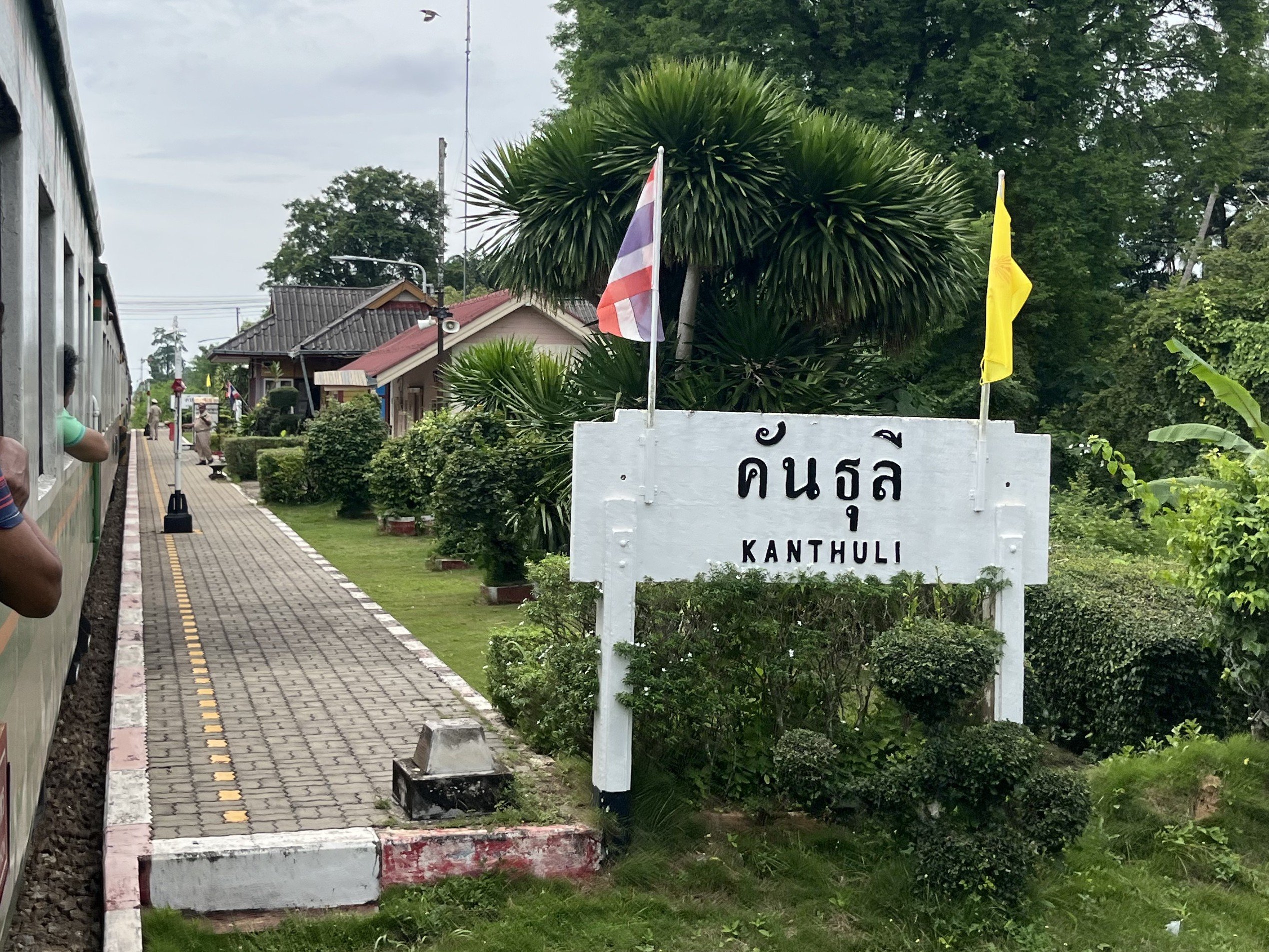

General information
- Location: Mu 2 (Ban Khanthuli), Khanthuli Subdistrict, Tha Chana District, Surat Thani
- Owner: State Railway of Thailand
- Line: Southern Line
- Platforms: 1
- Tracks: 2

Other information
- Station code: คล.

Services
Preceding station	State Railway of Thailand	Following station
Ban Duat towards Hua Lamphong or Krung Thep Aphiwat	Southern Line	Don Thup towards Su-ngai Kolok
Location

Khanthuli railway station is a railway station located in Khanthuli Subdistrict, Tha Chana District, Surat Thani. It is a class 3 railway station located 566.374 km (351.9 mi) from Thon Buri railway station.

== Services ==
- Local No. 445/446 Chumphon-Hat Yai Junction-Chumphon

== Gallery ==
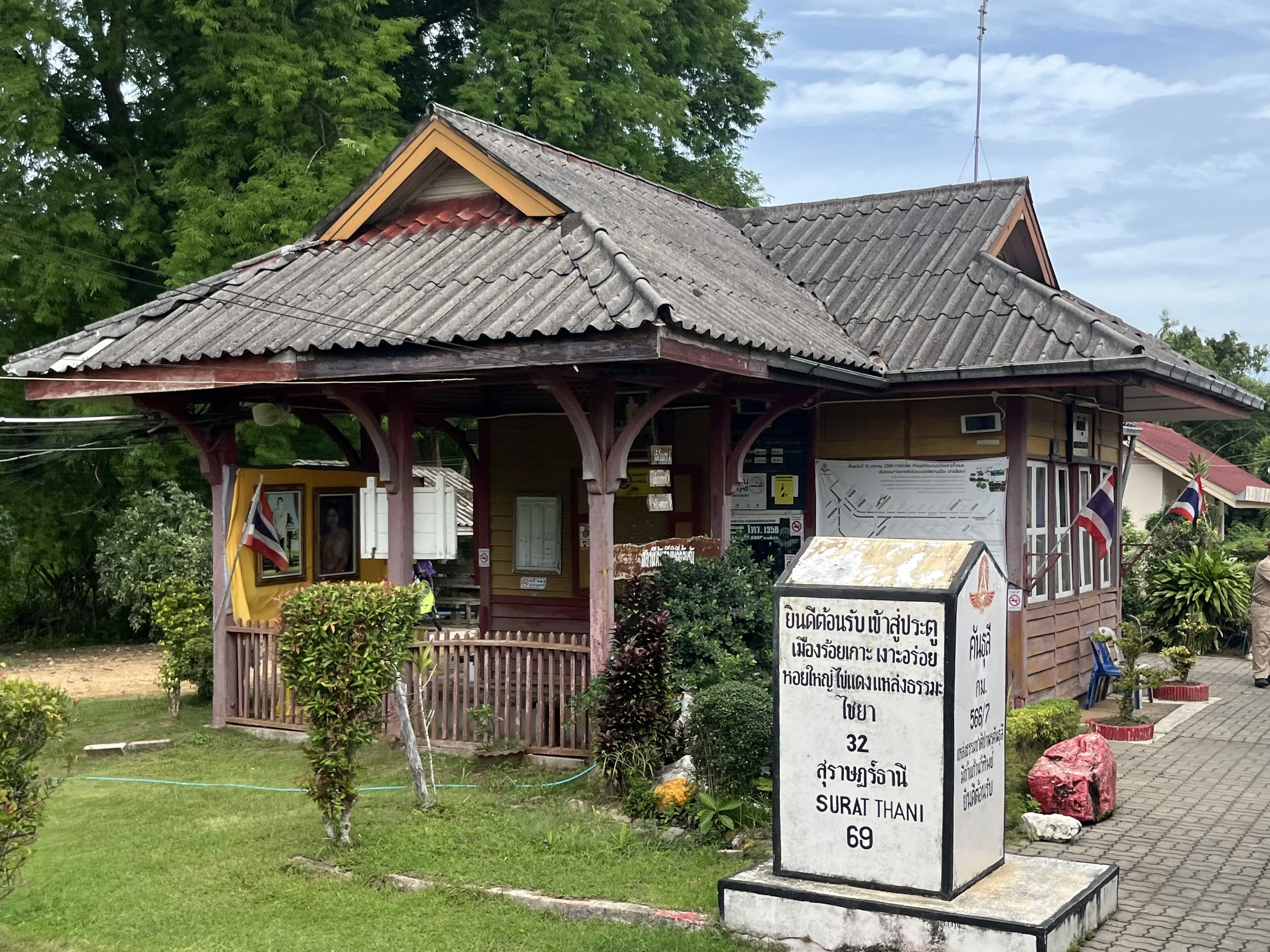
Station building
