= Tha Thong railway halt =

Railway halt in Thailand

Tha Thong ท่าทอง
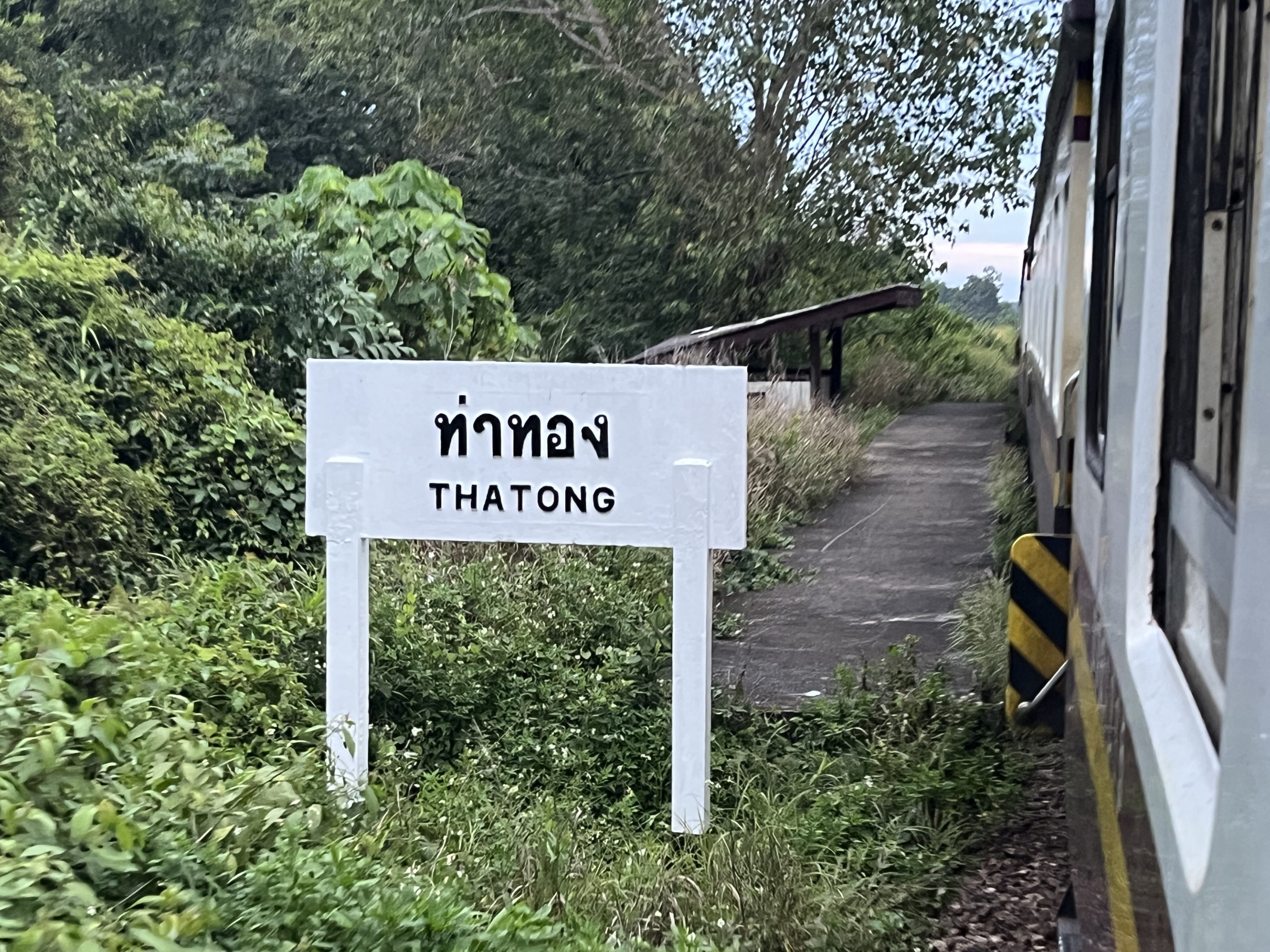

General information
- Location: Mu 1 (Ban Tha Thong), Tako Subdistrict, Thung Tako District, Chumphon
- Coordinates: 10.0439°N 99.0933°E
- Owner: State Railway of Thailand
- Line: Southern Line
- Platforms: 1
- Tracks: 1

Other information
- Station code: ทอ.

Services
Preceding station	State Railway of Thailand	Following station
Pak Tako towards Hua Lamphong or Krung Thep Aphiwat	Southern Line	Khuan Hin Mui towards Su-ngai Kolok
Location

Tha Thong Railway Halt is a railway halt located in Tako Subdistrict, Thung Tako District, Chumphon. It is located 522.304 km (324.5 mi) from Thon Buri Railway Station.

== Train services ==
- Ordinary No. 254/255 Lang Suan-Thon Buri-Lang Suan
- Local No. 445/446 Chumphon-Hat Yai Junction-Chumphon
