= Don Thup railway station =

Railway station in Thailand

Coordinates: 9.6347°N 99.1550°E

Don Thup ดอนธูป

General information
- Location: National Highway No.4112, Mu 3 (Ban Don Thup), Khanthuli Subdistrict, Tha Chana District, Surat Thani
- Owner: State Railway of Thailand
- Line: Southern Line
- Platforms: 1
- Tracks: 2

Other information
- Station code: ดธ.

Services
Preceding station	State Railway of Thailand	Following station
Khanthuli towards Hua Lamphong or Krung Thep Aphiwat	Southern Line	Tha Chana towards Su-ngai Kolok
Location

Don Thup station (Thai: สถานีดอนธูป) is a railway station located in Khanthuli Subdistrict, Tha Chana District, Surat Thani. It is a class 3 railway station located 570.057 km (354.2 mi) from Thon Buri railway station.

== Services ==
- Local No. 445/446 Chumphon-Hat Yai Junction-Chumphon

== Gallery ==
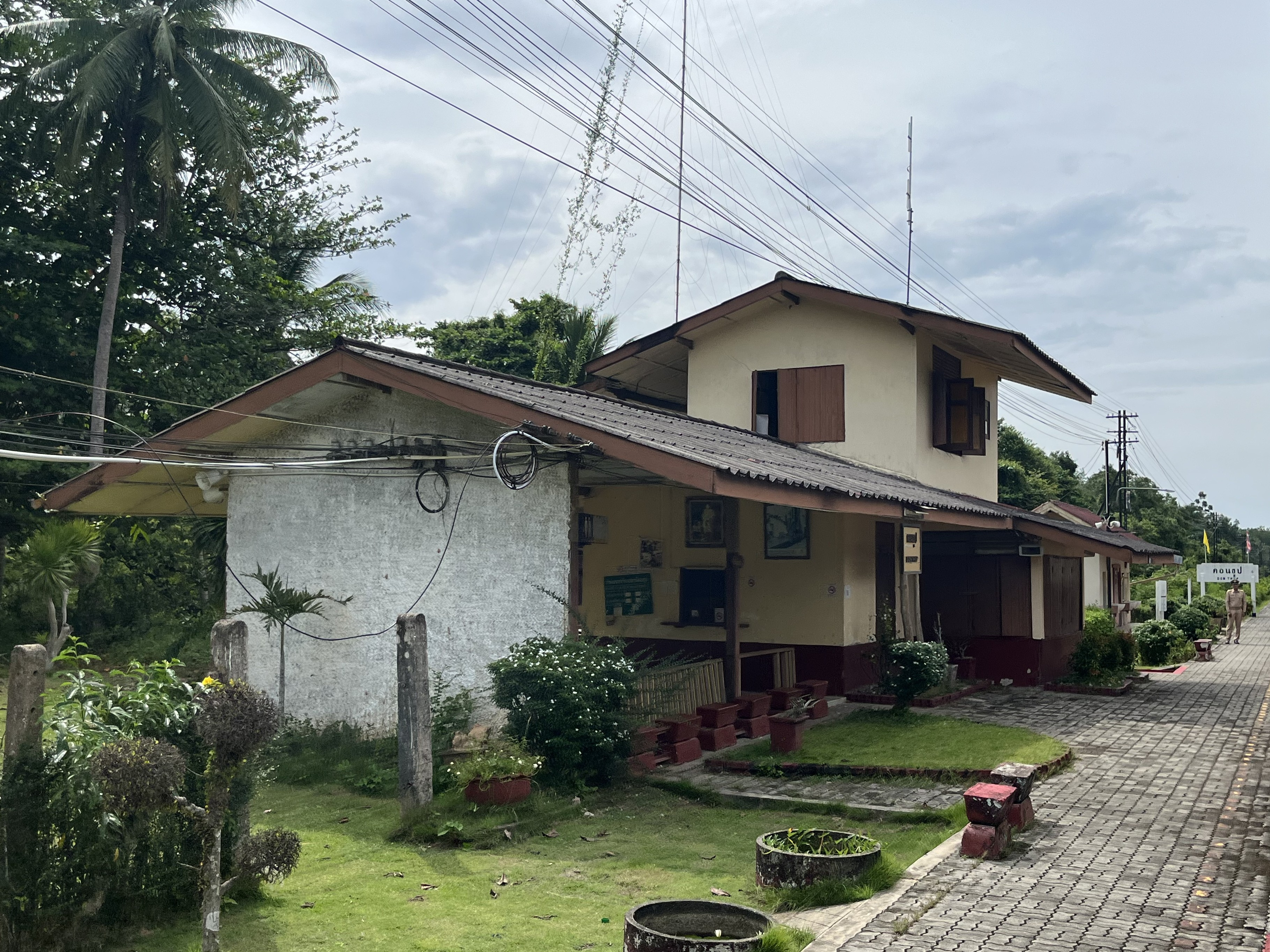
Station building
