= Lang Suan railway station =

Railway station in Thailand

Coordinates: 9.9492°N 99.0765°E

Lang Suan หลังสวน
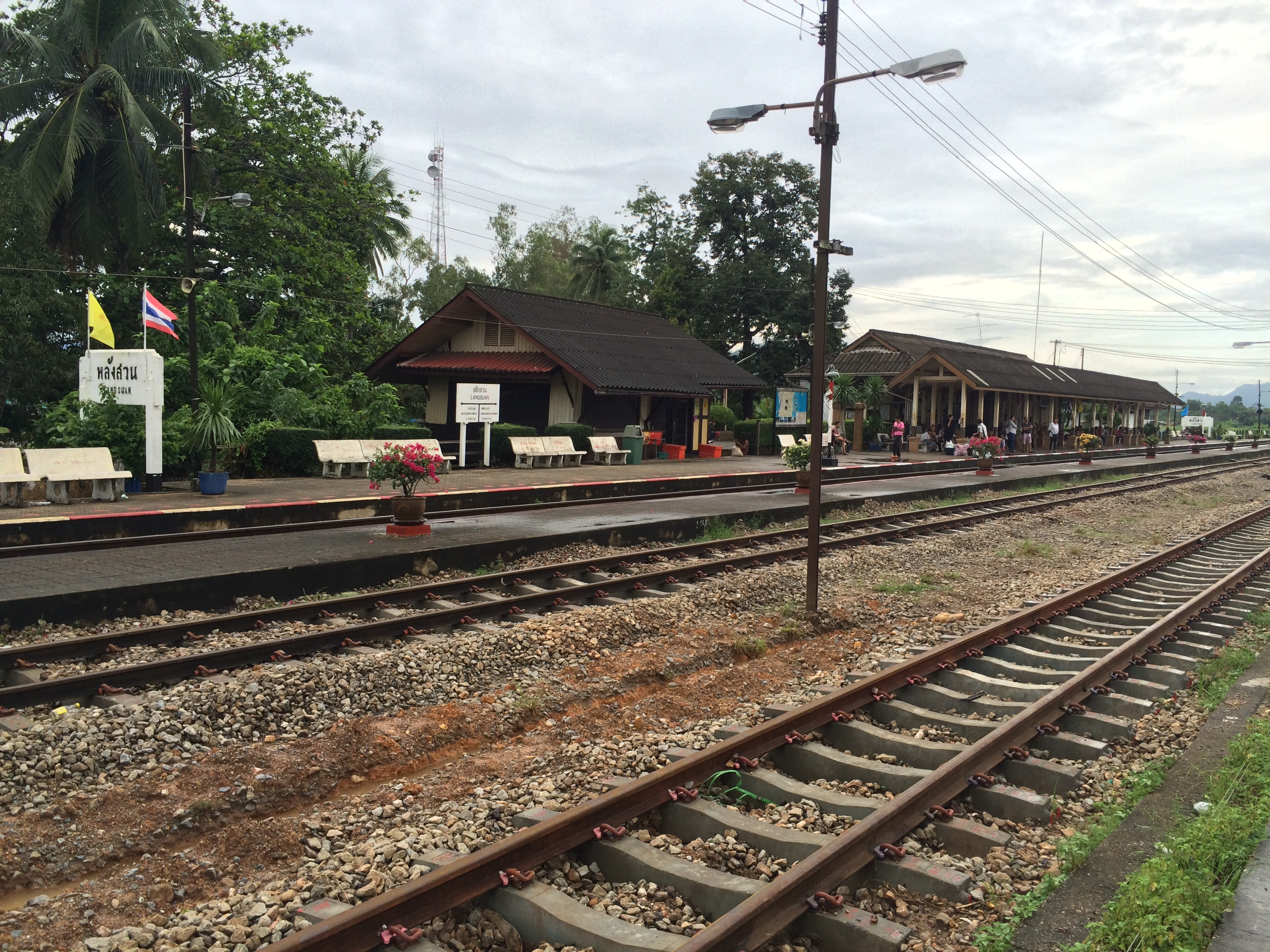

General information
- Location: Sukpracha Road, Khan Ngoen Subdistrict, Lang Suan District, Chumphon
- Owner: State Railway of Thailand
- Platforms: 2
- Tracks: 3

Other information
- Station code: งส.

History
- Opened: July 1917

Services
| Preceding station | State Railway of Thailand | Following station |
|---|---|---|
| Khuan Hin Mui towards Hua Lamphong or Krung Thep Aphiwat | Southern Line | Khlong Khanan towards Su-ngai Kolok |
Location

Lang Suan railway station is a railway station located in Khan Ngoen Subdistrict, Lang Suan District, Chumphon. It is a class 1 railway station (but not all trains stop here), located 533.3 km (331.4 mi) from Thon Buri railway station. Train services from Thon Buri railway station reach the furthest extent here. The station opened in July 1917.

== Gallery ==
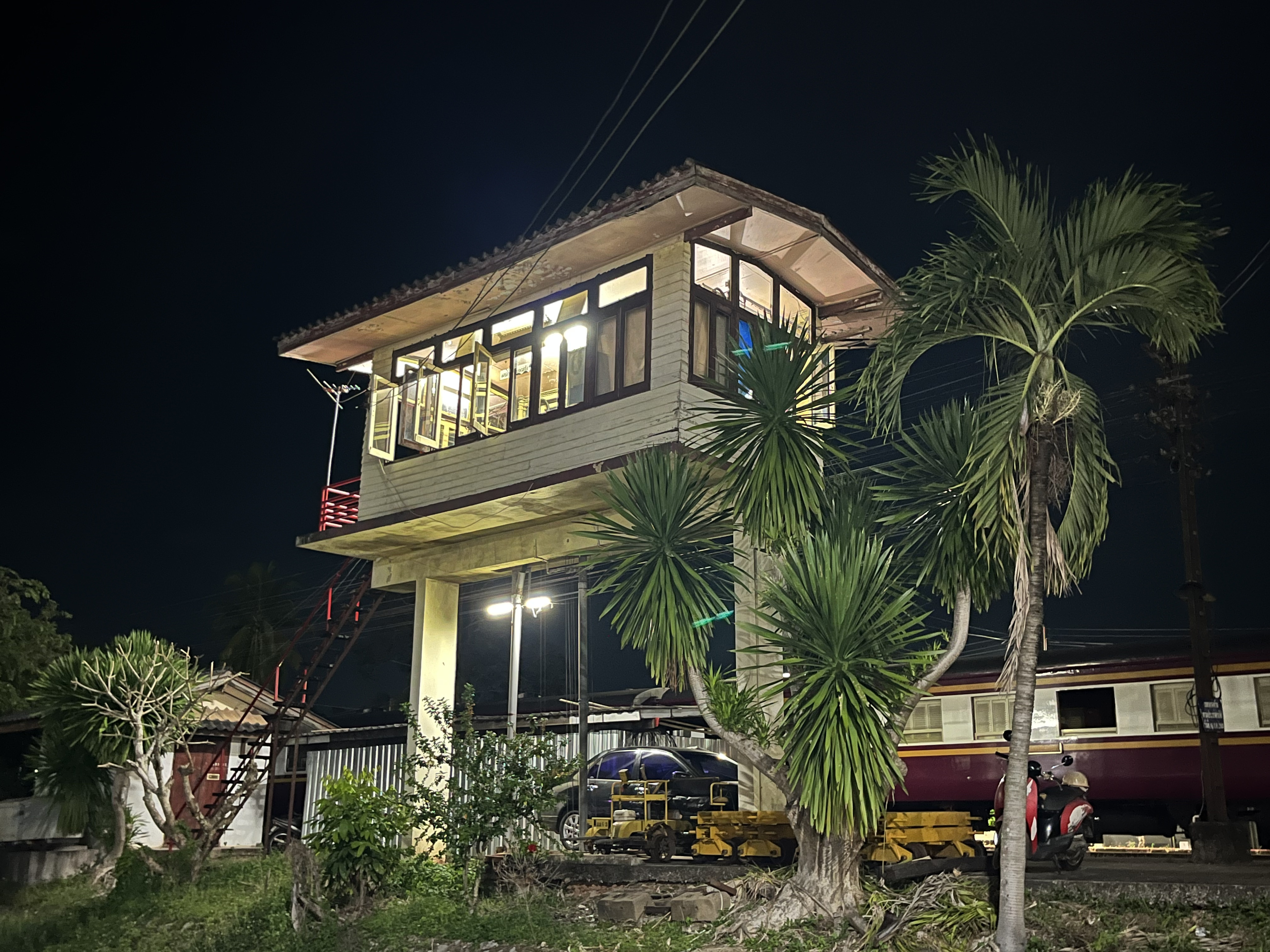
Lang Suan Signalbox
