= Hua Mat railway halt =

Railway halt in Thailand

Hua Mat หัวมาด
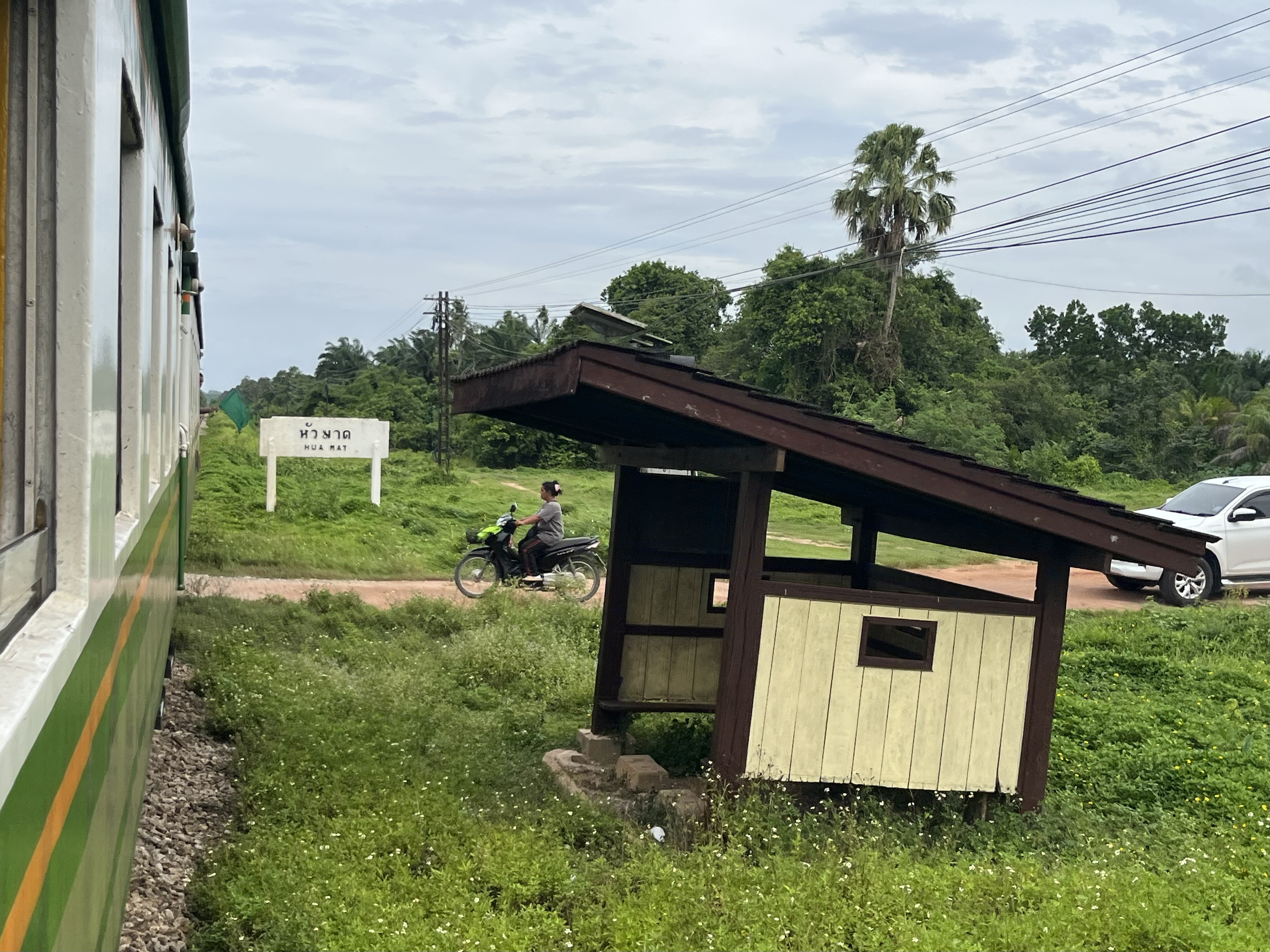

General information
- Location: Mu 5 (Ban Hua Mat), Thung Luang Subdistrict, Lamae District, Chumphon
- Coordinates: 9.8323°N 99.0840°E
- Owner: State Railway of Thailand
- Line: Southern Line
- Platforms: 1
- Tracks: 1

Other information
- Station code: มั.

Services
Preceding station	State Railway of Thailand	Following station
Khlong Khanan towards Hua Lamphong or Krung Thep Aphiwat	Southern Line	Lamae towards Su-ngai Kolok
Location

Hua Mat Railway Halt is a railway halt located in Thung Luang Subdistrict, Lamae District, Chumphon. It is located 546.531 km (339.6 mi) from Thon Buri Railway Station

== Services ==
- Local No. 445/446 Chumphon-Hat Yai Junction-Chumphon
