= Ban Khok Ma railway station =

Railway station in Thailand

Coordinates: 10.6526°N 99.2741°E

Ban Khok Ma บ้านคอกม้า
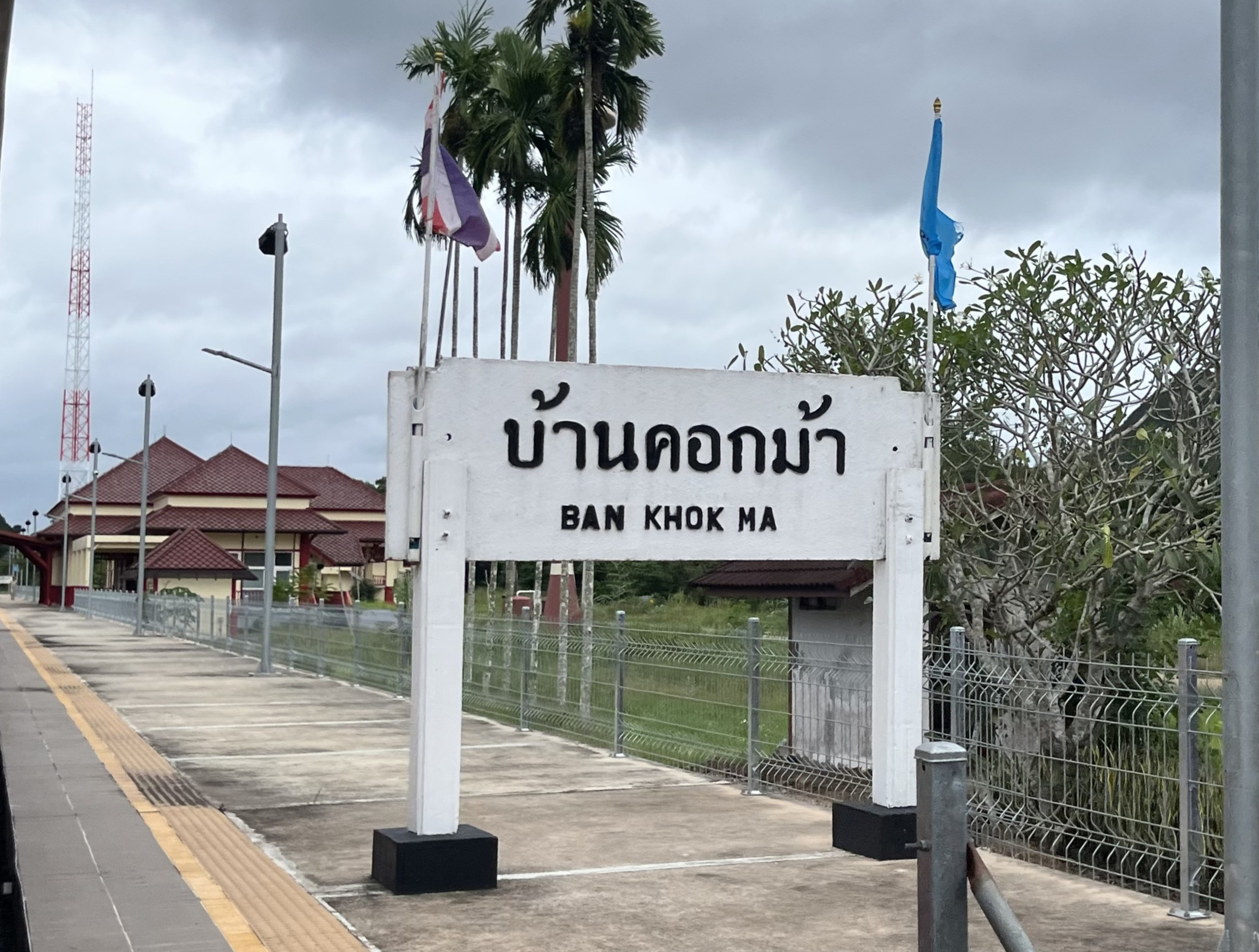
- Station in 2025

General information
- Location: Mu 6 (Ban Khok Ma), Bang Son Subdistrict, Pathio District, Chumphon
- Owner: State Railway of Thailand
- Line: Southern Line
- Platforms: 1
- Tracks: 2

Other information
- Station code: คา.

Services
Preceding station	State Railway of Thailand	Following station
Pathio towards Hua Lamphong or Krung Thep Aphiwat	Southern Line	Saphli towards Su-ngai Kolok
Location

Ban Khok Ma station (Thai: สถานีบ้านคอกม้า) is a railway station located in Bang Son Subdistrict, Pathio District, Chumphon. It is a class 3 railway station located 447.464 km (278.0 mi) from Thon Buri railway station

== Train services ==
- Ordinary 254/255 Lang Suan-Thon Buri-Lang Suan

== Gallery ==
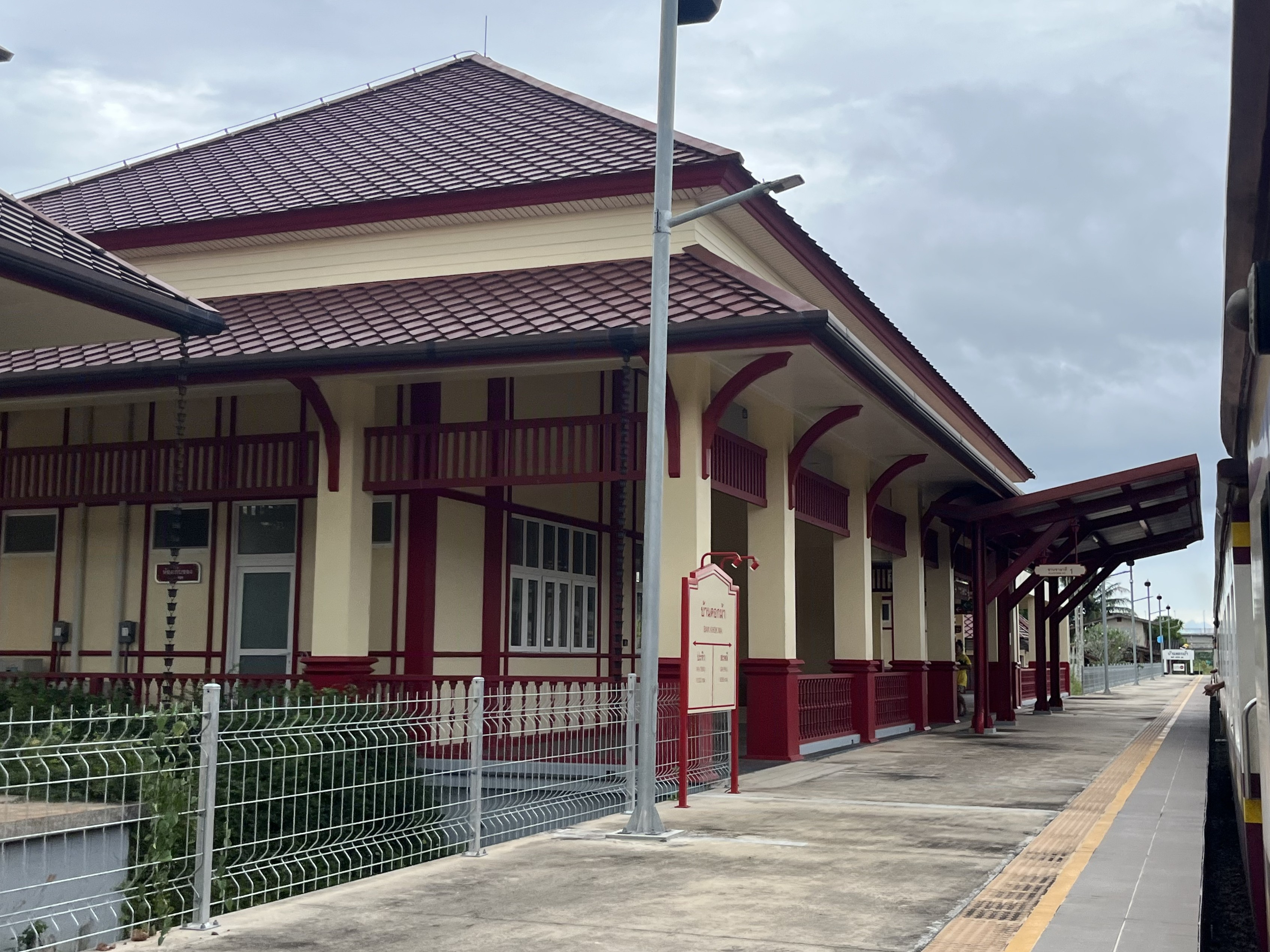
New station building

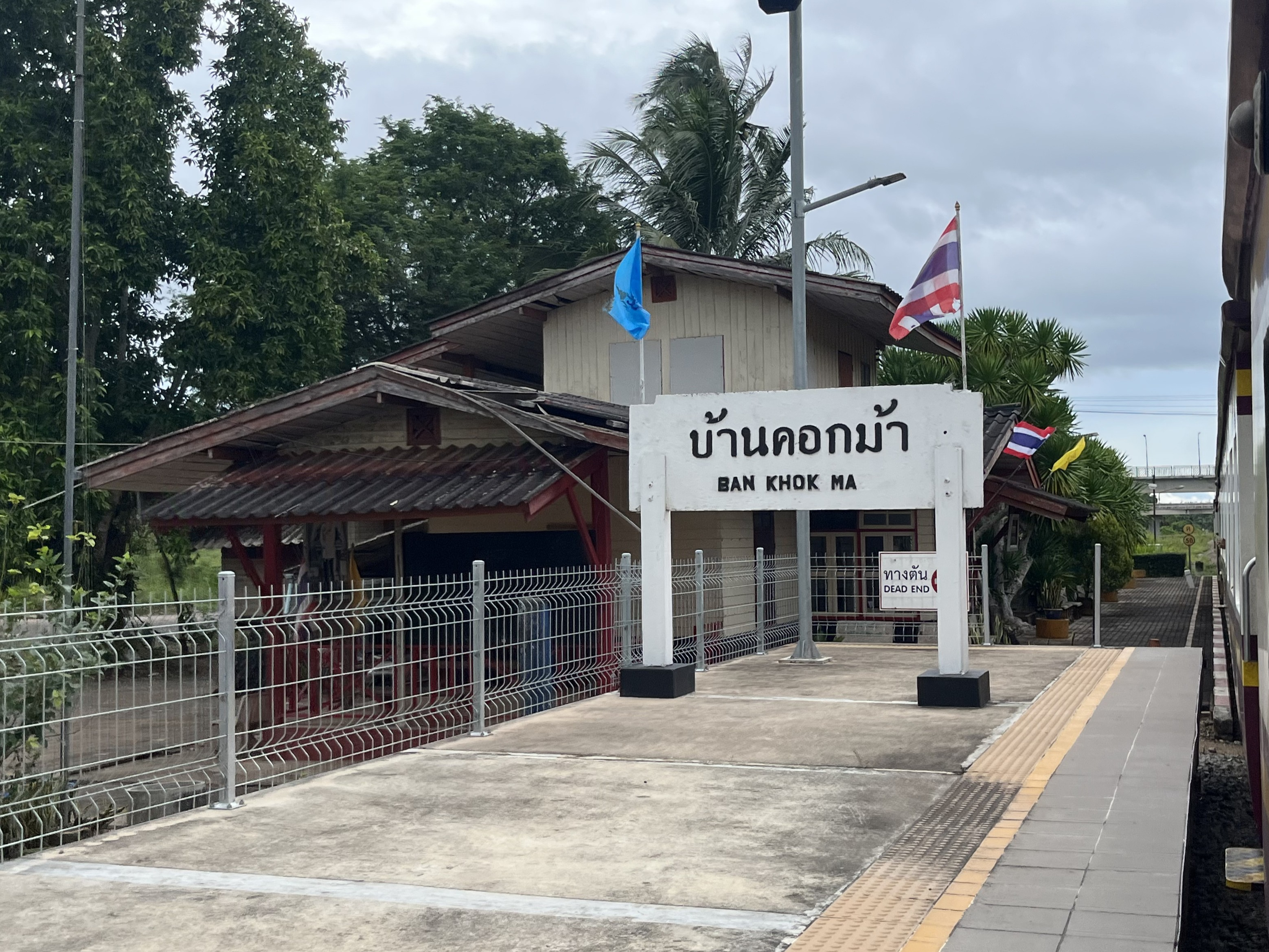
Former station building
