= Nong Nian railway halt =

Railway halt in Thailand

Nong Nian หนองเนียน
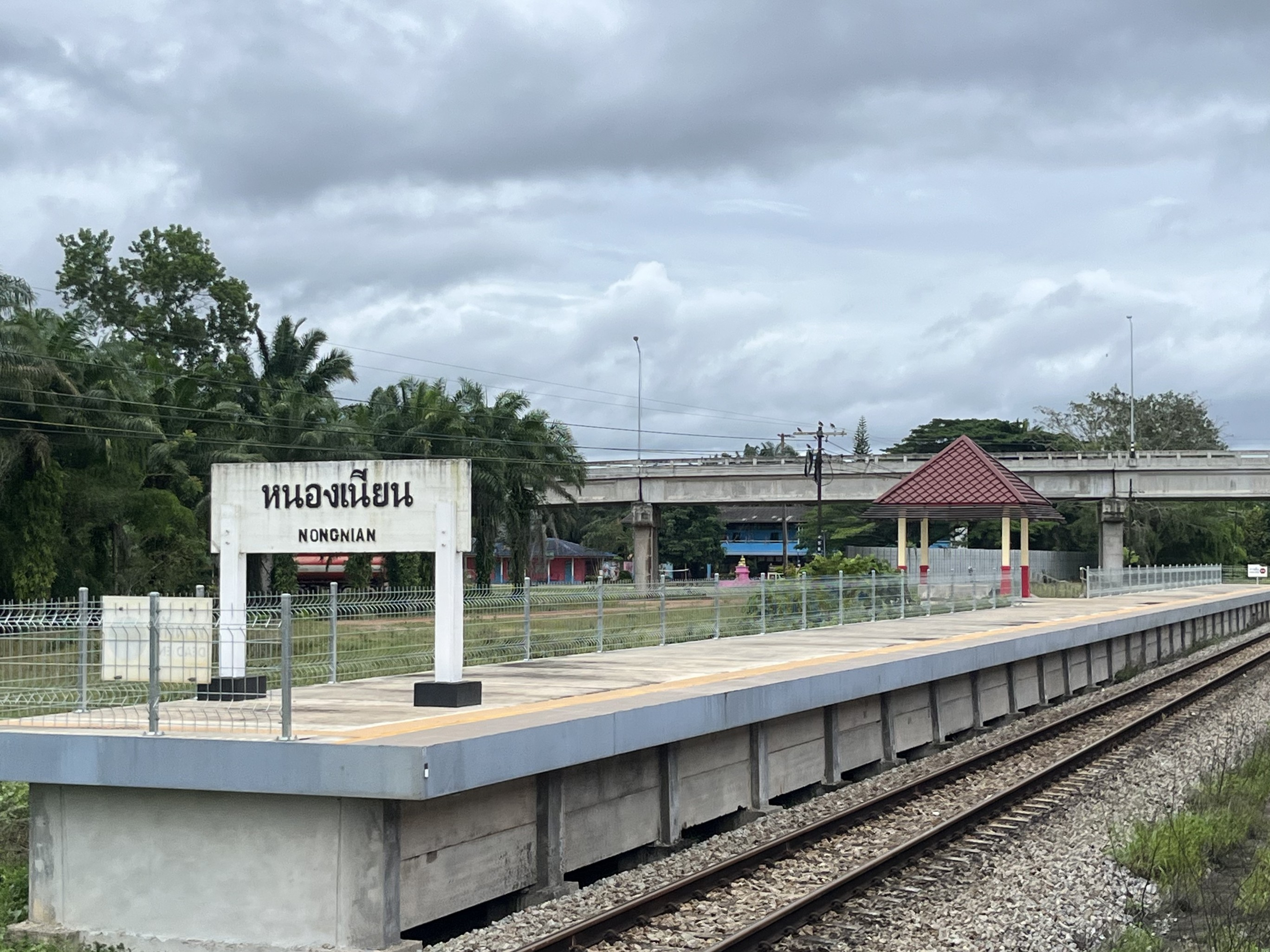
- Railway halt in 2025

General information
- Location: Mu 11 (Ban Nong Nian), Bang Luek Subdistrict, Chumphon City
- Owner: State Railway of Thailand
- Line: Southern Line
- Platforms: 1
- Tracks: 1

Other information
- Station code: งน.

Services
Preceding station	State Railway of Thailand	Following station
Saphli towards Hua Lamphong or Krung Thep Aphiwat	Southern Line	Na Cha-ang towards Su-ngai Kolok
Location

Nong Nian Railway Halt is a railway halt located in Bang Luek Subdistrict, Chumphon City, Chumphon. It is located 458.384 km (284.8 mi) from Thon Buri Railway Station.

== Train services ==
- Ordinary 254/255 Lang Suan-Thon Buri-Lang Suan
