= Pathio railway station =

Railway station in Chumphon, Thailand

Pathio ปะทิว
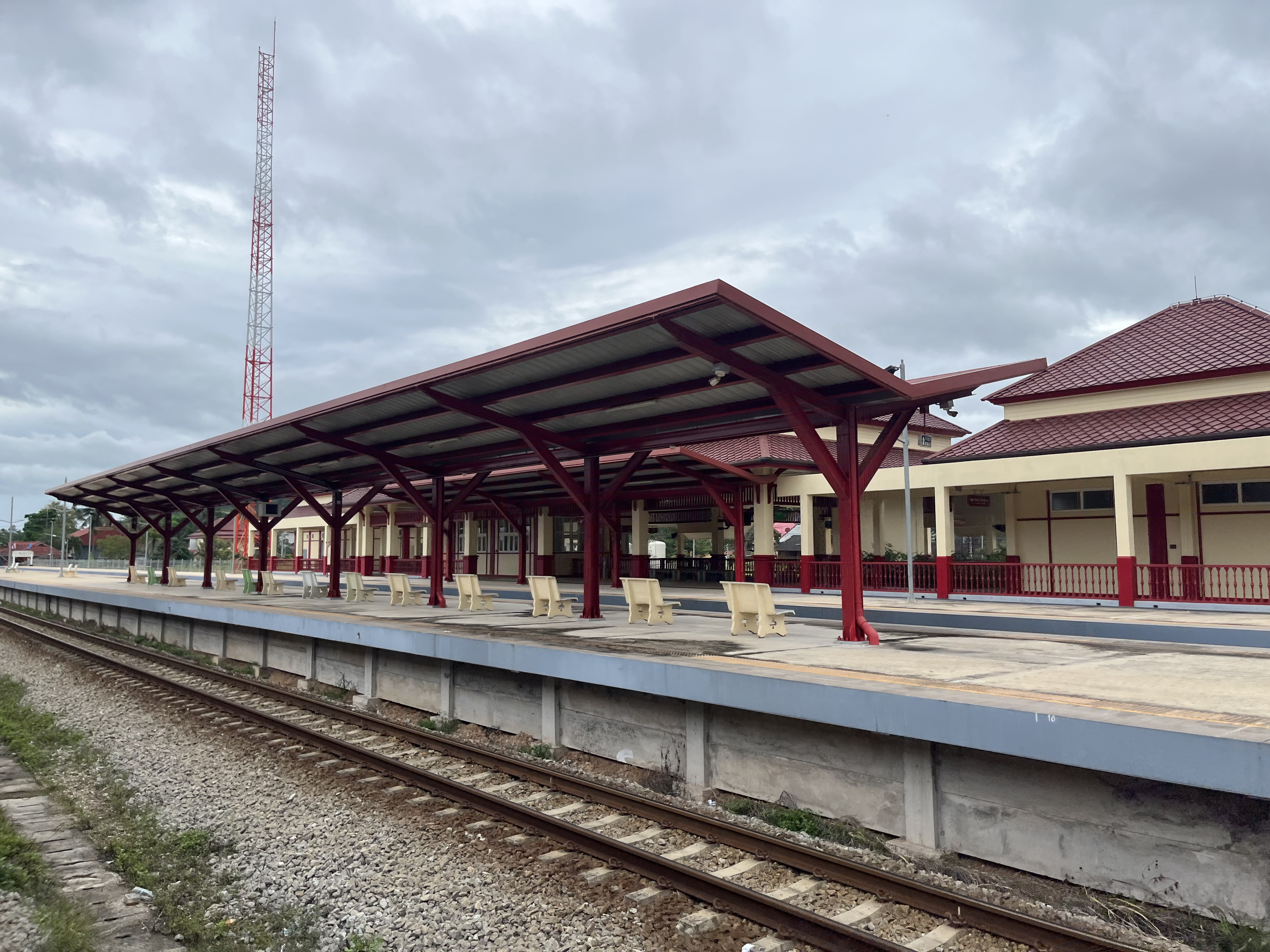
- Station in 2025

General information
- Location: National Highway No. 3203, Thale Sap Subdistrict, Pathio District, Chumphon
- Coordinates: 10.7112°N 99.3163°E
- Owner: State Railway of Thailand
- Platforms: 2
- Tracks: 3

Other information
- Station code: ะท.

History
- Former names: Bang Son

Services
Preceding station	State Railway of Thailand	Following station
Khlong Wang Chang towards Hua Lamphong or Krung Thep Aphiwat	Southern Line	Ban Khok Ma towards Su-ngai Kolok
Location

Pathio railway station is a railway station in Thale Sap Sub-district, Pathio District, Chumphon, Thailand. It is a class 2 railway station, 439.342 km (273.0 mi) south of Thon Buri railway station.

== Gallery ==
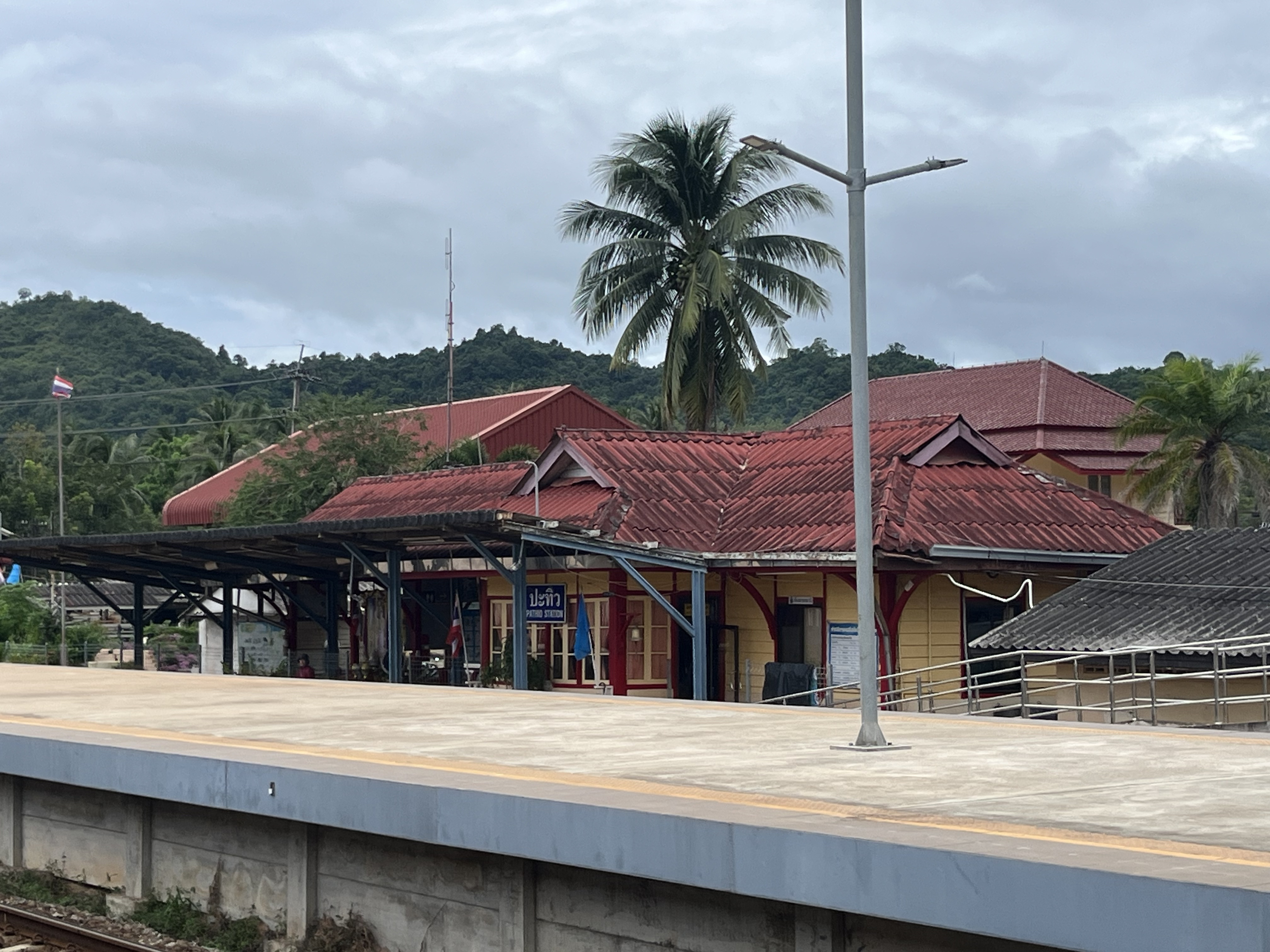
Former station building

== Train services ==
- Special Express No. 43/44 Bangkok-Surat Thani-Bangkok
- Special Express No. 39/40 Bangkok-Surat Thani-Bangkok
- Special Express No. 41/42 Bangkok-Yala-Bangkok
- Express No. 86 Nakhon Si Thammarat-Bangkok
- Rapid No. 167/168 Bangkok-Kantang-Bangkok
- Rapid No. 169/170 Bangkok-Yala-Bangkok
- Rapid No. 174 Nakhon Si Thammarat-Bangkok
- Rapid No. 177/178 Thon Buri-Lang Suan-Thon Buri
- Ordinary No. 254/255 Lang Suan-Thon Buri-Lang Suan
