= Saphli railway station =

Railway station in Thailand

Coordinates: 10.6096°N 99.2390°E

Saphli สะพลี
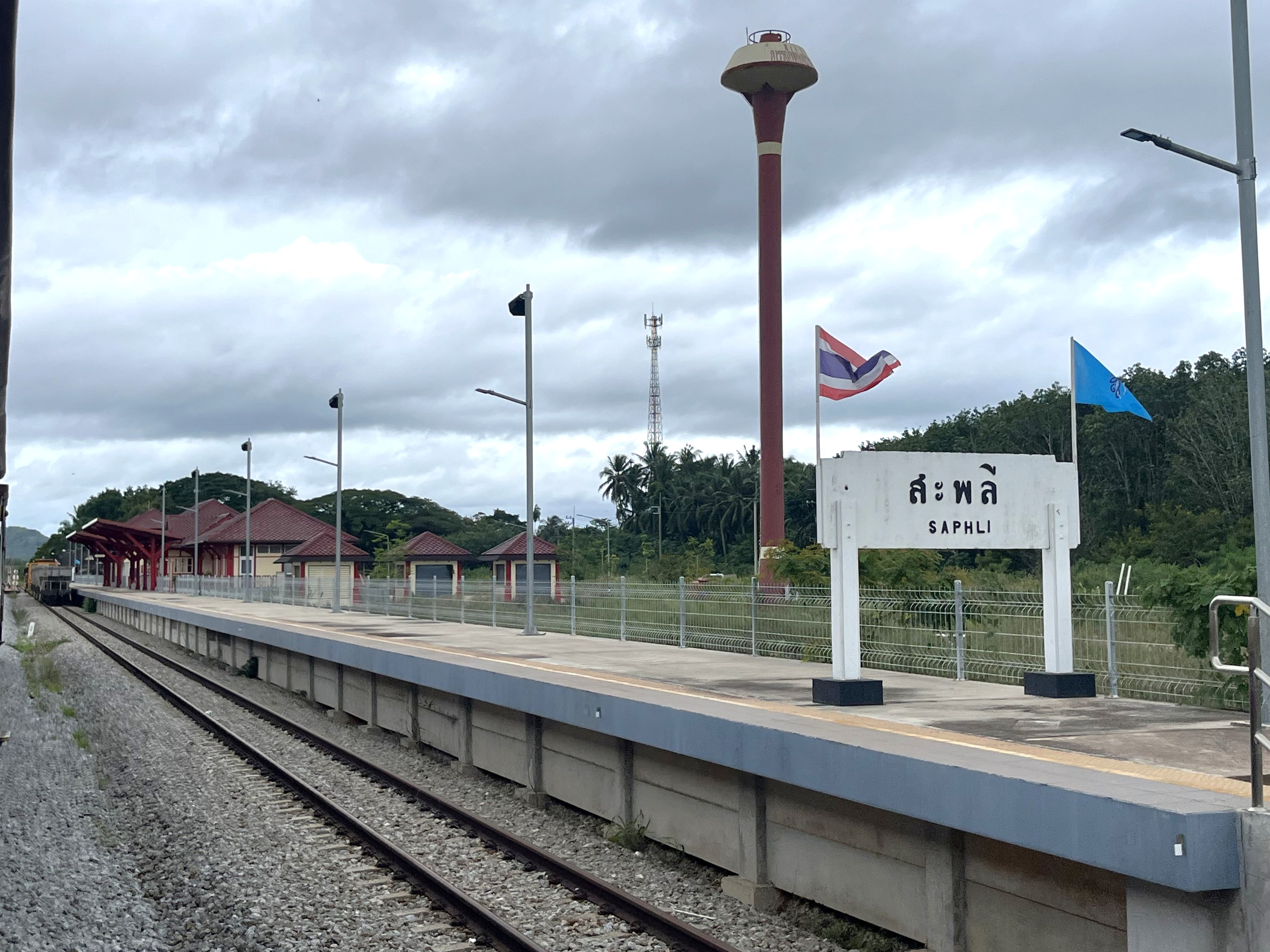
- Station in 2025

General information
- Location: National Highway No. 3180, Mu 7 (Ban Saphli), Saphli Subdistrict, Pathio District, Chumphon
- Owner: State Railway of Thailand
- Line: Southern Line
- Platforms: 1
- Tracks: 2

Other information
- Station code: สี.

Services
Preceding station	State Railway of Thailand	Following station
Ban Khok Ma towards Hua Lamphong or Krung Thep Aphiwat	Southern Line	Nong Nian Halt towards Su-ngai Kolok
Location

Saphli railway station is a railway station located in Saphli Subdistrict, Pathio District, Chumphon. It is a class 3 railway station located 453.8 km (282.0 mi) from Thon Buri railway station.

== Train services ==
- Ordinary 254/255 Lang Suan-Thon Buri-Lang Suan

== Gallery ==
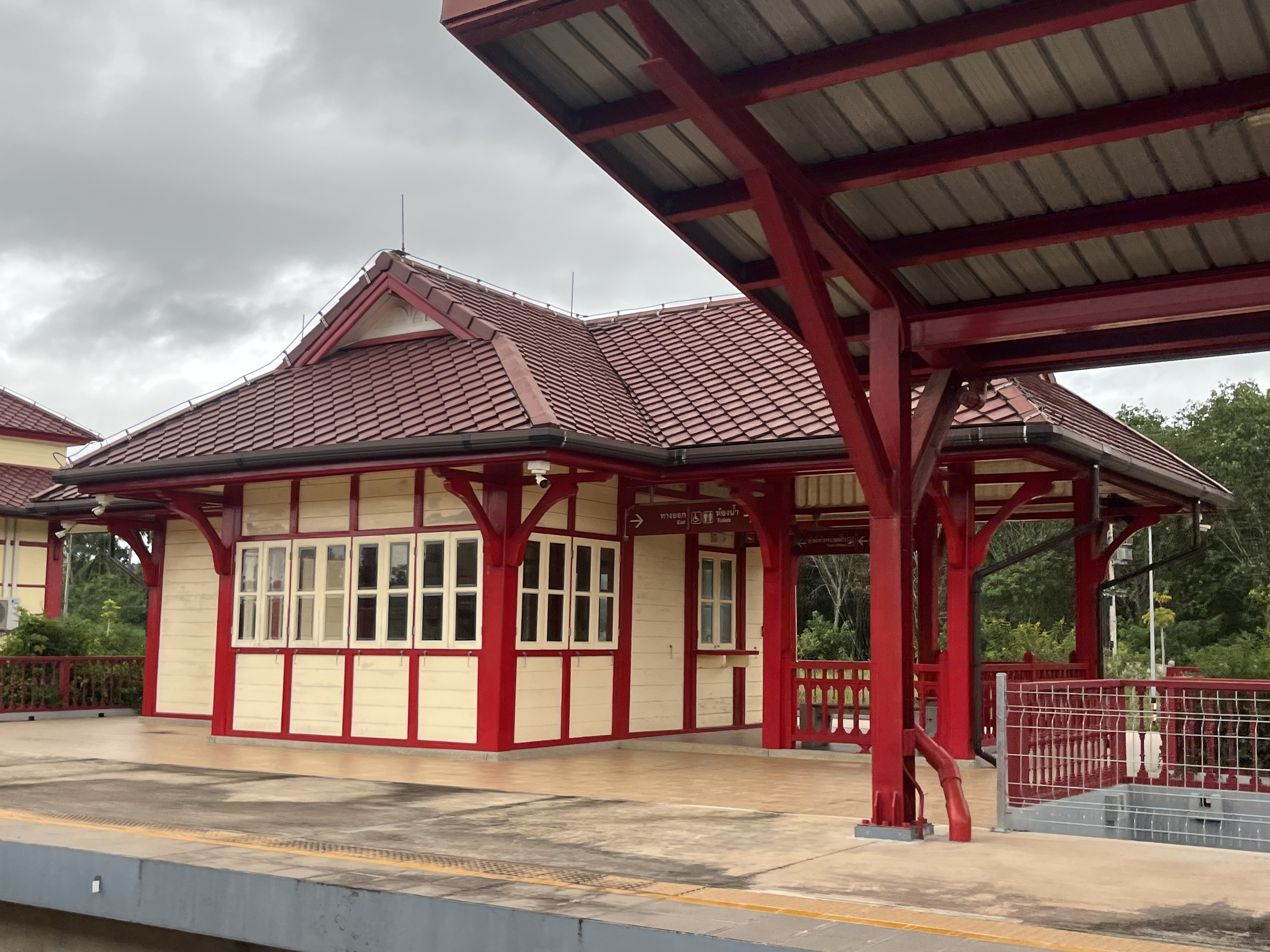
New station building

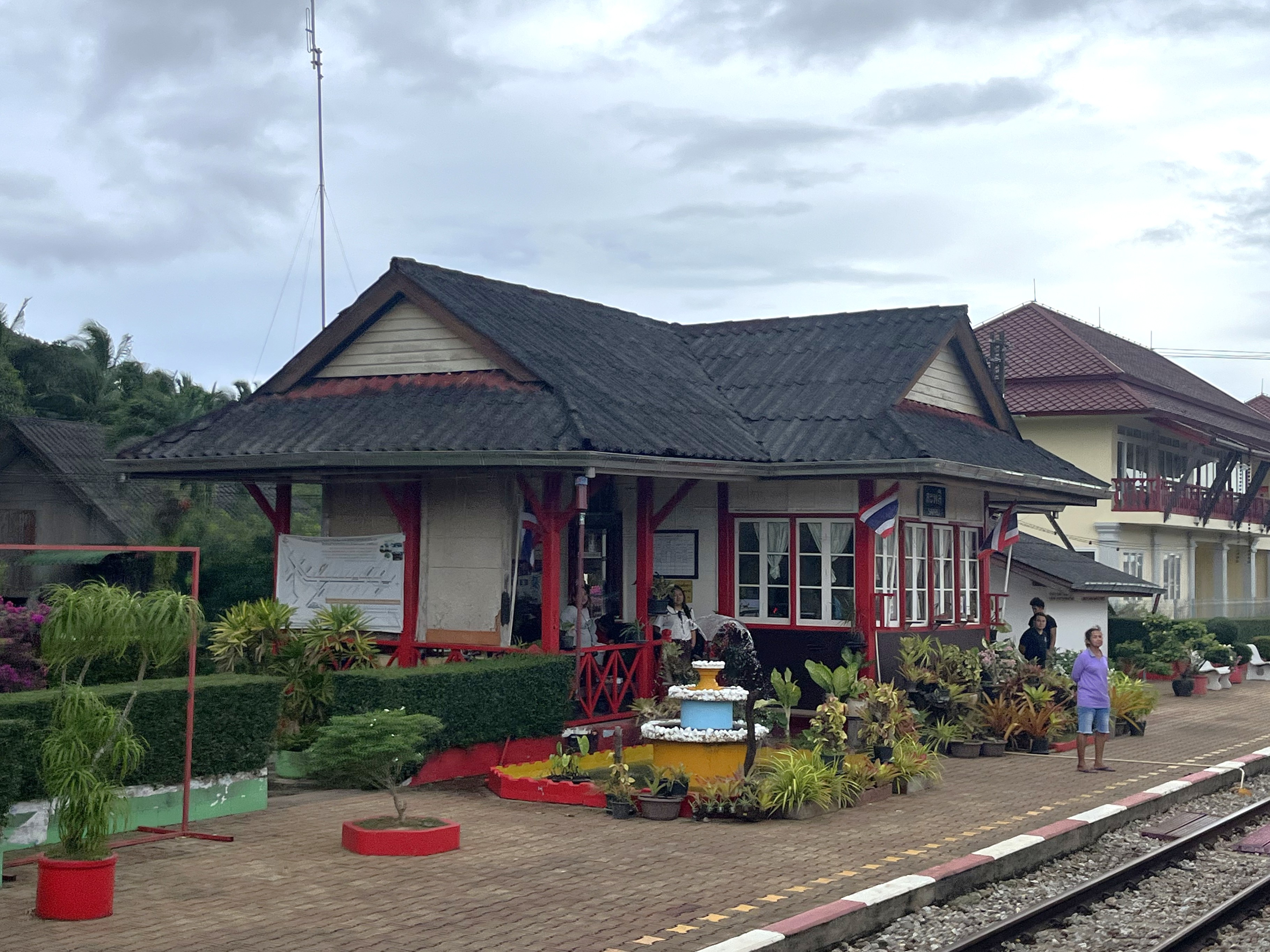
Former station building
