= Na Cha-ang railway station =

Railway station in Thailand

Coordinates: 10.5369°N 99.2085°E

Na Cha-ang นาชะอัง
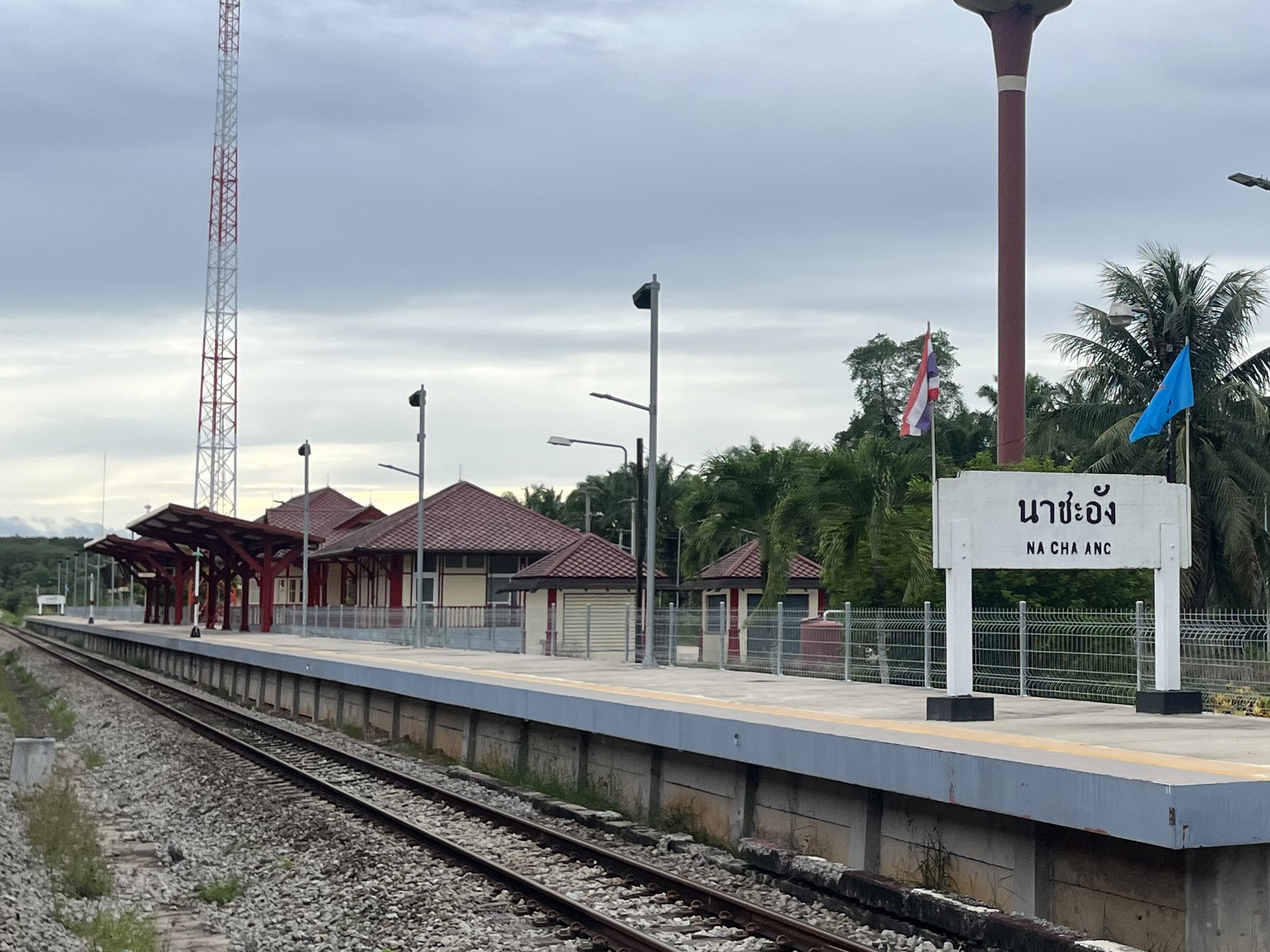
- Station in 2025

General information
- Location: Chumphon Local Road No. 3173, Mu 2 (Ban Na Cha-ang), Na Cha-ang Subdistrict, Chumphon City
- Owner: State Railway of Thailand
- Line: Southern Line
- Platforms: 1
- Tracks: 2

Other information
- Station code: ชง.

Services
| Preceding station | State Railway of Thailand | Following station |
|---|---|---|
| Nong Nian Halt towards Hua Lamphong or Krung Thep Aphiwat | Southern Line | Chumphon towards Su-ngai Kolok |
Location

Na Cha-ang railway station is a railway station located in Na Cha-ang Subdistrict, Chumphon City, Chumphon. It is a class 3 railway station located 463.2 km (287.8 mi) from Thon Buri railway station.

== Train services ==
- Ordinary 254/255 Lang Suan-Thon Buri-Lang Suan

== Gallery ==
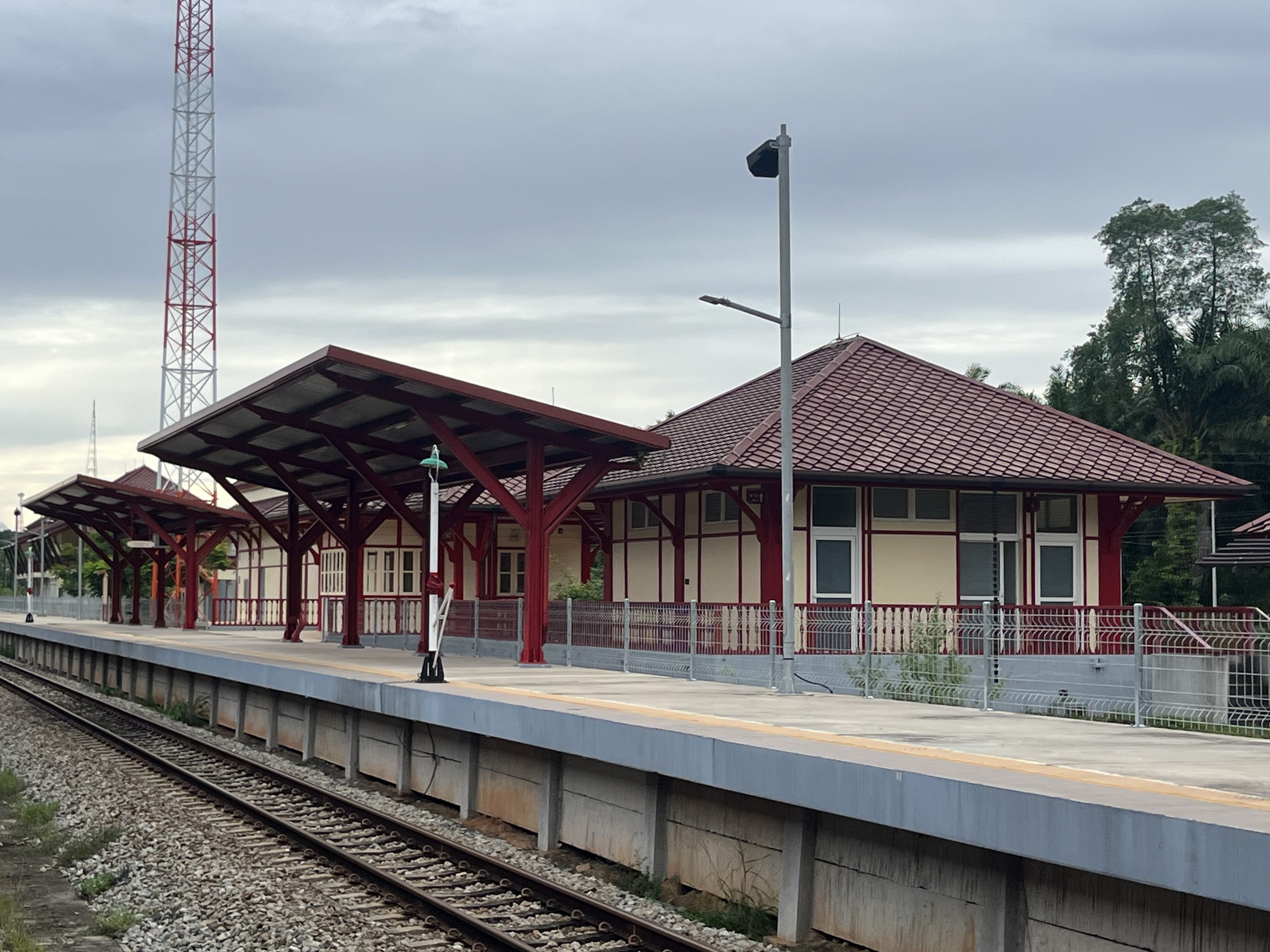
New station building

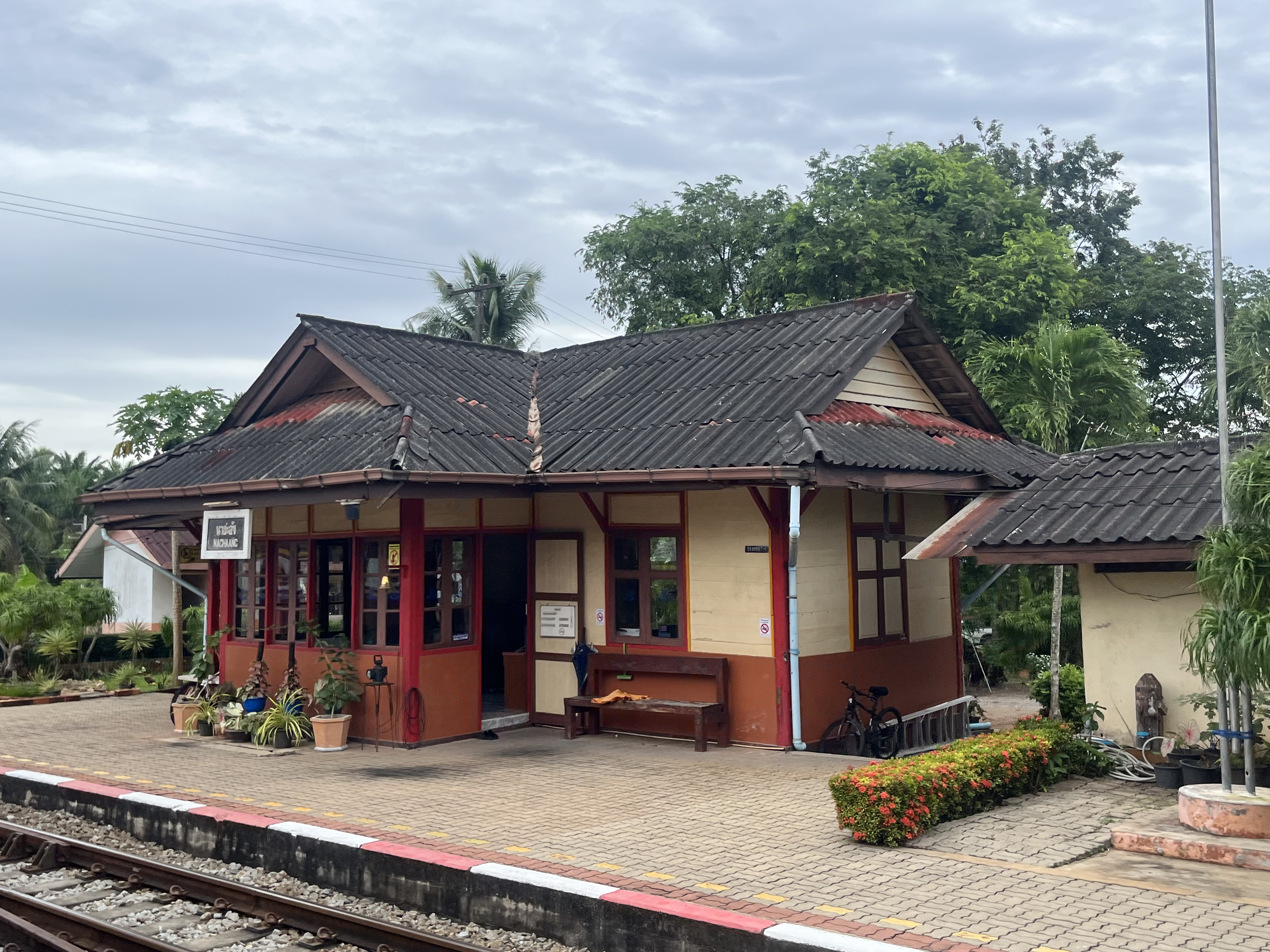
Former station building
