= Ban Khron railway halt =

Railway halt in Thailand

Coordinates: 10°16′49.5″N 99°5′47.3″E

Ban Khron บ้านครน
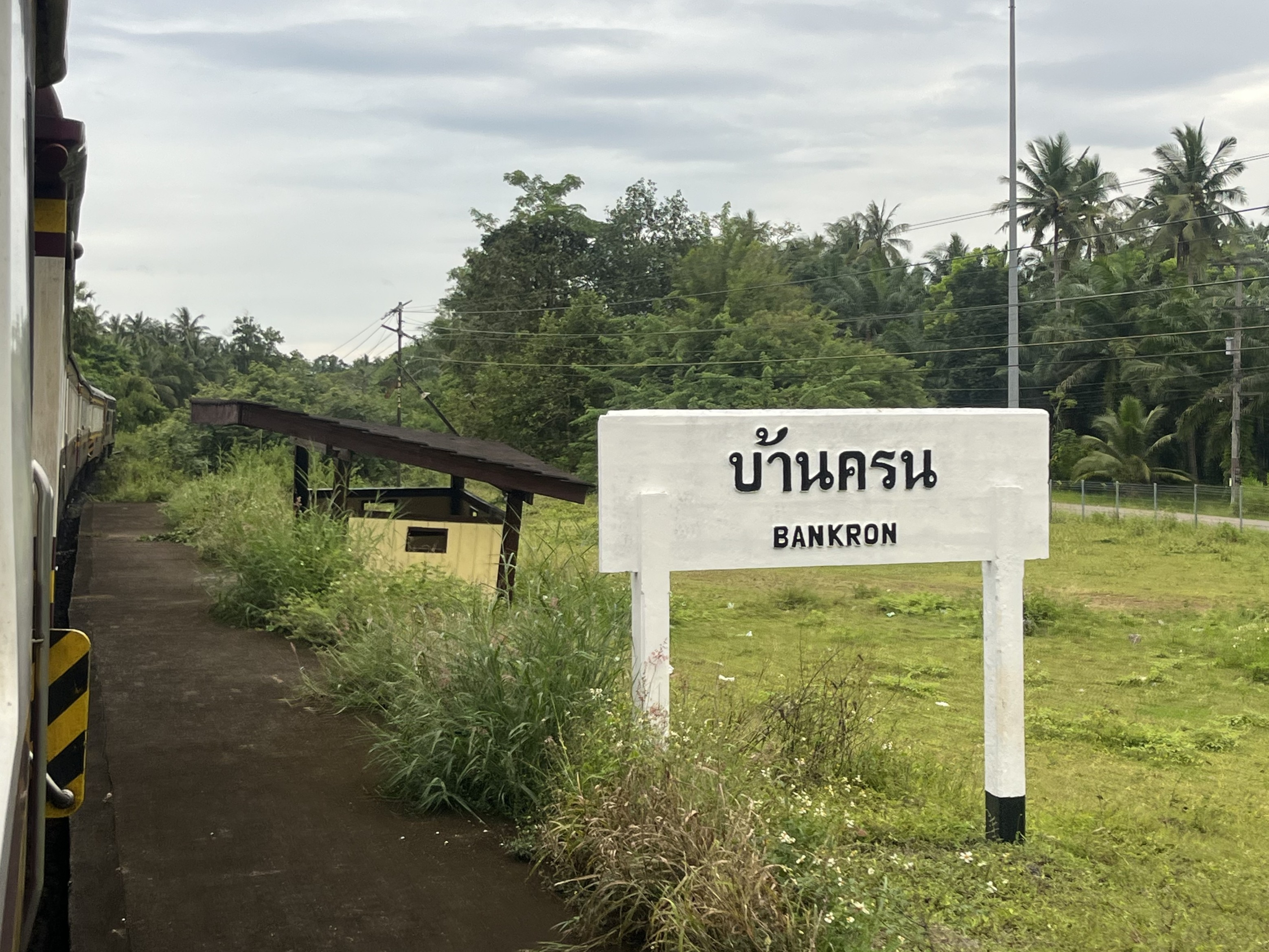

General information
- Location: Mu 3 (Ban Khron), Khron Subdistrict, Sawi District, Chumphon
- Owner: State Railway of Thailand
- Line: Southern Line
- Platforms: 1
- Tracks: 1

Other information
- Station code: คร.

Services
Preceding station	State Railway of Thailand	Following station
Wisai towards Hua Lamphong or Krung Thep Aphiwat	Southern Line	Sawi towards Su-ngai Kolok
Location

Ban Khron Halt (Thai: ที่หยุดรถบ้านครน) is a railway halt located in Khron Subdistrict, Sawi District, Chumphon in Thailand. It is located 495.757 km (308.0 mi) from Thon Buri Railway Station.

== Train services ==
- Ordinary No. 254/255 Lang Suan-Thon Buri-Lang Suan
- Local No. 445/446 Chumphon-Hat Yai Junction-Chumphon
