= Thung Kha railway station =

Railway station in Thailand

Coordinates: 10.4026°N 99.1374°E

Thung Kha ทุ่งคา
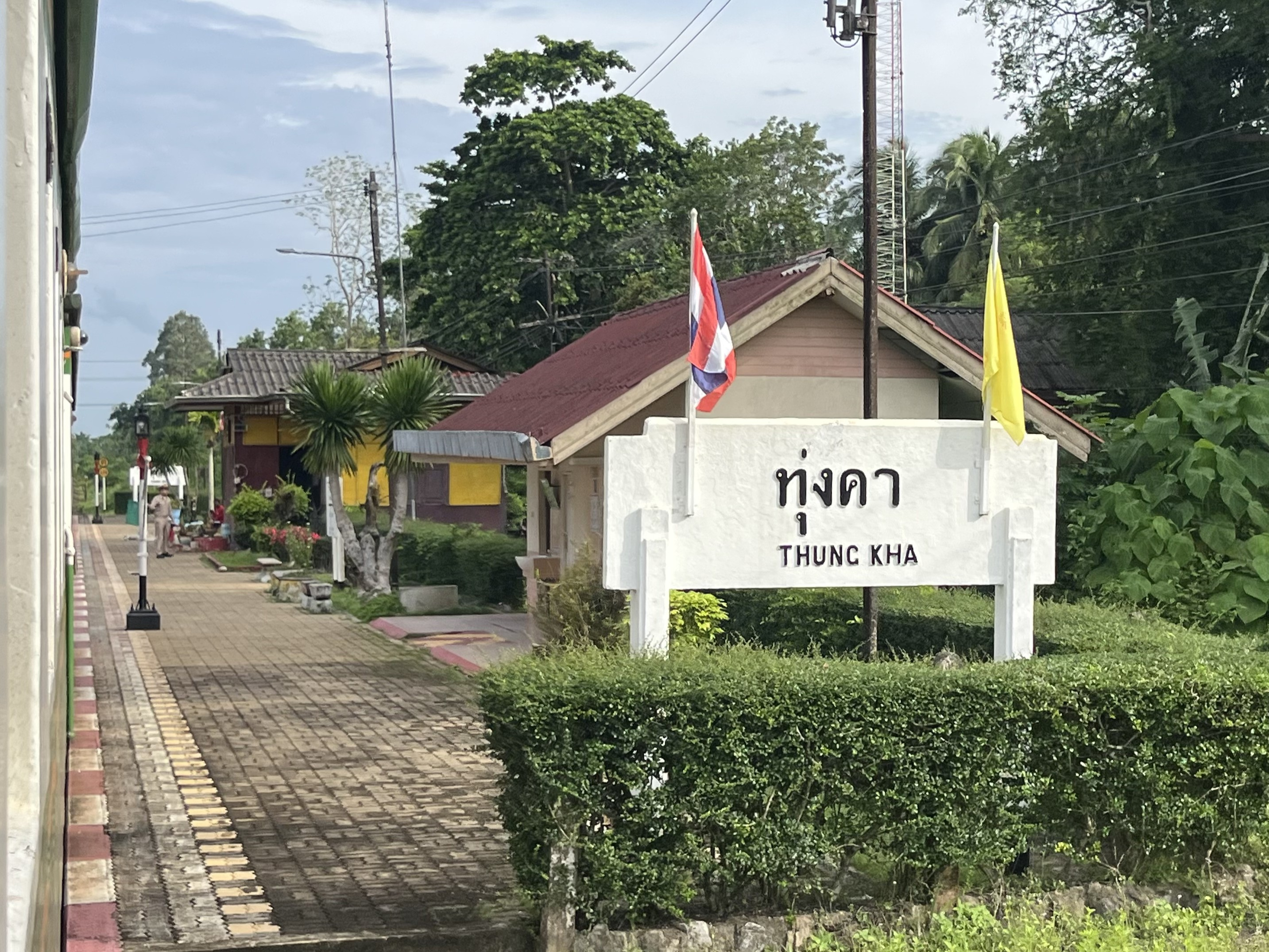

General information
- Location: Chumphon Local Road No. 2018, Mu 4 (Ban Thung Kha), Thung Kha Subdistrict, Chumphon City
- Owner: State Railway of Thailand
- Line: Southern Line
- Platforms: 1
- Tracks: 3

Other information
- Station code: ทค.

Services
Preceding station	State Railway of Thailand	Following station
Saeng Daet towards Hua Lamphong or Krung Thep Aphiwat	Southern Line	Wisai towards Su-ngai Kolok
Location

Thung Kha railway station is a railway station located in Thung Kha Subdistrict, Chumphon City, Chumphon. It is a class 3 railway station located 480.912 km (298.8 mi) from Thon Buri railway station.

== Train services ==
- Ordinary No. 254/255 Lang Suan-Thon Buri-Lang Suan
- Local No. 445/446 Chumphon-Hat Yai Junction-Chumphon

== Gallery ==
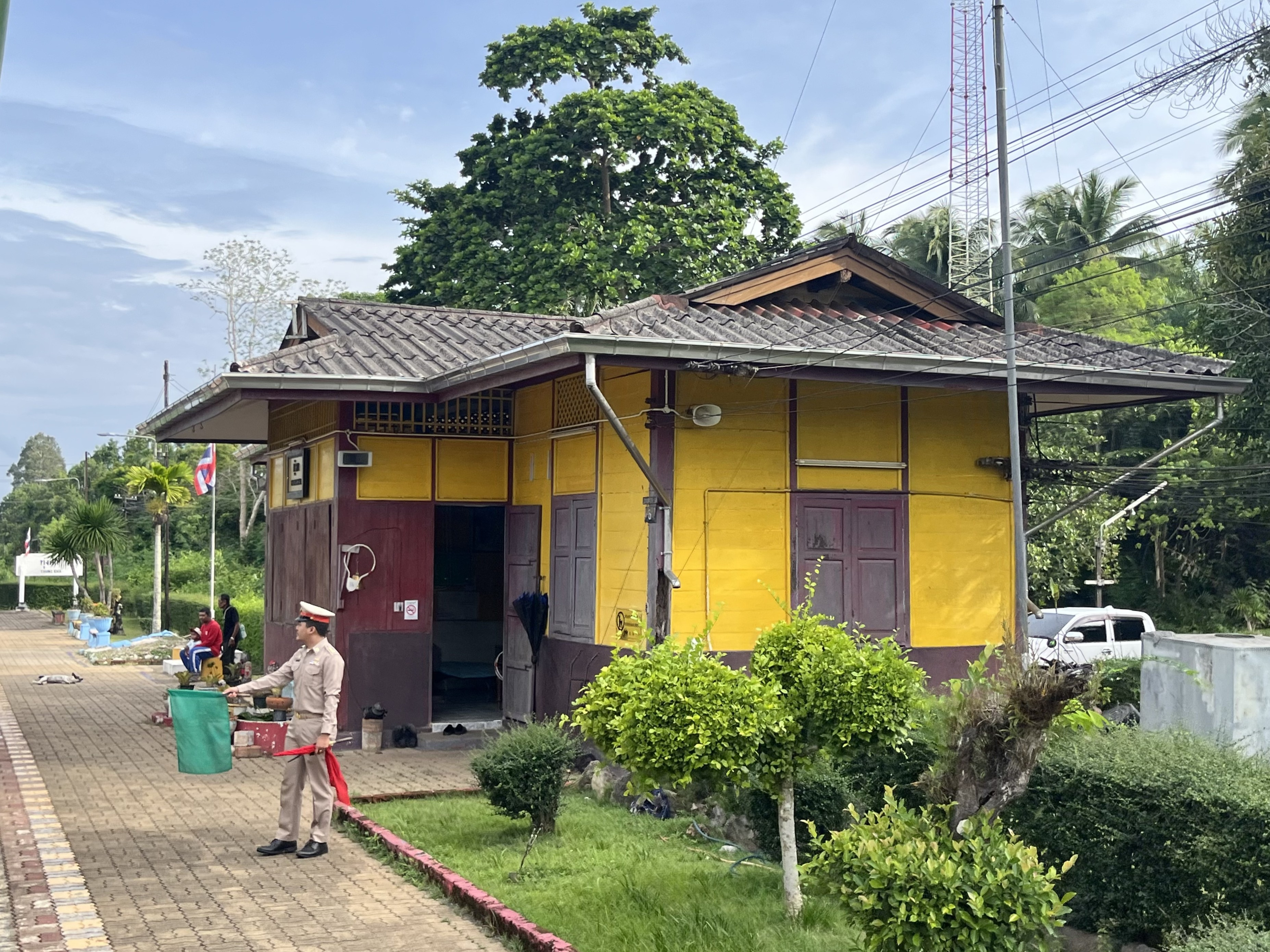
Station building
