= Wisai railway station =

Railway station in Chumphon, Thailand

Wisai วิสัย
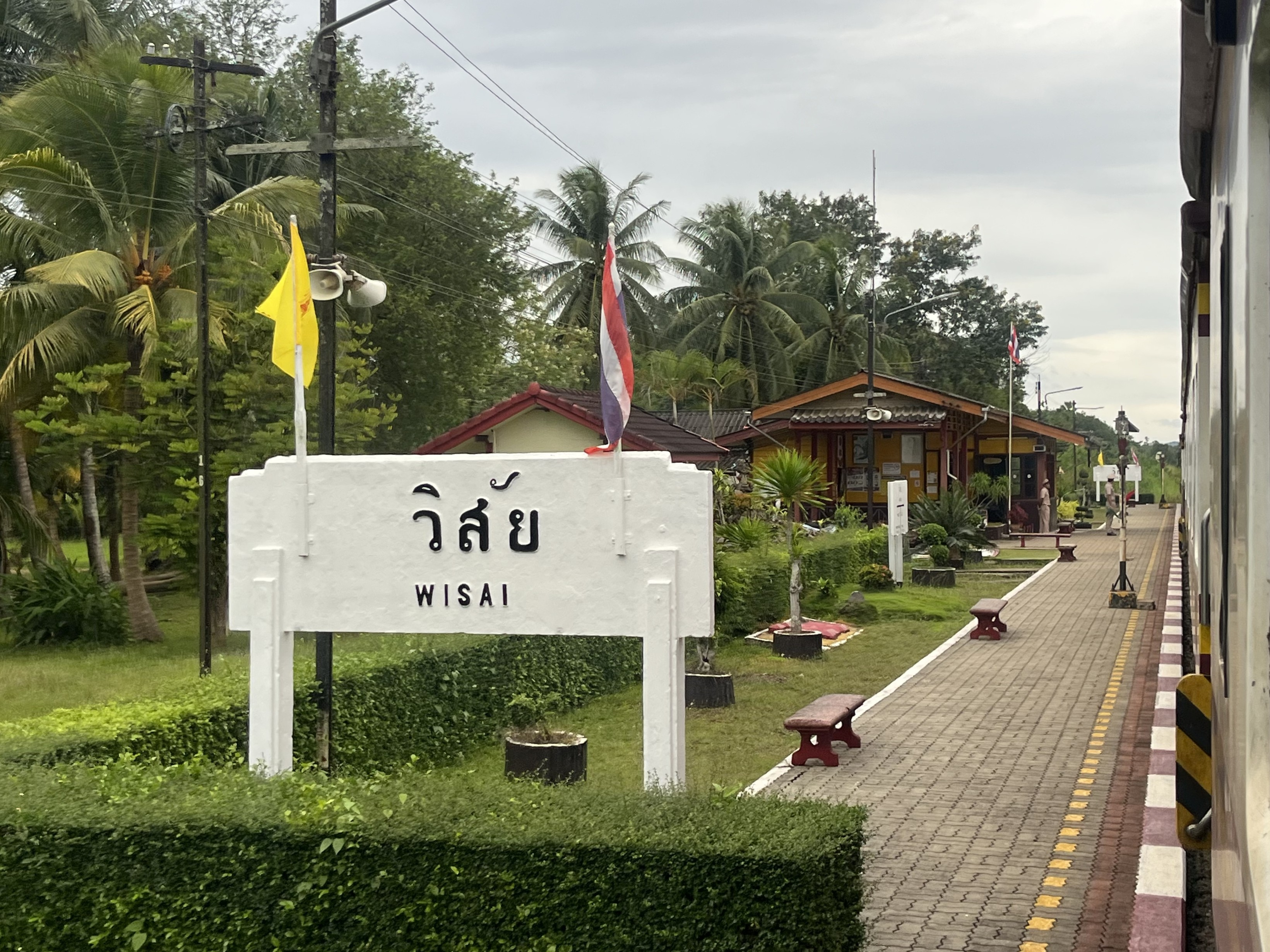

General information
- Location: Mu 1 (Ban Wisai), Wisai Nua Subdistrict, Chumphon City
- Coordinates: 10.3282°N 99.1116°E
- Owner: State Railway of Thailand
- Line: Southern Line
- Platforms: 1
- Tracks: 2

Other information
- Station code: ไส.

Services
Preceding station	State Railway of Thailand	Following station
Thung Kha towards Hua Lamphong or Krung Thep Aphiwat	Southern Line	Ban Khron Halt towards Su-ngai Kolok
Location

Wisai railway station is a railway station located in Wisai Nua Subdistrict, Chumphon City, Chumphon. It is a class 3 railway station located 489.978 km (304.5 mi) from Thon Buri railway station

== Train services ==
- Ordinary No. 254/255 Lang Suan-Thon Buri-Lang Suan
- Local No. 445/446 Chumphon-Hat Yai Junction-Chumphon

== Gallery ==
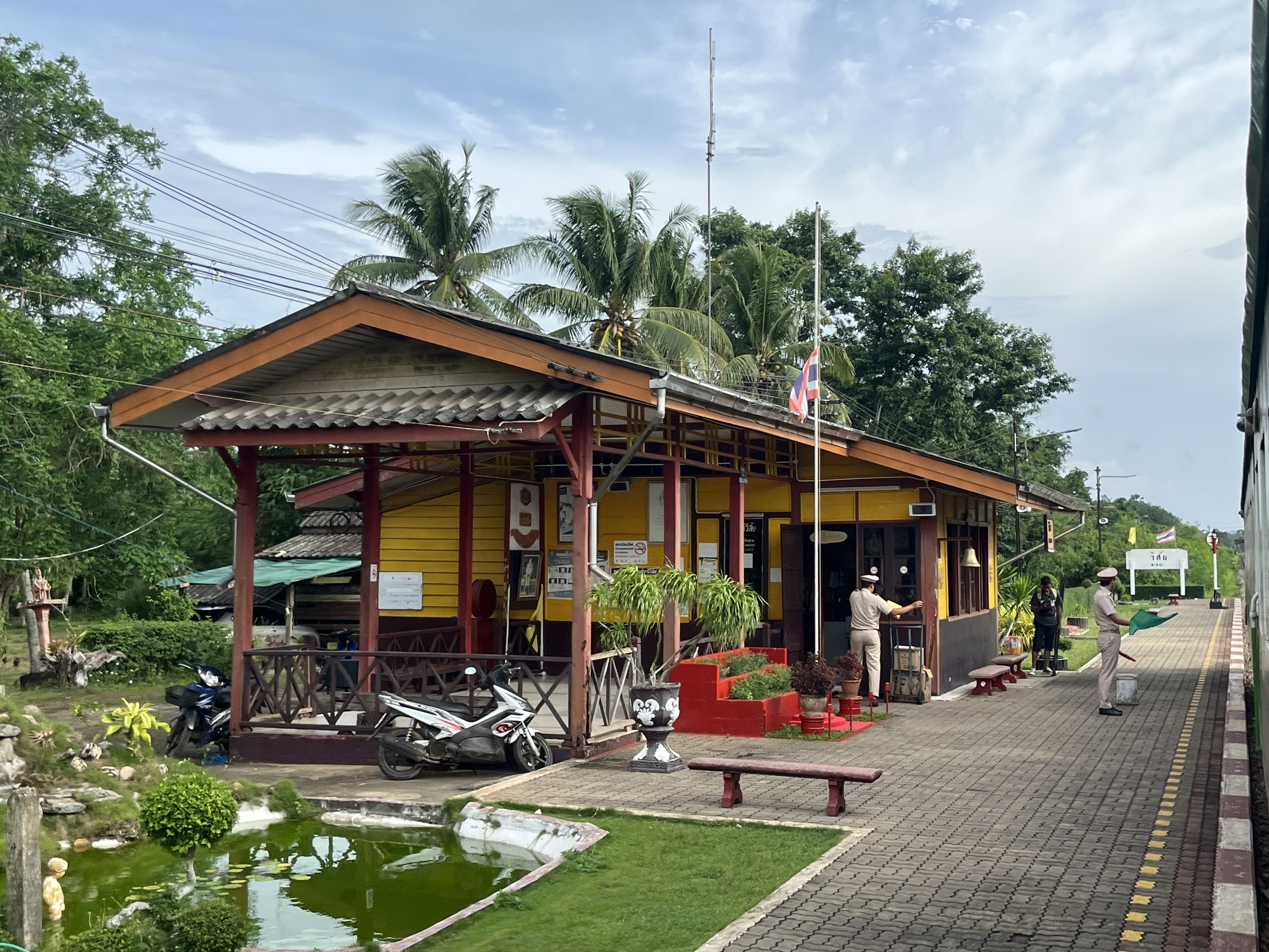
Station building
