= Saeng Daet railway station =

Railway station in Thailand

Coordinates: 10.4737°N 99.1553°E

Saeng Daet แสงแดด
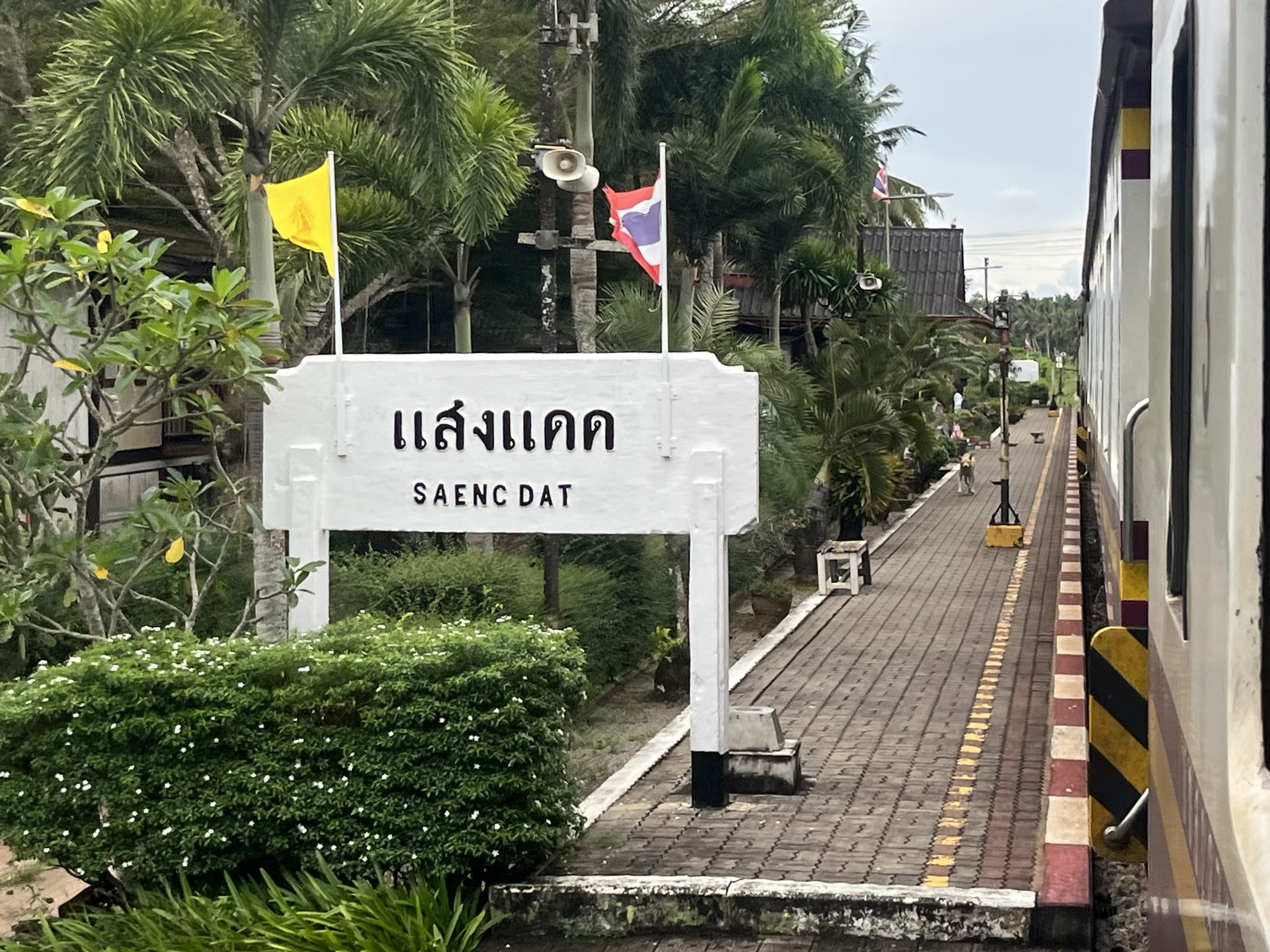

General information
- Location: Saiphatthanakit Road, Tak Daet Subdistrict, Chumphon City
- Owner: State Railway of Thailand
- Line: Southern Line
- Platforms: 1
- Tracks: 2

Other information
- Station code: สด.

Services
| Preceding station | State Railway of Thailand | Following station |
|---|---|---|
| Chumphon towards Hua Lamphong or Krung Thep Aphiwat | Southern Line | Thung Kha towards Su-ngai Kolok |
Location

Saeng Daet railway station is a railway station located in Tak Daet Subdistrict, Chumphon City, Chumphon. It is a class 3 railway station located 472.548 km (293.6 mi) from Thon Buri railway station.

== Train services ==
- Ordinary No. 254/255 Lang Suan-Thon Buri-Lang Suan
- Local No. 445/446 Chumphon-Hat Yai Junction-Chumphon

== Gallery ==
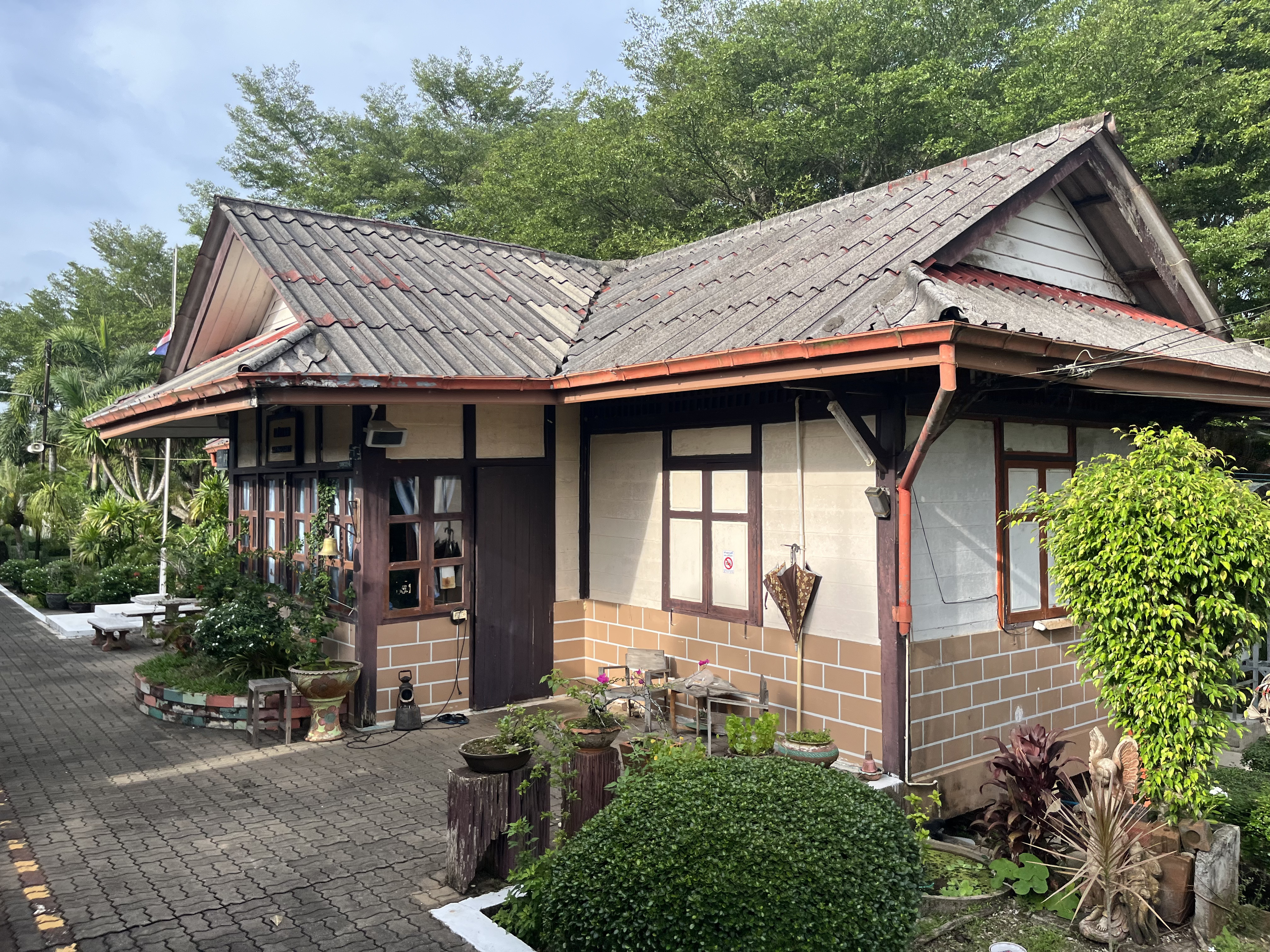
Station building
