= Sawi railway station =

Railway station in Thailand

Coordinates: 10.2363°N 99.1048°E

Sawi สวี
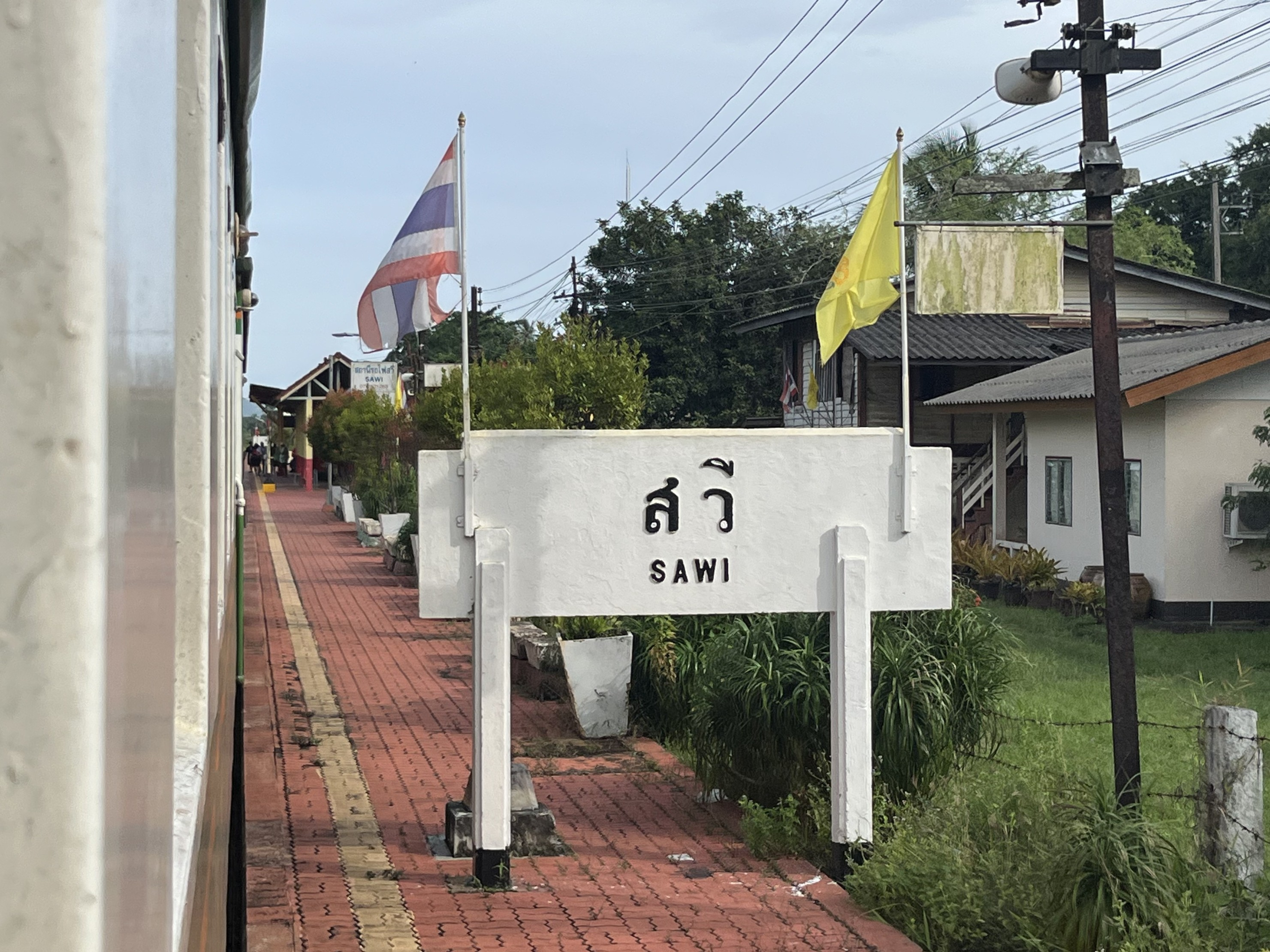

General information
- Location: Na Pho Subdistrict, Sawi District, Chumphon
- Owner: State Railway of Thailand
- Line: Southern Line
- Platforms: 1
- Tracks: 3

Other information
- Station code: ะว.

Services
Preceding station	State Railway of Thailand	Following station
Ban Khron Halt towards Hua Lamphong or Krung Thep Aphiwat	Southern Line	Khao Suan Thurian towards Su-ngai Kolok
Location

Sawi railway station is a railway station located in Na Pho Subdistrict, Sawi District, Chumphon. It is a class 2 railway station located 500.769 km (311.2 mi) from Bangkok railway station. It is the railway station with the shortest name in Thailand.

== Train services ==
- Special Express 43/44 Bangkok-Surat Thani-Bangkok
- Special Express 39/40 Bangkok-Surat Thani-Bangkok
- Special Express 41/42 Bangkok-Yala-Bangkok
- Rapid 171/172 Bangkok-Sungai Kolok-Bangkok
- Rapid 173/174 Bangkok-Nakhon Si Thammarat-Bangkok
- Rapid 167/168 Bangkok-Kantang-Bangkok
- Rapid 177/178 Thon Buri-Lang Suan-Thon Buri
- Ordinary 254/255 Lang Suan-Thon Buri-Lang Suan
- Local 445/446 Chumphon-Hat Yai Junction-Chumphon
