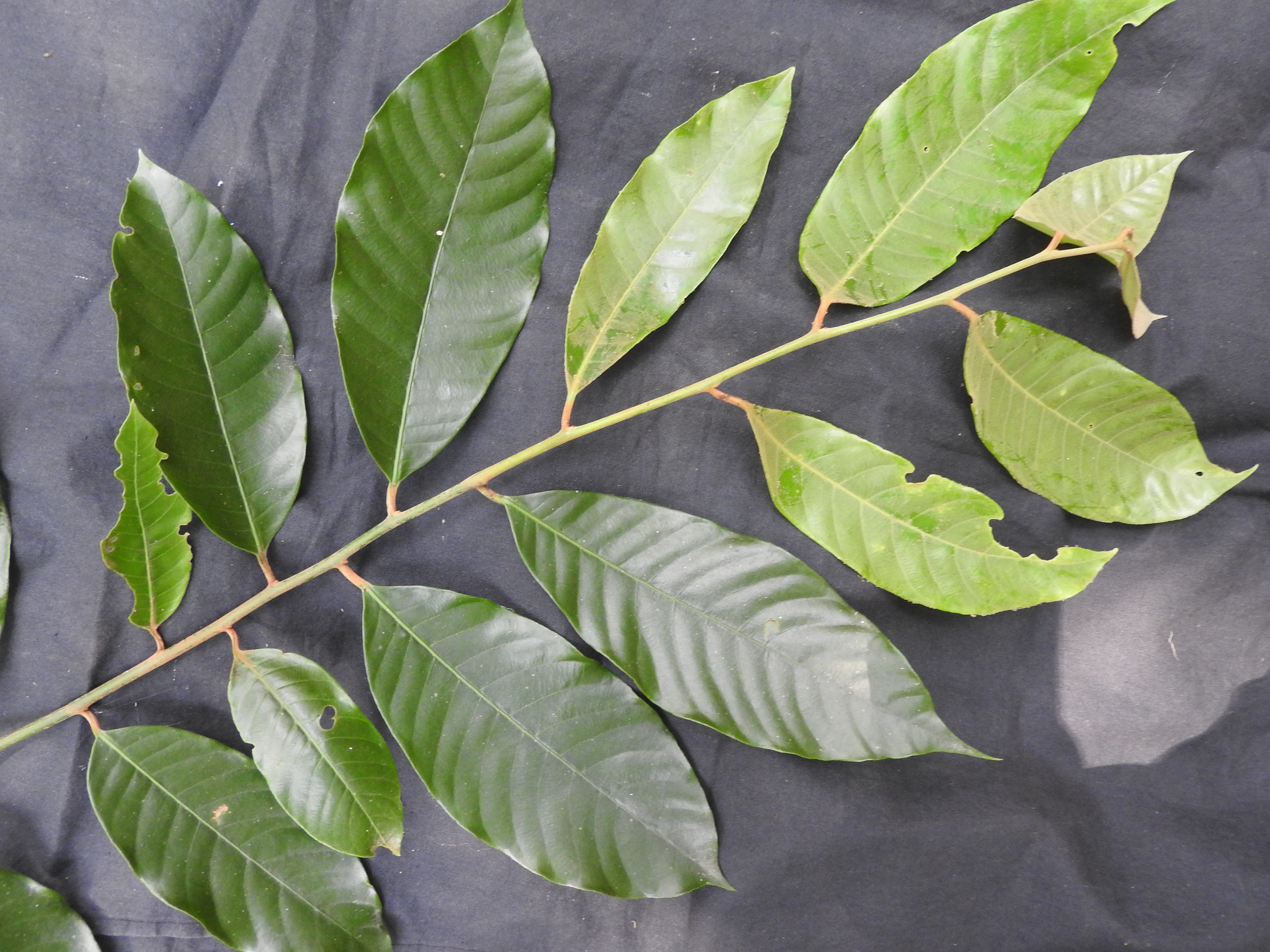
- Myristica malabarica leaves
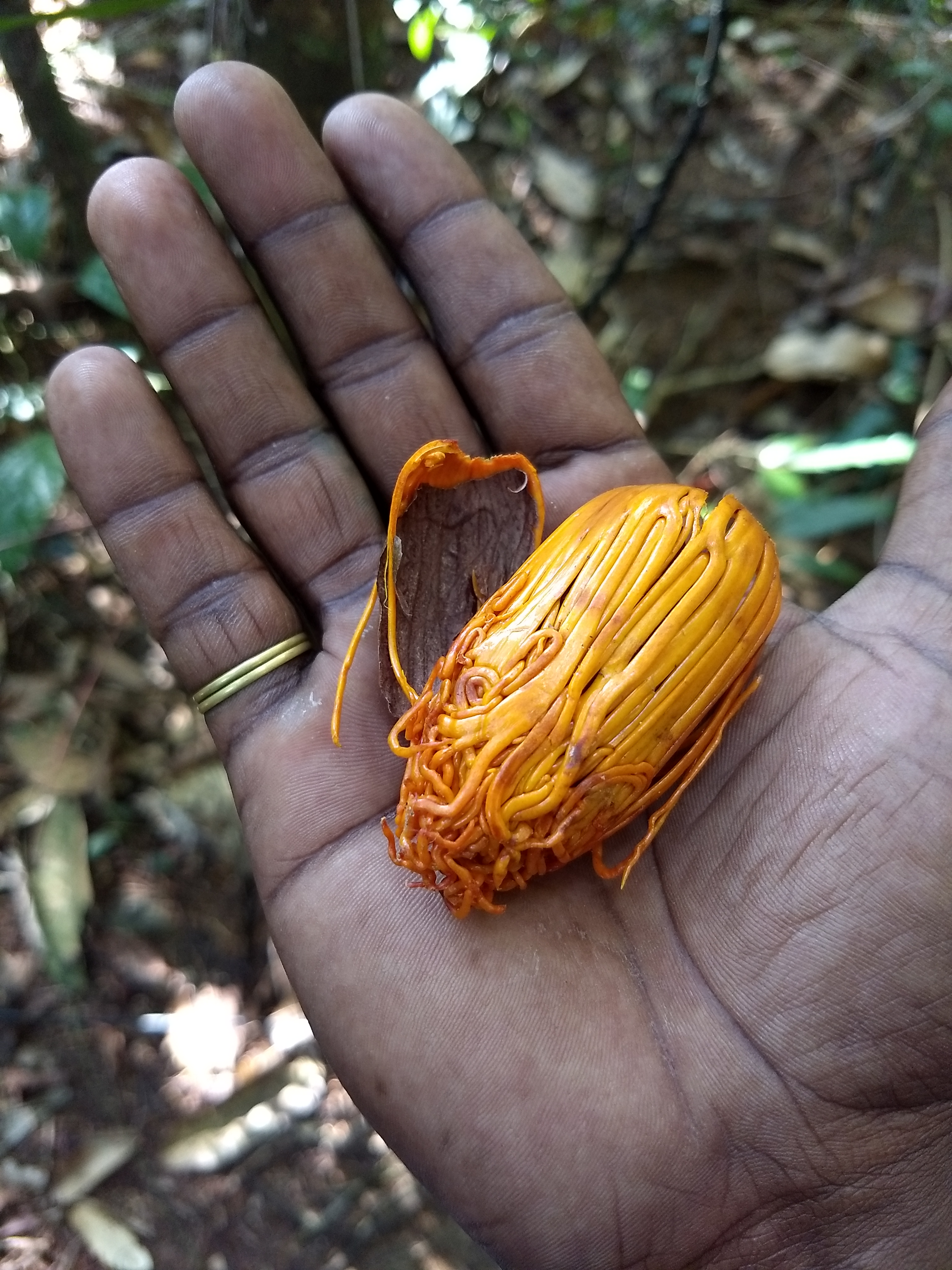
- Fruits of Myristica malabarica

Conservation status
- Vulnerable (IUCN 2.3)

Scientific classification
- Kingdom: Plantae
- Clade: Embryophytes
- Clade: Tracheophytes
- Clade: Angiosperms
- Clade: Magnoliids
- Order: Magnoliales
- Family: Myristicaceae
- Genus: Myristica
- Species: M. malabarica

Binomial name
- Myristica malabarica Lam.

Synonyms
- Myristica dactyloides Wall.; Myristica notha Wall.; Myristica tomentosa J.Graham; Palala malabarica (Lam.) Kuntze

= Myristica malabarica =

Species of flowering plant

Myristica malabarica is a species of flowering plant in the family Myristicaceae. It is a tree native to India, Bangladesh, and Myanmar, including the Western Ghats in southwestern India. It is threatened by habitat loss according to the IUCN Red List. It can reach 25 m in height and its bark is smooth and greenish-black or sometimes reddish.

Names in local languages: Kattujathi (literally wild nutmeg), Kattujathikka, Kottappannu, Panampalka, Pathiripoovu, Ponnampannu, Ponnampayin, and Ponnampu in Malayalam; Kanage, and Doddajajikai in Kannada; Rampatri in Hindi.

It is used in Ayurvedic medicine. M. malabarica is used to adulterate true nutmeg, which comes from Myristica fragrans.

Both Myristica magnifica and M. malabarica are endangered trees that are native to Western Ghats. The swamp lands and lowlands where they normally grow have been significantly drained for agricultural use.

The species was described by Jean-Baptiste Lamarck in 1791.

In popular culture, students in Kerala organize an ecological festival called Myristica, named after the species found in the region, in order to raise awareness about biodiversity conservation.
