= M. magnifica =

M. magnifica may refer to:

- Mitra magnifica, a sea snail species
- Myristica magnifica, a plant species endemic to India
