= M. philippensis =

M. philippensis may refer to:

- Mallotus philippensis, the kamala or red kamala, a tree species found in south east Asia
- Myristica philippensis, a plant species endemic to the Philippines
