= Myristica polyantha =

Myristica polyantha is a taxonomic synonym for two species of plants:

- Myristica polyantha (Warb.) Boerl., a synonym of Horsfieldia laevigata var. laevigata
- Myristica polyantha W.J.de Wilde, a synonym of Myristica johnsii
