= Myristica psilocarpa =

Conservation status
- Endangered (IUCN 3.1)

Scientific classification
- Kingdom: Plantae
- Clade: Tracheophytes
- Clade: Angiosperms
- Clade: Magnoliids
- Order: Magnoliales
- Family: Myristicaceae
- Genus: Myristica
- Species: M. psilocarpa

Binomial name
- Myristica psilocarpa W.J.de Wilde

Species of flowering plant

Myristica psilocarpa is a species of plant in the Myristicaceae. It is endemic to Manus Island, Papua New Guinea. The conservation status of this plant is listed as vulnerable on the IUCN Red List. The plant grows in lowland rainforest.
