= Myristica devogelii =

Conservation status
- Vulnerable (IUCN 3.1)

Scientific classification
- Kingdom: Plantae
- Clade: Embryophytes
- Clade: Tracheophytes
- Clade: Spermatophytes
- Clade: Angiosperms
- Clade: Magnoliids
- Order: Magnoliales
- Family: Myristicaceae
- Genus: Myristica
- Species: M. devogelii

Binomial name
- Myristica devogelii W.J. de Wilde

Species of tree

Myristica devogelii is a species of flowering plant in the family Myristicaceae. It is a tree endemic to central Sulawesi in Indonesia. It is known from around Lake Matano, where it grows in lowland rain forest at about 400 metres elevation.
