= Myristica sangowoensis =

Conservation status
- Least Concern (IUCN 3.1)

Scientific classification
- Kingdom: Plantae
- Clade: Embryophytes
- Clade: Tracheophytes
- Clade: Spermatophytes
- Clade: Angiosperms
- Clade: Magnoliids
- Order: Magnoliales
- Family: Myristicaceae
- Genus: Myristica
- Species: M. sangowoensis

Binomial name
- Myristica sangowoensis (J.Sinclair) W.J.de Wilde

Synonyms
- Myristica fatua var. sangowoensis J.Sinclair

Species of tree

Myristica sangowoensis is a species of flowering plant in the family Myristicaceae. It is a tree endemic to Maluku in Indonesia.
