= Myristica nana =

Conservation status
- Endangered (IUCN 3.1)

Scientific classification
- Kingdom: Plantae
- Clade: Tracheophytes
- Clade: Angiosperms
- Clade: Magnoliids
- Order: Magnoliales
- Family: Myristicaceae
- Genus: Myristica
- Species: M. nana

Binomial name
- Myristica nana W.J.de Wilde

Species of flowering plant

Myristica nana is a species of flowering plant in the family Myristicaceae. It is a shrub or small tree endemic to the Papuan Peninsula of eastern Papua New Guinea. It grows 2 to 7 metres tall, and flowers and fruits in July and August. It grows in flatland and steep slopes in lowland rain forest from 400 to 750 metres elevation.
