= Myristica perlaevis =

Conservation status
- Least Concern (IUCN 3.1)

Scientific classification
- Kingdom: Plantae
- Clade: Embryophytes
- Clade: Tracheophytes
- Clade: Spermatophytes
- Clade: Angiosperms
- Clade: Magnoliids
- Order: Magnoliales
- Family: Myristicaceae
- Genus: Myristica
- Species: M. perlaevis

Binomial name
- Myristica perlaevis W.J.de Wilde

Species of tree

Myristica perlaevis is a species of plant in the family Myristicaceae. It is a tree endemic to Seram in the Maluku Islands of Indonesia.
