= Myristica millepunctata =

Conservation status
- Vulnerable (IUCN 3.1)

Scientific classification
- Kingdom: Plantae
- Clade: Embryophytes
- Clade: Tracheophytes
- Clade: Spermatophytes
- Clade: Angiosperms
- Clade: Magnoliids
- Order: Magnoliales
- Family: Myristicaceae
- Genus: Myristica
- Species: M. millepunctata

Binomial name
- Myristica millepunctata W.J.de Wilde

Species of flowering plant

Myristica millepunctata is a species of plant in the family Myristicaceae. It is a tree endemic to the Central Highlands of New Guinea in Western New Guinea and Papua New Guinea. It is a tall tree which grows 30 to 40 metres tall. It grows in montane and ridge rain forest from 1,400 to 1,570 metres elevation.
