= Myristica lowiana =

Conservation status
- Near Threatened (IUCN 2.3)

Scientific classification
- Kingdom: Plantae
- Clade: Tracheophytes
- Clade: Angiosperms
- Clade: Magnoliids
- Order: Magnoliales
- Family: Myristicaceae
- Genus: Myristica
- Species: M. lowiana

Binomial name
- Myristica lowiana King

Synonyms
- Myristica hackenbergii Diels

Species of tree

Myristica lowiana is a species of flowering plant in the family Myristicaceae. It is a tree found in Sumatra, Singapore, Peninsular Malaysia and Borneo.
