= Myristica colinridsdalei =

Conservation status
- Critically Endangered (IUCN 3.1)

Scientific classification
- Kingdom: Plantae
- Clade: Embryophytes
- Clade: Tracheophytes
- Clade: Spermatophytes
- Clade: Angiosperms
- Clade: Magnoliids
- Order: Magnoliales
- Family: Myristicaceae
- Genus: Myristica
- Species: M. colinridsdalei

Binomial name
- Myristica colinridsdalei W.J. de Wilde

Species of flowering plant

Myristica colinridsdalei is a species of flowering plant in the family Myristicaceae. It is a tree endemic northeastern Luzon to the Philippines.
