= Myristica coacta =

Conservation status
- Critically Endangered (IUCN 3.1)

Scientific classification
- Kingdom: Plantae
- Clade: Embryophytes
- Clade: Tracheophytes
- Clade: Spermatophytes
- Clade: Angiosperms
- Clade: Magnoliids
- Order: Magnoliales
- Family: Myristicaceae
- Genus: Myristica
- Species: M. coacta

Binomial name
- Myristica coacta W.J.de Wilde

Species of flowering plant

Myristica coacta is a species of flowering plant in the family Myristicaceae. It is a tree endemic to New Guinea. It is a small tree which grows up to 10 metres tall. It is known from a single location at Oksapmin in Sandaun Province of Papua New Guinea, where it grows in degraded montane Fagaceous rain forest from 1,800 to 2,000 metres elevation.
