= Myristica guatteriifolia =

Conservation status
- Least Concern (IUCN 3.1)

Scientific classification
- Kingdom: Plantae
- Clade: Embryophytes
- Clade: Tracheophytes
- Clade: Spermatophytes
- Clade: Angiosperms
- Clade: Magnoliids
- Order: Magnoliales
- Family: Myristicaceae
- Genus: Myristica
- Species: M. guatteriifolia

Binomial name
- Myristica guatteriifolia A.DC.

Synonyms
- Myristica cookii Warb.; Myristica litoralis Miq.; Myristica palawanensis Merr.; Myristica riedelii Warb.; Palala guatteriifolia (A.DC.) Kuntze; Palala litoralis (Miq.) Kuntze

Species of tree

Myristica guatteriifolia is a species of flowering plant in the family Myristicaceae. It is a tree native to Borneo, Java, the Lesser Sunda Islands, Myanmar, Peninsular Malaysia, the Philippines, Sumatra, and Vietnam.
