= Myristica teysmannii =

Conservation status
- Endangered (IUCN 2.3)

Scientific classification
- Kingdom: Plantae
- Clade: Embryophytes
- Clade: Tracheophytes
- Clade: Spermatophytes
- Clade: Angiosperms
- Clade: Magnoliids
- Order: Magnoliales
- Family: Myristicaceae
- Genus: Myristica
- Species: M. teysmannii

Binomial name
- Myristica teysmannii Miq.

Synonyms
- Myristica hyposticta Miq.; Palala hyposticta (Miq.) Kuntze; Palala teysmannii (Miq.) Kuntze

Species of tree

Myristica teysmannii is a species of plant in the family Myristicaceae. It is a tree endemic to central and eastern Java in Indonesia. It is threatened by habitat loss.
