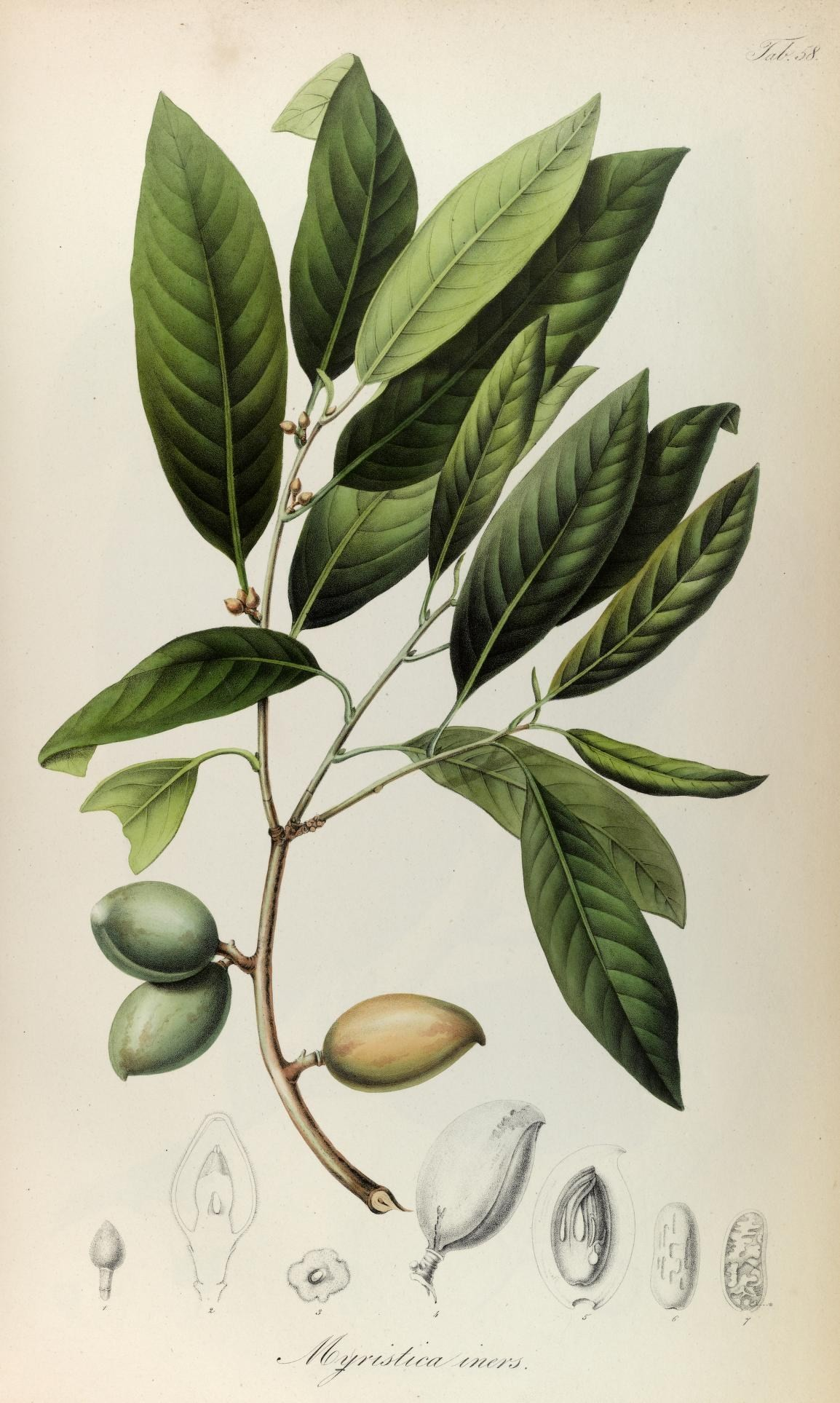
- Illustration of Myristica iners

Conservation status
- Least Concern (IUCN 3.1)

Scientific classification
- Kingdom: Plantae
- Clade: Embryophytes
- Clade: Tracheophytes
- Clade: Spermatophytes
- Clade: Angiosperms
- Clade: Magnoliids
- Order: Magnoliales
- Family: Myristicaceae
- Genus: Myristica
- Species: M. iners

Binomial name
- Myristica iners Blume

Synonyms
- Myristica cumingii var. floribunda Airy Shaw; Myristica heritierifolia Pierre ex Lecomte; Myristica sublanceolata Miq.; Myristica umbellata Elmer, nom. illeg. homonym. post.; Myristica vordermannii Warb.; Palala iners (Blume) Kuntze; Palala sublanceolata Kuntze

= Myristica iners =

Species of tree

Myristica iners is a species of flowering plant in the family Myristicaceae. It is a tree native to Cambodia, Thailand, and Vietnam in Indochina and to Borneo, Java, Peninsular Malaysia, the Philippines, and Sumatra in Malesia.
