= Myristica grandifolia =

Conservation status
- Least Concern (IUCN 3.1)

Scientific classification
- Kingdom: Plantae
- Clade: Embryophytes
- Clade: Tracheophytes
- Clade: Spermatophytes
- Clade: Angiosperms
- Clade: Magnoliids
- Order: Magnoliales
- Family: Myristicaceae
- Genus: Myristica
- Species: M. grandifolia

Binomial name
- Myristica grandifolia A.DC.

Synonyms
- Myristica macrophylla A.Gray, nom. illeg. homonym. post.; Palala grandifolia Kuntze

Species of flowering plant

Myristica grandifolia is a species of flowering plant in the family Myristicaceae. It is a tree endemic to Fiji.
