= Myristica depressa =

Conservation status
- Near Threatened (IUCN 2.3)

Scientific classification
- Kingdom: Plantae
- Clade: Embryophytes
- Clade: Tracheophytes
- Clade: Spermatophytes
- Clade: Angiosperms
- Clade: Magnoliids
- Order: Magnoliales
- Family: Myristicaceae
- Genus: Myristica
- Species: M. depressa

Binomial name
- Myristica depressa W.J.de Wilde

Species of tree

Myristica depressa is a species of plant in the family Myristicaceae. It is a tree found in Sumatra, Peninsular Malaysia and Borneo.
