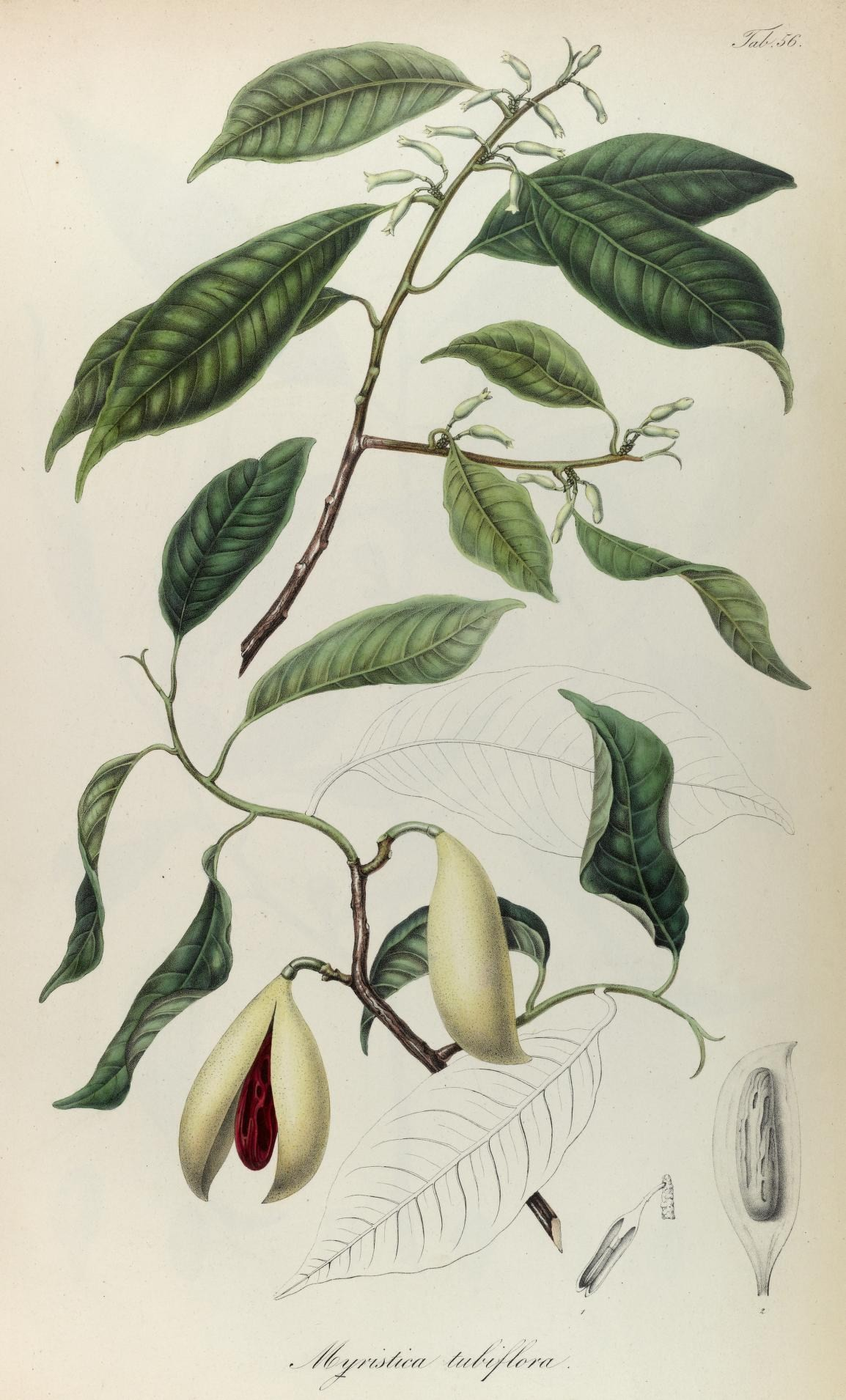
- Illustration of Myristica tubiflora

Conservation status
- Least Concern (IUCN 3.1)

Scientific classification
- Kingdom: Plantae
- Clade: Embryophytes
- Clade: Tracheophytes
- Clade: Spermatophytes
- Clade: Angiosperms
- Clade: Magnoliids
- Order: Magnoliales
- Family: Myristicaceae
- Genus: Myristica
- Species: M. tubiflora

Binomial name
- Myristica tubiflora Blume

Synonyms
- Palala tubiflora (Blume) Kuntze

= Myristica tubiflora =

Species of tree

Myristica tubiflora is a species of flowering plant in the family Myristicaceae. It is a tree native to western and southern New Guinea.

The species was described by Carl Ludwig Blume in 1837.
