= Myristica cinnamomea =

Conservation status
- Least Concern (IUCN 3.1)

Scientific classification
- Kingdom: Plantae
- Clade: Embryophytes
- Clade: Tracheophytes
- Clade: Spermatophytes
- Clade: Angiosperms
- Clade: Magnoliids
- Order: Magnoliales
- Family: Myristicaceae
- Genus: Myristica
- Species: M. cinnamomea

Binomial name
- Myristica cinnamomea King

Species of tree

Myristica cinnamomea is a species of flowering plant in the nutmeg family, Myristicaceae. It is found in Sumatra, Peninsular Malaysia, Singapore and Borneo.
