= Myristica crassa =

Conservation status
- Near Threatened (IUCN 2.3)

Scientific classification
- Kingdom: Plantae
- Clade: Embryophytes
- Clade: Tracheophytes
- Clade: Spermatophytes
- Clade: Angiosperms
- Clade: Magnoliids
- Order: Magnoliales
- Family: Myristicaceae
- Genus: Myristica
- Species: M. crassa

Binomial name
- Myristica crassa King

Synonyms
- Myristica suavis King

Species of tree

Myristica crassa is a species of flowering plant in the family Myristicaceae. It is a tree native to Peninsular Malaysia, Singapore, Borneo, and Sumatra.
