= Myristica lasiocarpa =

Conservation status
- Vulnerable (IUCN 3.1)

Scientific classification
- Kingdom: Plantae
- Clade: Tracheophytes
- Clade: Angiosperms
- Clade: Magnoliids
- Order: Magnoliales
- Family: Myristicaceae
- Genus: Myristica
- Species: M. lasiocarpa

Binomial name
- Myristica lasiocarpa W.J.de Wilde

Species of flowering plant

Myristica lasiocarpa is a species of flowering plant in the family Myristicaceae. It is a tree endemic to Papua New Guinea. It is known only from the Kuper Range area of Morobe Province. It is a small tree which grows 10 to 12 meters tall and fruits in October and November. It grows in the sub-canopy of Nothofagus montane rain forest from 1,600 to 2,000 metres elevation.
