= Myristica maingayi =

Conservation status
- Near Threatened (IUCN 2.3)

Scientific classification
- Kingdom: Plantae
- Clade: Tracheophytes
- Clade: Angiosperms
- Clade: Magnoliids
- Order: Magnoliales
- Family: Myristicaceae
- Genus: Myristica
- Species: M. maingayi

Binomial name
- Myristica maingayi Hook.f.

Species of tree

Myristica maingayi is a species of plant in the family Myristicaceae. It is a tree found in Sumatra, Peninsular Malaysia and Singapore.
