= Myristica maxima =

Conservation status
- Least Concern (IUCN 3.1)

Scientific classification
- Kingdom: Plantae
- Clade: Embryophytes
- Clade: Tracheophytes
- Clade: Spermatophytes
- Clade: Angiosperms
- Clade: Magnoliids
- Order: Magnoliales
- Family: Myristicaceae
- Genus: Myristica
- Species: M. maxima

Binomial name
- Myristica maxima Warb.

Species of tree

Myristica maxima (Latin for 'the largest') is a species of flowering plant in the family Myristicaceae. It is a tree native to Peninsular Thailand, Peninsular Malaysia, Singapore, Borneo, and Sumatra. Local names in Borneo include Darah-darah, Koomping, Kumpang, Mandarahan, and Rah.
