= Myristica yunnanensis =

Conservation status
- Critically Endangered (IUCN 2.3)

Scientific classification
- Kingdom: Plantae
- Clade: Tracheophytes
- Clade: Angiosperms
- Clade: Magnoliids
- Order: Magnoliales
- Family: Myristicaceae
- Genus: Myristica
- Species: M. yunnanensis

Binomial name
- Myristica yunnanensis Y.H. Li

Species of tree

Myristica yunnanensis is a species of plant in the family Myristicaceae. It is found in southern Yunnan, China, northern Thailand, and in Thanh Hóa Province, Vietnam. It is a large, evergreen tree, up to 30 m (98 ft) tall.

At the time of the latest IUCN assessment in 1998, Myristica yunnanensis was only known from about 20 trees in two localities in Xishuangbanna in Yunnan; it was assessed as "Critically Endangered". However, later it has been found to have a somewhat broader distribution reaching Thailand and Vietnam too. The Vietnamese record is from the Bến En National Park.
