= Myristica elliptica =

Conservation status
- Least Concern (IUCN 2.3)

Scientific classification
- Kingdom: Plantae
- Clade: Embryophytes
- Clade: Tracheophytes
- Clade: Spermatophytes
- Clade: Angiosperms
- Clade: Magnoliids
- Order: Magnoliales
- Family: Myristicaceae
- Genus: Myristica
- Species: M. elliptica

Binomial name
- Myristica elliptica Wall. ex Hook.f. & Thomson

Synonyms
- Myristica calocarpa Miq.; Myristica sycocarpa Miq.; Palala calocarpa (Miq.) Kuntze; Palala elliptica (Wall. ex Hook.f. & Thomson) Kuntze; Palala sycocarpa (Miq.) Kuntze

Species of tree

Myristica elliptica is a species of flowering plant in the family Myristicaceae. It is a tree native to the Nicobar Islands, Peninsular Thailand, Peninsular Malaysia, Singapore, Sumatra, and Borneo.
