= Myristica hollrungii =

Conservation status
- Least Concern (IUCN 3.1)

Scientific classification
- Kingdom: Plantae
- Clade: Embryophytes
- Clade: Tracheophytes
- Clade: Spermatophytes
- Clade: Angiosperms
- Clade: Magnoliids
- Order: Magnoliales
- Family: Myristicaceae
- Genus: Myristica
- Species: M. hollrungii

Binomial name
- Myristica hollrungii Warb.

Synonyms
- Myristica albertisii Warb.; Myristica euryocarpa Warb.

Species of flowering plant

Myristica hollrungii is a species of flowering plant in the family Myristicaceae. It is a tree native to New Guinea, the Bismarck Archipelago, and the Solomon Islands.
