= Myristica trianthera =

Conservation status
- Vulnerable (IUCN 2.3)

Scientific classification
- Kingdom: Plantae
- Clade: Embryophytes
- Clade: Tracheophytes
- Clade: Spermatophytes
- Clade: Angiosperms
- Clade: Magnoliids
- Order: Magnoliales
- Family: Myristicaceae
- Genus: Myristica
- Species: M. trianthera

Binomial name
- Myristica trianthera W.J.de Wilde

Species of flowering plant

Myristica trianthera is a species of plant in the family Myristicaceae. It is endemic to northwestern New Guinea in the West Papua region of Indonesia.
