= Myristica corticata =

Conservation status
- Vulnerable (IUCN 2.3)

Scientific classification
- Kingdom: Plantae
- Clade: Embryophytes
- Clade: Tracheophytes
- Clade: Spermatophytes
- Clade: Angiosperms
- Clade: Magnoliids
- Order: Magnoliales
- Family: Myristicaceae
- Genus: Myristica
- Species: M. corticata

Binomial name
- Myristica corticata W.J. de Wilde

Species of tree

Myristica corticata is a species of flowering plant in the family Myristicaceae. It is a tree endemic to Brunei and Sabah in Borneo.
