= Myristica guillauminiana =

Conservation status
- Endangered (IUCN 3.1)

Scientific classification
- Kingdom: Plantae
- Clade: Embryophytes
- Clade: Tracheophytes
- Clade: Spermatophytes
- Clade: Angiosperms
- Clade: Magnoliids
- Order: Magnoliales
- Family: Myristicaceae
- Genus: Myristica
- Species: M. guillauminiana

Binomial name
- Myristica guillauminiana A.C.Sm.

Species of flowering plant

Myristica guillauminiana is a species of flowering plant in the family Myristicaceae. It is a tree endemic to the adjacent islands of Gaua, Vanua Lava, and Mota Lava in the Banks Islands (Torba Province) of northern Vanuatu.
