= Myristica gigantea =

Conservation status
- Near Threatened (IUCN 2.3)

Scientific classification
- Kingdom: Plantae
- Clade: Embryophytes
- Clade: Tracheophytes
- Clade: Spermatophytes
- Clade: Angiosperms
- Clade: Magnoliids
- Order: Magnoliales
- Family: Myristicaceae
- Genus: Myristica
- Species: M. gigantea

Binomial name
- Myristica gigantea King

Species of tree

Myristica gigantea is a species of flowering plant in the family Myristicaceae. It is a tree found in Sumatra, Peninsular Malaysia and Borneo.
