= Myristica dasycarpa =

Conservation status
- Endangered (IUCN 3.1)

Scientific classification
- Kingdom: Plantae
- Clade: Embryophytes
- Clade: Tracheophytes
- Clade: Spermatophytes
- Clade: Angiosperms
- Clade: Magnoliids
- Order: Magnoliales
- Family: Myristicaceae
- Genus: Myristica
- Species: M. dasycarpa

Binomial name
- Myristica dasycarpa W.J.de Wilde

Species of flowering plant

Myristica dasycarpa is a species of flowering plant in the family Myristicaceae. It is endemic to northern New Guinea in Papua New Guinea.

== Description ==
It is a tree growing 10 m high. Twigs are stout, 8-10 mm in diameter towards the apex, subterete, with conspicuous wings 2(-3) mm high running at both sides from petiole to petiole, bright brown, with scattered concolorous lenticels, twig partially somewhat swollen and hollow.
