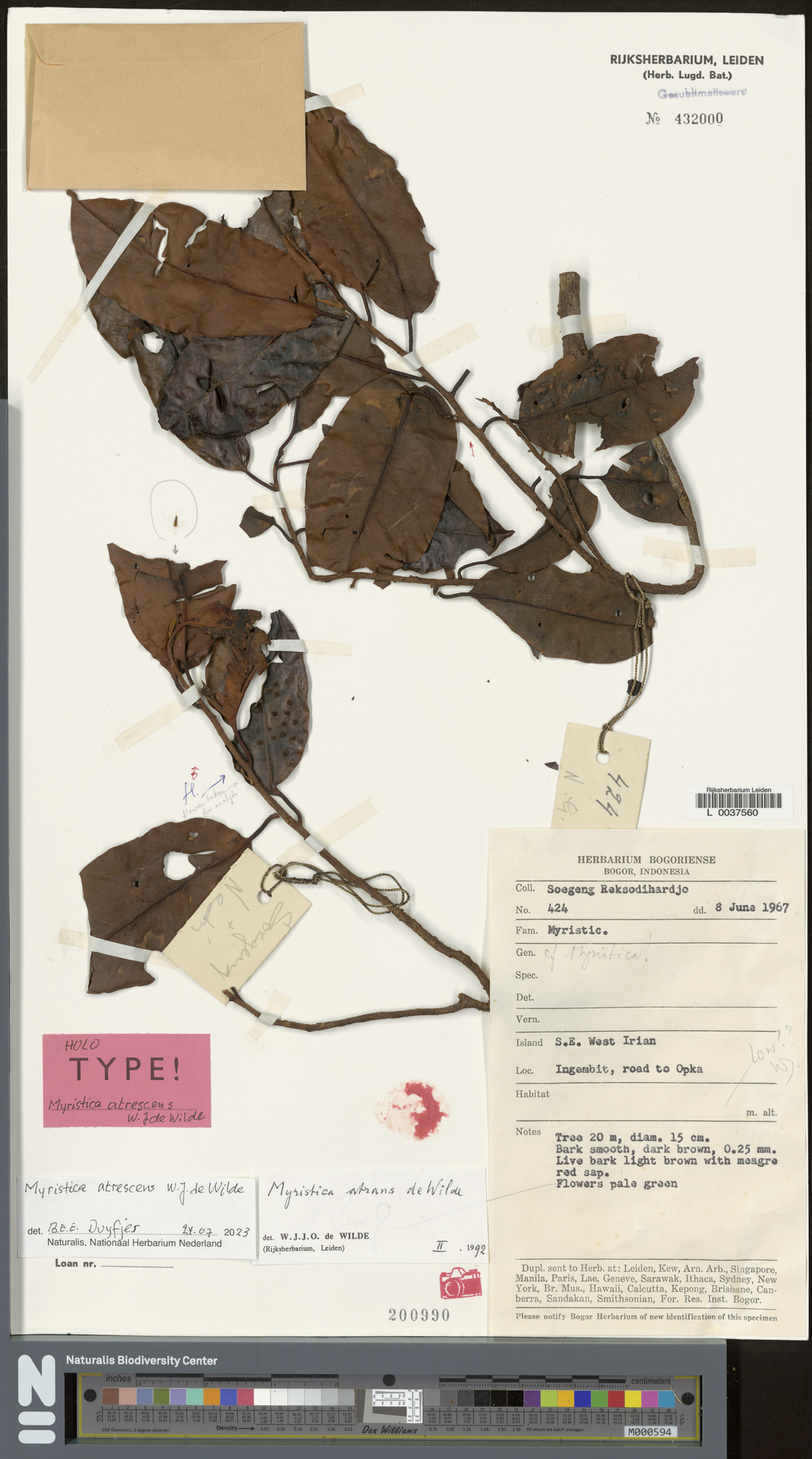
- Holotype specimen of Myristica atrescens

Conservation status
- Data Deficient (IUCN 3.1)

Scientific classification
- Kingdom: Plantae
- Clade: Embryophytes
- Clade: Tracheophytes
- Clade: Spermatophytes
- Clade: Angiosperms
- Clade: Magnoliids
- Order: Magnoliales
- Family: Myristicaceae
- Genus: Myristica
- Species: M. atrescens

Binomial name
- Myristica atrescens W.J.de Wilde

= Myristica atrescens =

Species of flowering plant

Myristica atrescens is a species of flowering plant in the family Myristicaceae. It is a tree endemic to southern New Guinea. It grows in lowland rain forest.
