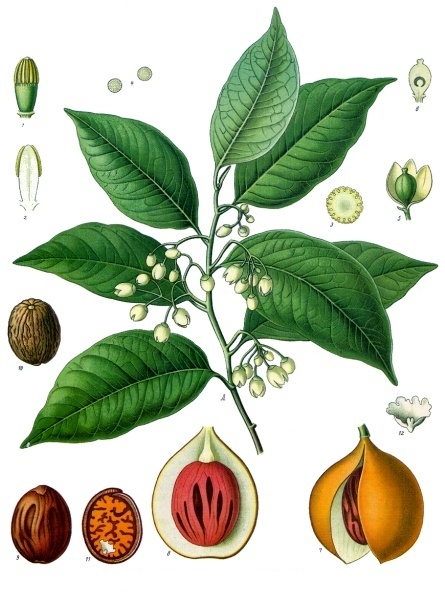
- Myristica fragrans

Scientific classification
- Kingdom: Plantae
- Clade: Tracheophytes
- Clade: Angiosperms
- Clade: Magnoliids
- Order: Magnoliales
- Family: Myristicaceae
- Genus: Myristica; Gronov.

Species
- >150; see text

Synonyms
- Aruana Burm.f.; Comacum Adans.; Palala Rumph. ex Kuntze; Sebophora Neck.

= Myristica =

Genus of trees in Myristicaceae family

Myristica is a genus of trees in the family Myristicaceae. There are over 150 species, distributed in Asia and the western Pacific as far as Vanuatu. Approximately 100 species are found on New Guinea alone, and practically all of them are island specific.

The type species of the genus, and the most economically important member, is Myristica fragrans (the nutmeg tree), from which mace is also derived.

== Etymology ==
The name Myristica is from the Greek adjective myristikos, meaning ‘fragrant, for anointing’, referring to its early use. The adjective is from the noun μύρον myron (‘perfume, ointment, anointing oil’).

== Description ==
All or nearly all species are dioecious. Knuth (1904) however cites a report of trees being male in their sex expression when young and female later. Perianth of one whorl of three largely united segments. Stamens two to thirty, partly or wholly united. The ovary is superior, consisting of a single uniovulate carpel. Species in this genus use secondary pollen presentation (pollen presentation in the flower which does not use an anther), the type of which is Pollenhaufen (German for ‘pollen-heap’), where pollen is in an exposed heap at the base of the flower.

== Selected species ==
There are 172 accepted Myristica species as of April 2021 according to Plants of the World Online. Selected species include:

- Myristica alba W.J.de Wilde
- Myristica andamanica Hook.f.
- Myristica arfakensis W.J.de Wilde
- Myristica argentea Warb.
- Myristica atrescens W.J.de Wilde
- Myristica basilanica W.J.de Wilde
- Myristica beddomei King
- Myristica brachypoda W.J.de Wilde
- Myristica brevistipes W.J.de Wilde
- Myristica buchneriana Warb.
- Myristica byssacea W.J.de Wilde
- Myristica ceylanica A.DC.
- Myristica cinnamomea King
- Myristica coacta W.J.de Wilde
- Myristica colinridsdalei W.J.de Wilde
- Myristica conspersa W.J.de Wilde
- Myristica corticata W.J.de Wilde
- Myristica crassa King
- Myristica dactyloides Gaertn.
- Myristica dasycarpa W.J.de Wilde
- Myristica depressa W.J.de Wilde
- Myristica devogelii W.J.de Wilde
- Myristica elliptica Wall. ex Hook.f. & Thomson
- Myristica extensa W.J.de Wilde
- Myristica fasciculata W.J.de Wilde
- Myristica filipes W.J.de Wilde
- Myristica fissurata W.J.de Wilde
- Myristica flavovirens W.J.de Wilde
- Myristica fragrans Houtt.
- Myristica frugifera W.J.de Wilde
- Myristica gigantea King
- Myristica gillespieana A.C.Sm.
- Myristica globosa Warb.
- Myristica grandifolia A.DC.
- Myristica guadalcanalensis W.J.de Wilde
- Myristica guatteriifolia A.DC.
- Myristica guillauminiana A.C.Sm.
- Myristica hollrungii Warb.
- Myristica inaequalis W.J.de Wilde
- Myristica incredibilis W.J.de Wilde
- Myristica iners Blume
- Myristica insipida R.Br.
  - Myristica insipida var. cimicifera (Sol. ex R.Br.) Jessup (synonym M. ampliata W.J.de Wilde)
- Myristica inundata W.J.de Wilde
- Myristica johnsii W.J.de Wilde
- Myristica kalkmanii W.J.de Wilde
- Myristica kjellbergii W.J.de Wilde
- Myristica lasiocarpa W.J.de Wilde
- Myristica lepidota Blume
- Myristica leptophylla W.J.de Wilde
- Myristica lowiana King
- Myristica macrantha A.C.Sm.
- Myristica magnifica Bedd.
- Myristica maingayi Hook.f.
- Myristica malabarica Lam.
- Myristica maxima Warb.
- Myristica mediterranea W.J.de Wilde
- Myristica millepunctata W.J.de Wilde
- Myristica nana W.J.de Wilde
- Myristica olivacea W.J.de Wilde
- Myristica ornata W.J.de Wilde
- Myristica ovicarpa W.J.de Wilde
- Myristica pachycarpidia W.J.de Wilde
- Myristica papillatifolia W.J.de Wilde
- Myristica perlaevis W.J.de Wilde
- Myristica petiolata A.C.Sm.
- Myristica philippensis Lam.
- Myristica pilosella W.J.de Wilde
- Myristica pilosigemma W.J.de Wilde
- Myristica psilocarpa W.J.de Wilde
- Myristica pubicarpa W.J.de Wilde
- Myristica pygmaea W.J.de Wilde
- Myristica robusta W.J.de Wilde
- Myristica sangowoensis (J.Sinclair) W.J.de Wilde
- Myristica sarcantha W.J.de Wilde
- Myristica schlechteri W.J.de Wilde
- Myristica simulans W.J.de Wilde
- Myristica sinclairii W.J.de Wilde
- Myristica sogeriensis W.J.de Wilde
- Myristica succedanea Blume
- Myristica tamrauensis W.J.de Wilde
- Myristica teysmannii Miq.
- Myristica trianthera W.J.de Wilde
- Myristica tubiflora Blume
- Myristica ultrabasica W.J.de Wilde
- Myristica verruculosa W.J.de Wilde
- Myristica xylocarpa W.J.de Wilde
- Myristica yunnanensis Y.H.Li

Some species of Myristica have been reclassified into the genus Virola by some botanical authorities.
