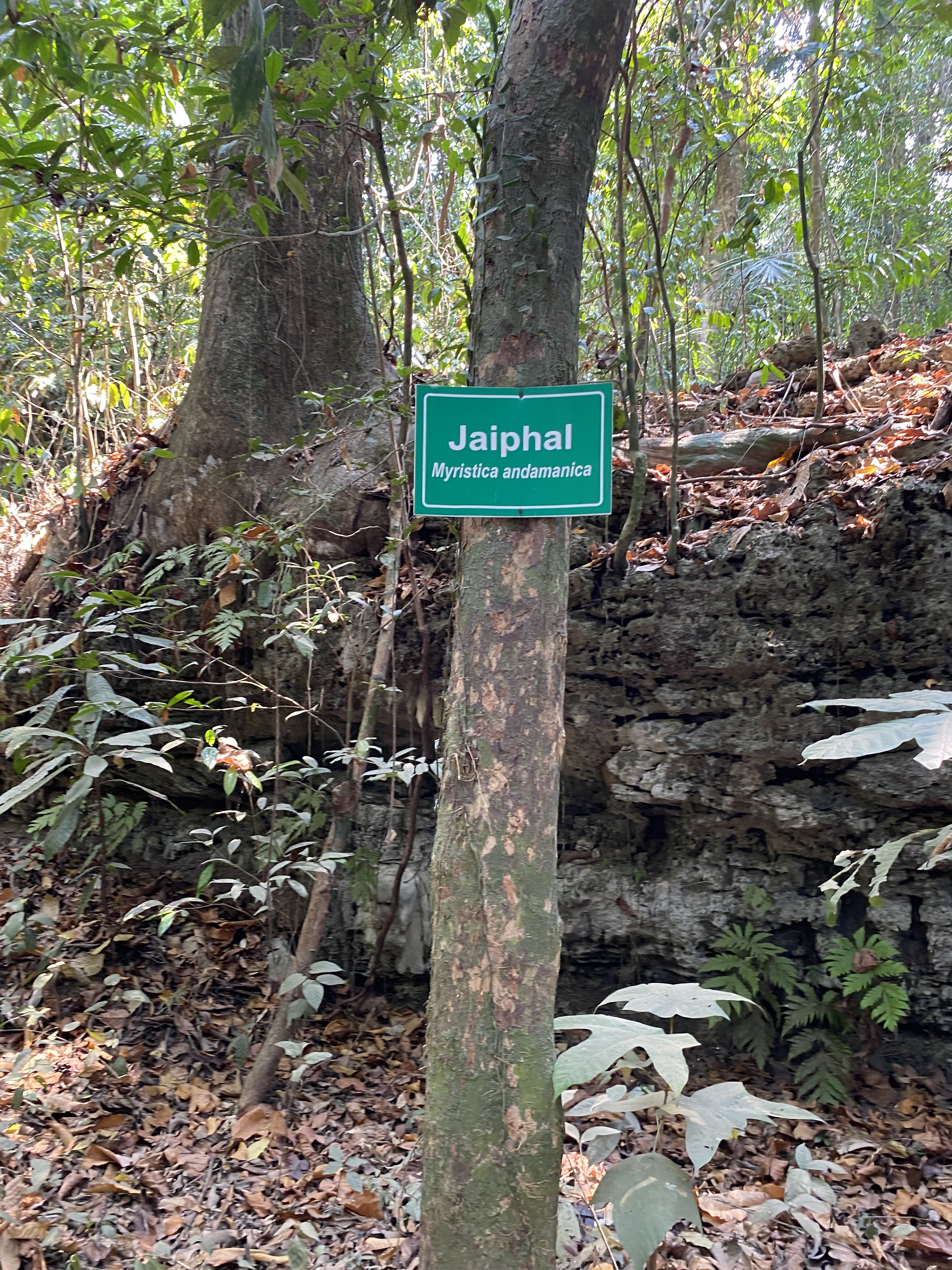
- From Baratang

Conservation status
- Vulnerable (IUCN 2.3)

Scientific classification
- Kingdom: Plantae
- Clade: Embryophytes
- Clade: Tracheophytes
- Clade: Spermatophytes
- Clade: Angiosperms
- Clade: Magnoliids
- Order: Magnoliales
- Family: Myristicaceae
- Genus: Myristica
- Species: M. andamanica

Binomial name
- Myristica andamanica Hook.f.

Synonyms
- Palala andamanica (Hook.f.) Kuntze

= Myristica andamanica =

Species of flowering plant

Myristica andamanica is a species of flowering plant in the family Myristicaceae. It is a tree endemic to the Andaman and Nicobar Islands.

Recent studies by Waman and Bohra (2020) suggested that the seeds can regenerate on their own if they remain undisturbed in soil and favourable microclimatic conditions are available. However, to ensure regular production of seedlings, assisted regeneration was recommended. Retention of seed hull and use of sinking seeds gives high germination percentage. Soaking of seeds in water for 24 hours prior to sowing improved germination.
