= Myristica gillespieana =

Conservation status
- Least Concern (IUCN 3.1)

Scientific classification
- Kingdom: Plantae
- Clade: Embryophytes
- Clade: Tracheophytes
- Clade: Spermatophytes
- Clade: Angiosperms
- Clade: Magnoliids
- Order: Magnoliales
- Family: Myristicaceae
- Genus: Myristica
- Species: M. gillespieana

Binomial name
- Myristica gillespieana A.C.Sm. (1936)

Synonyms
- Myristica hypargyraea var. gillespieana (A.C.Sm.) Sinclair (1968)

Species of flowering plant

Myristica gillespieana is a species of flowering plant in the family Myristicaceae. It is a tree endemic to Fiji. It grows in lowland tropical moist forests, where it is widespread.
