= Myristica succedanea =

Conservation status
- Least Concern (IUCN 3.1)

Scientific classification
- Kingdom: Plantae
- Clade: Embryophytes
- Clade: Tracheophytes
- Clade: Spermatophytes
- Clade: Angiosperms
- Clade: Magnoliids
- Order: Magnoliales
- Family: Myristicaceae
- Genus: Myristica
- Species: M. succedanea

Binomial name
- Myristica succedanea Blume

Synonyms
- Myristica lakilaki Murata & Nitta; Myristica radja Miq.; Myristica schefferi Warb.; Myristica speciosa Warb.; Palala radja (Miq.) Kuntze; Palala succedanea (Blume) Kuntze

Species of tree

Myristica succedanea is a species of flowering plant in the family Myristicaceae. It is a tree endemic to the northern Maluku Islands in Indonesia.
