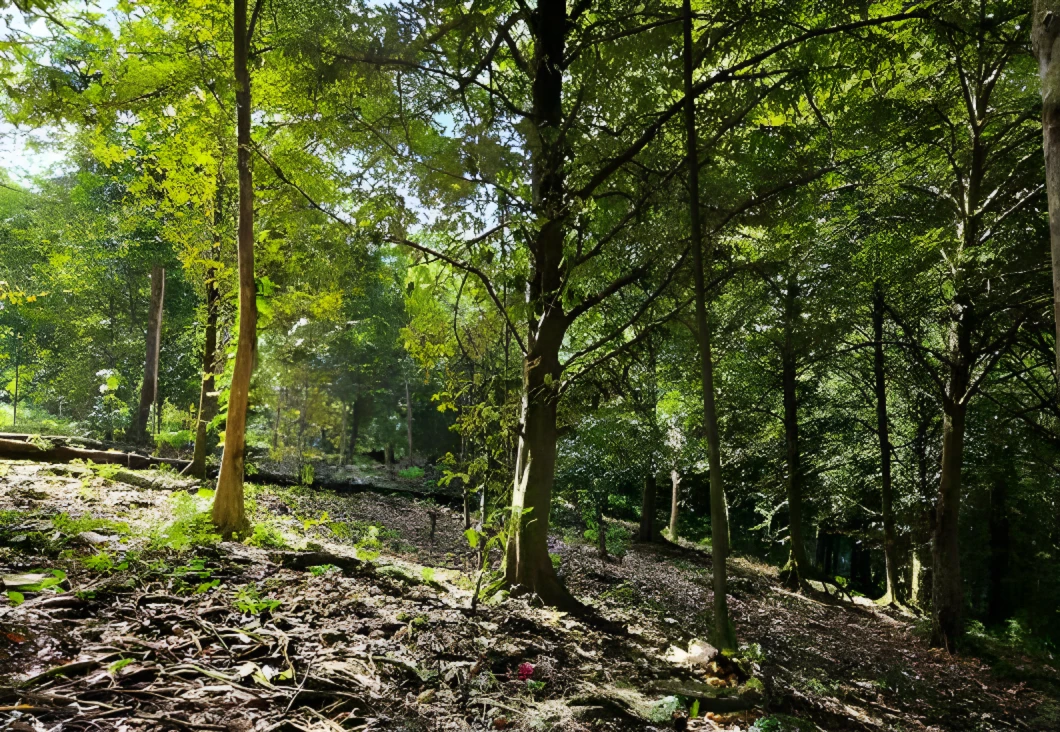
- trees in Fakfak Tomandin Nutmeg Plantation

Conservation status
- Vulnerable (IUCN 3.1)

Scientific classification
- Kingdom: Plantae
- Clade: Embryophytes
- Clade: Tracheophytes
- Clade: Spermatophytes
- Clade: Angiosperms
- Clade: Magnoliids
- Order: Magnoliales
- Family: Myristicaceae
- Genus: Myristica
- Species: M. argentea

Binomial name
- Myristica argentea Warb.

= Myristica argentea =

Species of tree

Myristica argentea is a tree that grows in the primary rain forests of New Guinea, especially in the forest of Fakfak, Kaimana and the surrounding islands in Eastern Indonesia, like Aru Islands. It is occasionally a source of nutmeg, and it (or its seed) is called Macassar nutmeg, Papuan nutmeg, long nutmeg or silver nutmeg. Locally in Indonesia, it is also called Fakfak nutmeg, Tomandin or Henggi in Mbaham-Matta language.

== Description ==
The leaves are simple and spiral. The petiole is stout, cracked transversally, channeled, and 2.8 cm long. The blade is glossy, 20 cm × 6.4 cm – 13.5 cm × 5.6 cm – 19 cm × 6 cm, elliptic, acuminate at the apex in a tail, and shows 13–18 pairs of secondary nerves. The inflorescences are 4.5 cm-long racemes. The fruits are globose and 6mm long.
