= Myristica ceylanica =

Conservation status
- Vulnerable (IUCN 2.3)

Scientific classification
- Kingdom: Plantae
- Clade: Embryophytes
- Clade: Tracheophytes
- Clade: Spermatophytes
- Clade: Angiosperms
- Clade: Magnoliids
- Order: Magnoliales
- Family: Myristicaceae
- Genus: Myristica
- Species: M. ceylanica

Binomial name
- Myristica ceylanica A.DC.

Synonyms
- Myristica zeylanica Thwaites

Species of flowering plant

Myristica ceylanica is a species of flowering plant in the family Myristicaceae. It is a tree endemic to Sri Lanka.
