= Myristica papillatifolia =

Conservation status
- Vulnerable (IUCN 3.1)

Scientific classification
- Kingdom: Plantae
- Clade: Embryophytes
- Clade: Tracheophytes
- Clade: Spermatophytes
- Clade: Angiosperms
- Clade: Magnoliids
- Order: Magnoliales
- Family: Myristicaceae
- Genus: Myristica
- Species: M. papillatifolia

Binomial name
- Myristica papillatifolia W.J.de Wilde

Species of tree

Myristica papillatifolia is a species of flowering plant in the family Myristicaceae. It is a shrub or tree endemic to New Guinea.
