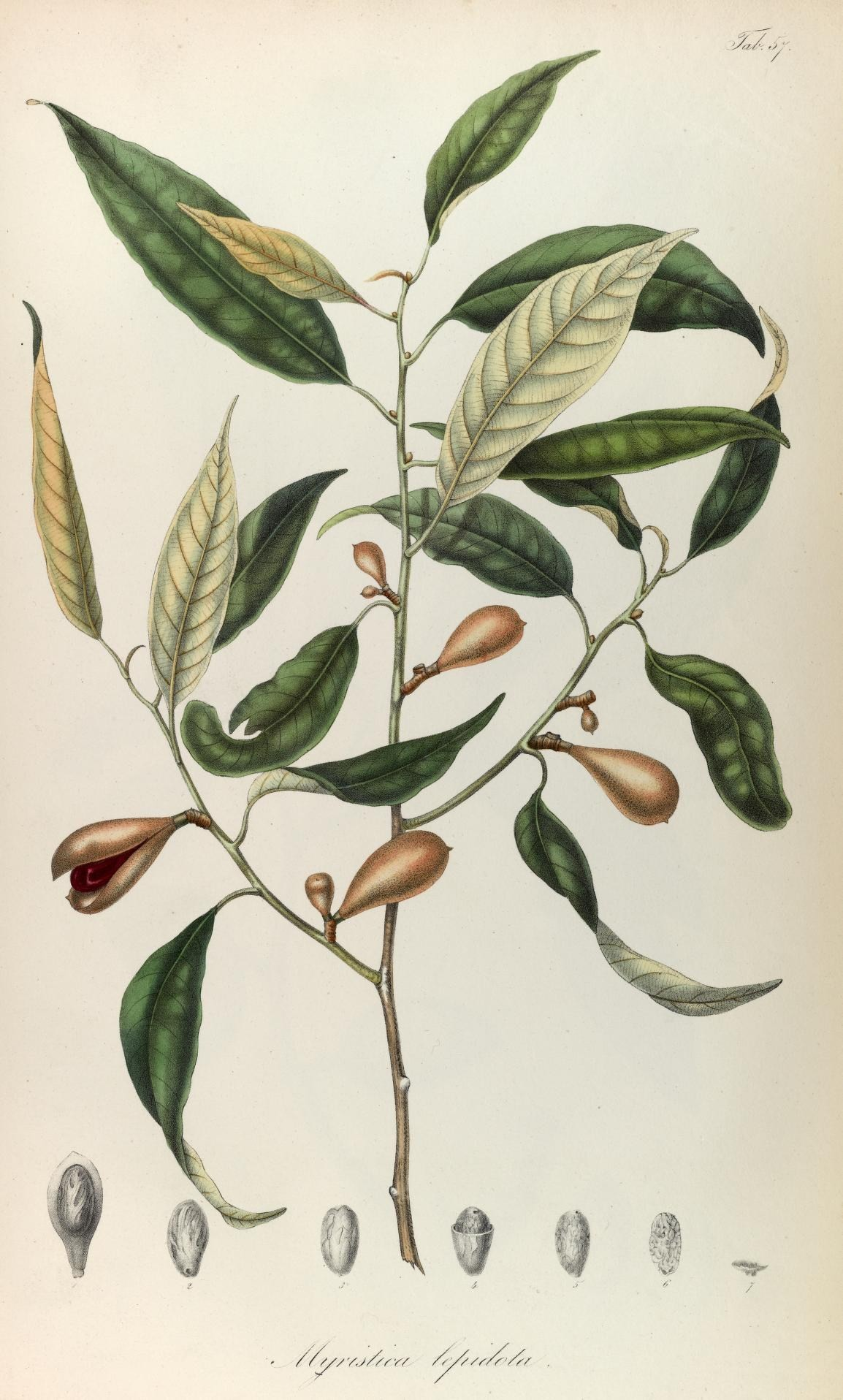
- Illustration of Myristica lepidota

Conservation status
- Least Concern (IUCN 3.1)

Scientific classification
- Kingdom: Plantae
- Clade: Embryophytes
- Clade: Tracheophytes
- Clade: Spermatophytes
- Clade: Angiosperms
- Clade: Magnoliids
- Order: Magnoliales
- Family: Myristicaceae
- Genus: Myristica
- Species: M. lepidota

Binomial name
- Myristica lepidota Blume

Synonyms
- synonyms of subsp. lepidota: Palala lepidota Kuntze; synonyms of subsp. montanoides: Myristica montanoides Warb.

= Myristica lepidota =

Species of tree

Myristica lepidota is a species of flowering plant in the family Myristicaceae. It is a tree native to the eastern Maluku Islands and western and southwestern New Guinea. There are two subspecies contained within:

- M. lepidota subsp. lepidota – Aru Islands and Western New Guinea
- M. lepidota subsp. montanoides (Warb.) W.J. de Wilde – northeastern Maluku (Ternate, Obi, Bacan) and Western New Guinea
