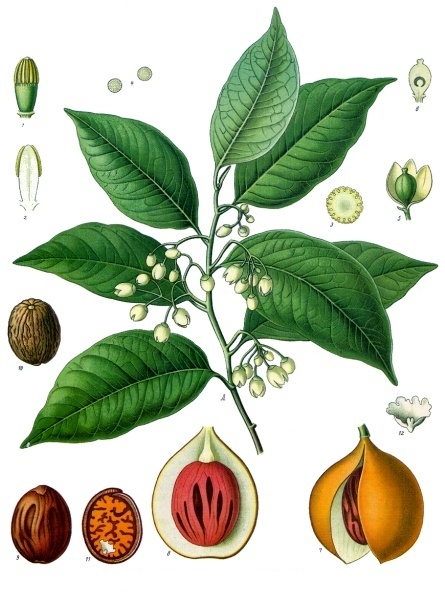

Conservation status
- Data Deficient (IUCN 3.1)

Scientific classification
- Kingdom: Plantae
- Clade: Embryophytes
- Clade: Tracheophytes
- Clade: Spermatophytes
- Clade: Angiosperms
- Clade: Magnoliids
- Order: Magnoliales
- Family: Myristicaceae
- Genus: Myristica
- Species: M. fragrans

Binomial name
- Myristica fragrans Houtt.

Synonyms
- Aruana silvestris Burm.f.; Myristica amboinensis Gand.; Myristica aromatica Sw.; Myristica laurella Gand.; Myristica moschata Thunb.; Myristica officinalis L.f.; Myristica philippinensis Gand.; Palala fragrans (Houtt.) Kuntze

= Myristica fragrans =

Evergreen tree, source of nutmeg and mace

Myristica fragrans, commonly known as the nutmeg tree, is an evergreen species indigenous to the Maluku Islands of Indonesia. This aromatic tree is economically significant as the primary source of two distinct spices: nutmeg, derived from its seed, and mace, obtained from the seed's aril.

Valued for centuries in global spice trade, M. fragrans is now widely cultivated throughout tropical regions, including parts of Southeast Asia (Indonesia, Malaysia), South Asia (Kerala in India, Sri Lanka), East Asia (Guangdong and Yunnan in China, Taiwan), the Caribbean (notably Grenada), and South America.

== Description ==
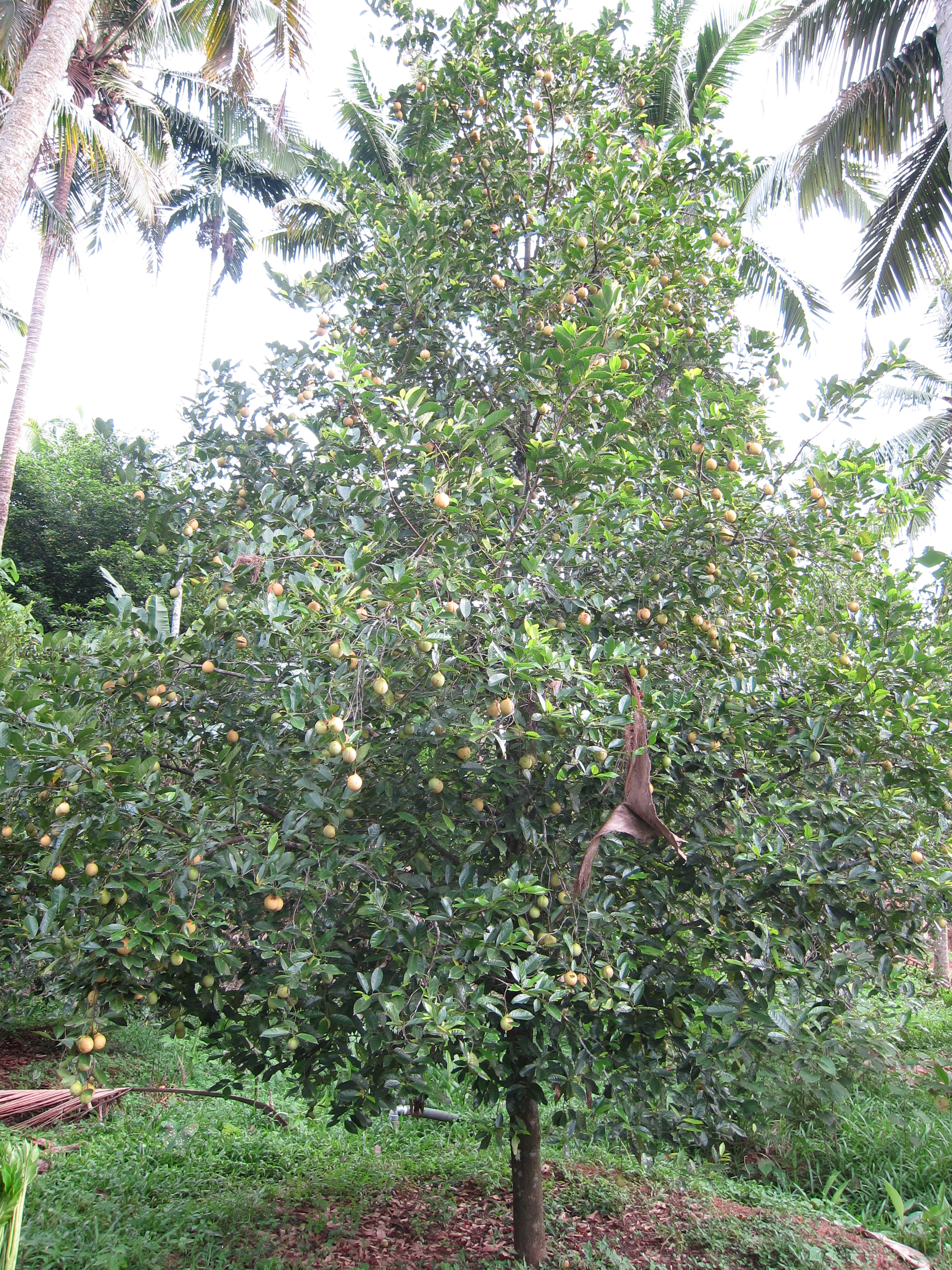
Bearing fruit

Myristica fragrans is an evergreen tree, usually 5–15 m (16–49 ft) tall, but occasionally reaching 20 m (66 ft) or even 30 m (98 ft) on Tidore. The alternately arranged leaves are dark green, 5–15 cm (2.0–5.9 in) long by 2–7 cm (0.8–2.8 in) wide with petioles about 1 cm (0.4 in) long. The species is dioecious, i.e. "male" or staminate flowers and "female" or carpellate flowers are borne on different plants, although occasional individuals produce both kinds of flower. The flowers are bell-shaped, pale yellow and somewhat waxy and fleshy. Staminate flowers are arranged in groups of one to ten, each 5–7 mm (0.2–0.3 in) long; carpellate flowers are in smaller groups, one to three, and somewhat longer, up to 10 mm (0.4 in) long.

Carpellate trees produce smooth yellow ovoid or pear-shaped fruits, 6–9 cm (2.4–3.5 in) long with a diameter of 3.5–5 cm (1.4–2.0 in). The fruit has a fleshy husk. When ripe the husk splits into two halves along a ridge running the length of the fruit. Inside is a purple-brown shiny seed, 2–3 cm (0.8–1.2 in) long by about 2 cm (0.8 in) across, with a red or crimson covering (an aril). The seed is the source of nutmeg; the aril the source of mace.

== Taxonomy ==
Myristica fragrans was given a binomial name by the Dutch botanist Maartyn Houttuyn in 1774. It had earlier been described by Georg Eberhard Rumphius, among others. The specific epithet fragrans means "fragrant".

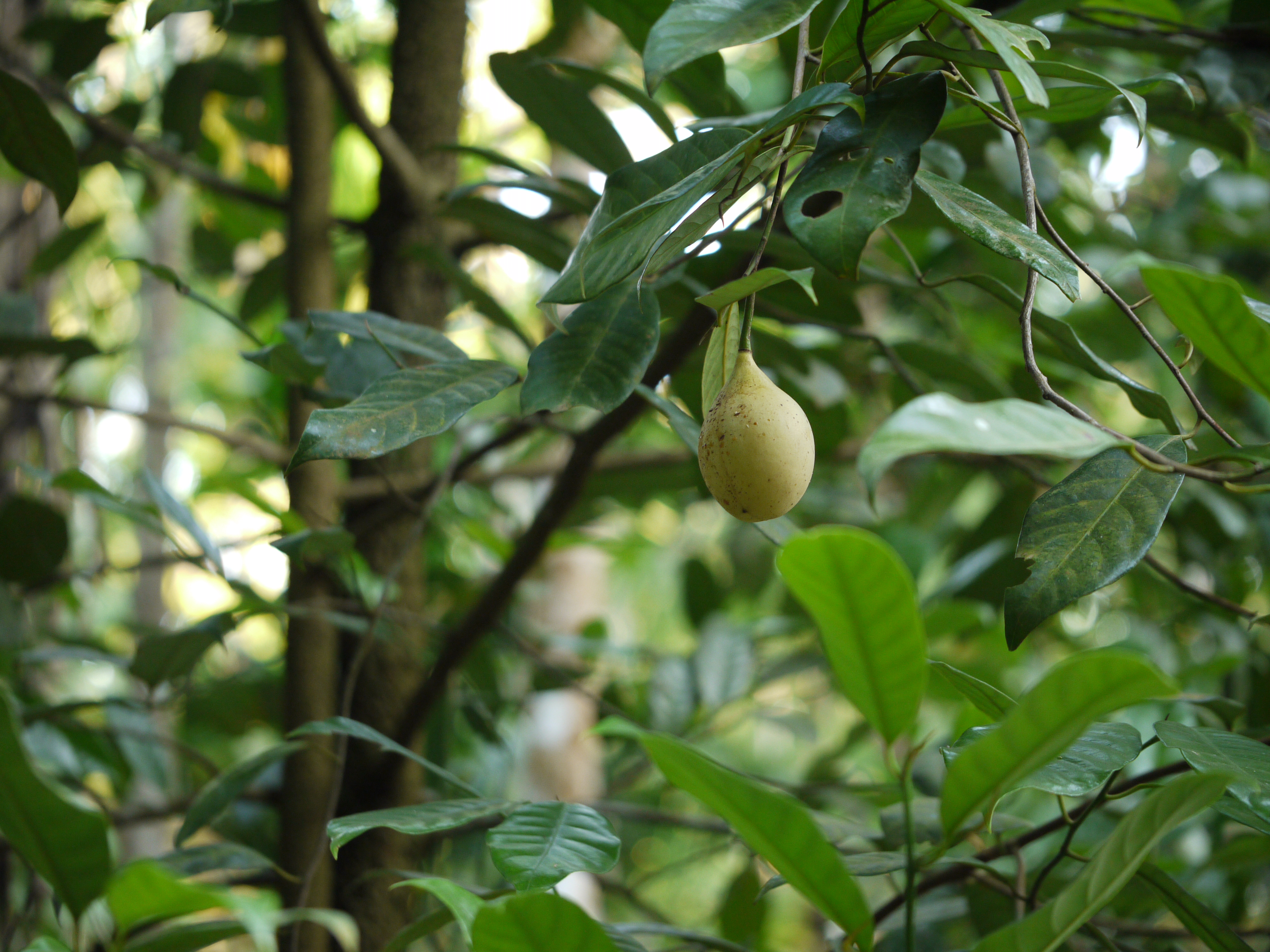
Myristica fragrans unripe fruit

== Uses ==
Myristica fragrans can be used as an accent tree. Ground nutmeg and mace are used in cooking. Seeds from the plant are used to make essential oils while other parts such as arils, bark, flowers and leaves are used for fragrance in soaps and perfumes.

== See also ==
- Spice trade
- Domesticated plants and animals of Austronesia
