= Myristica johnsii =

Conservation status
- Data Deficient (IUCN 3.1)

Scientific classification
- Kingdom: Plantae
- Clade: Embryophytes
- Clade: Tracheophytes
- Clade: Spermatophytes
- Clade: Angiosperms
- Clade: Magnoliids
- Order: Magnoliales
- Family: Myristicaceae
- Genus: Myristica
- Species: M. johnsii

Binomial name
- Myristica johnsii W.J.de Wilde

Synonyms
- Myristica polyantha W.J.de Wilde, nom. illeg. homonym. post.

Species of flowering plant

Myristica johnsii is a species of plant in the family Myristicaceae. It is a tree endemic to New Guinea. It is a large tree which grows up to 25 to 30 metres tall and which flowers and fruits in August and October. It is known from the New Guinea Highlands in Western, West Sepik, Gulf, Morobe and Milne Bay provinces of Papua New Guinea and in Indonesian Western New Guinea. It grows in montane fagaceous forest and foothill forest, and heavily mossed forests in ravines, from 1,000 to 1,600 metres elevation.

The species was first described as Myristica polyantha by W.J. de Wilde. de Wilde later discovered that the name was antedated by Myristica polyantha (Warb.) Boerl., described in 1900 and now considered a synonym of Horsfieldia laevigata. In 2007 de Wilde renamed the species M. johnsii.
