= Myristica philippensis =

Conservation status
- Least Concern (IUCN 3.1)

Scientific classification
- Kingdom: Plantae
- Clade: Embryophytes
- Clade: Tracheophytes
- Clade: Spermatophytes
- Clade: Angiosperms
- Clade: Magnoliids
- Order: Magnoliales
- Family: Myristicaceae
- Genus: Myristica
- Species: M. philippensis

Binomial name
- Myristica philippensis Lam.

Synonyms
- Myristica bracteata A.DC.; Myristica commersonii Blume; Myristica luzonica Blanco; Myristica macrocarpa Blume; Myristica madagascariensis Vent. ex A.DC., not validly publ.; Myristica sylvestris Sieber ex A.DC., not validly publ.; Palala commersonii (Blume) Kuntze; Palala luzonica (Blanco) Kuntze; Palala macrocarpa (Blume) Kuntze; Palala macrocoma (Blume) Kuntze; Palala philippensis (Lam.) Kuntze

Species of flowering plant

Myristica philippensis is a species of flowering plant in the family Myristicaceae. It is a tree endemic to the Philippines.
