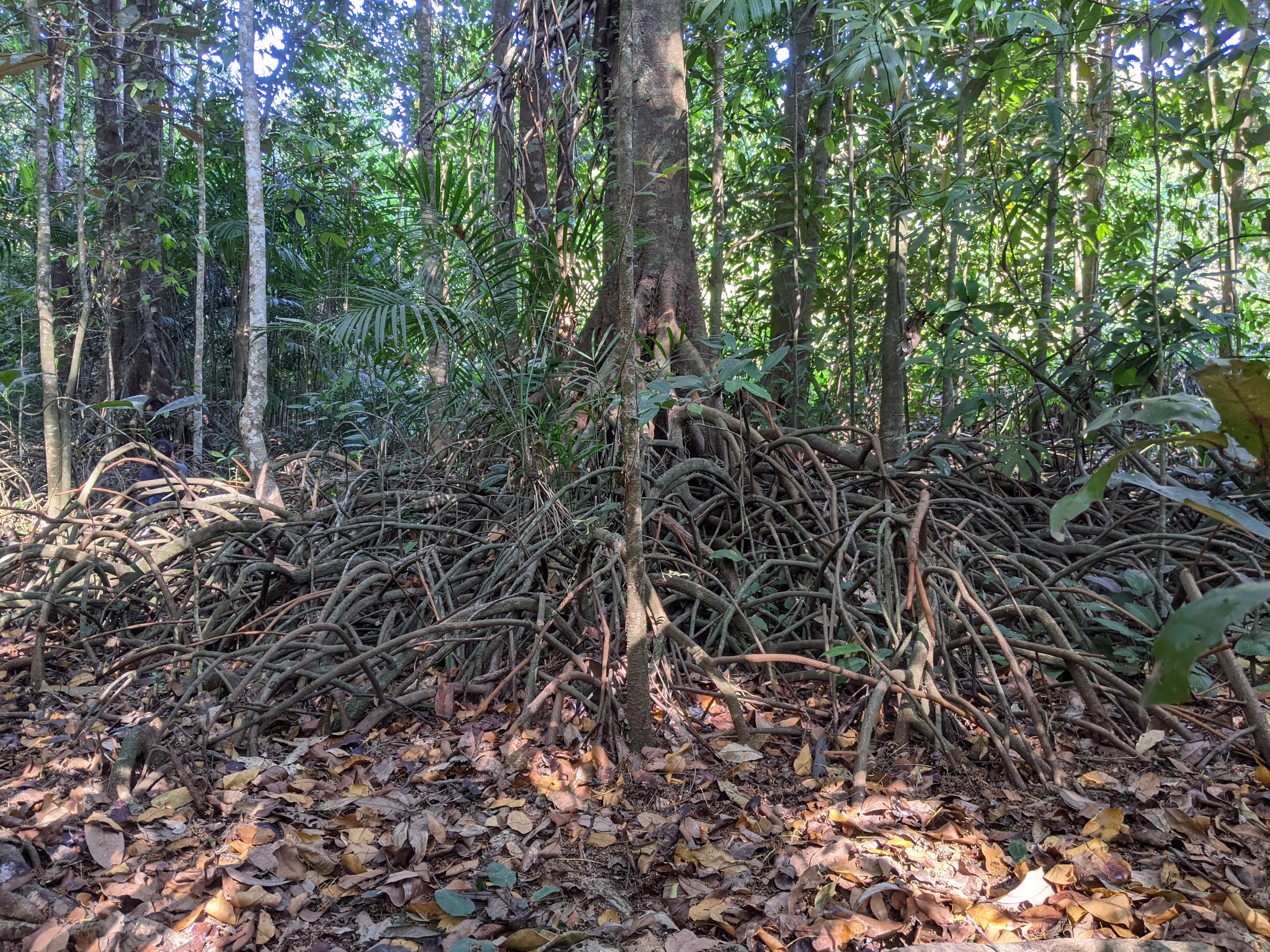

Conservation status
- Endangered (IUCN 2.3)

Scientific classification
- Kingdom: Plantae
- Clade: Tracheophytes
- Clade: Angiosperms
- Clade: Magnoliids
- Order: Magnoliales
- Family: Myristicaceae
- Genus: Myristica
- Species: M. magnifica

Binomial name
- Myristica magnifica Bedd.

= Myristica magnifica =

Species of flowering plant

Myristica magnifica is a species of plant in the family Myristicaceae. It is native to Karnataka and Kerala in India. It is classified as an endangered species according to the IUCN Redlist. The plant grows in terrestrial but swampy habitats along streams in evergreen forests. These swamps get inundated during the monsoons and remain flooded year round.

== Description ==
The tree grows up to 20 m tall. It is seen to have stilt roots that support the main trunk of the tree. These roots emerge from the base of the main trunk and bend downwards to reach the ground. The stilt roots form a tangled network of roots around the tree. The leaves are simple, alternate that grow on short stalks or petioles that are 2–4 cm long. Flowers are dioecious, with male flowers growing on stocks, while female flowers are borne in leaf axils. Male flowers typically grow in clusters and female flowers grow in twos or threes.

== Taxonomy ==
The species was formerly known as Myristica fatua var magnifica. Other synonyms include Palala magnifica.

== Ecology ==
The species found in habitats called Myristica swamps that are dominated by flood tolerant species. These swamps remain water-logged for a large part of the year between June and January. Myristica magnifica is one of the dominant species of these swamps in Southern India.
