= Nutmeg =

Spice from tree seed

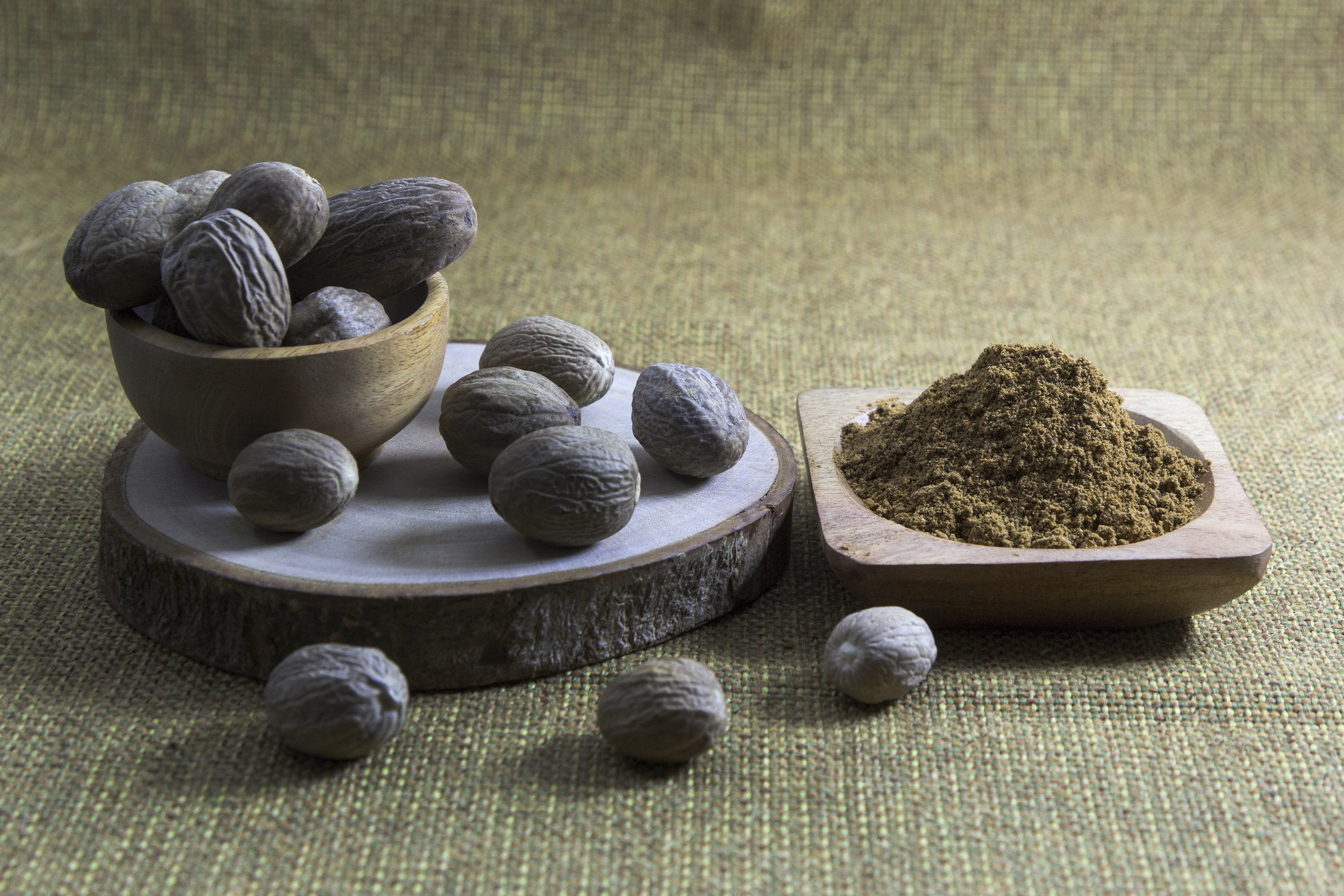
Nutmeg seeds and powder in a bowl

Nutmeg is the seed, or the ground spice derived from the seed, of several tree species of the genus Myristica; fragrant nutmeg or true nutmeg (M. fragrans) is a dark-leaved evergreen tree cultivated for two spices derived from its fruit: nutmeg, from its seed, and mace, from the seed covering. It is also a commercial source of nutmeg essential oil and nutmeg butter. The Banda Islands, in Maluku, Indonesia, are the main producer of nutmeg and mace, and the true nutmeg tree is native to the islands.

Nutmeg and mace, commonly used as food spices, have been used in folk medicine for their psychoactive properties, while their supposed aphrodisiac effects are not supported by clinical evidence. High doses can cause serious toxic effects including acute psychosis, with risks heightened during pregnancy and with psychiatric conditions.

Conifers of the genus Torreya, commonly known as the nutmeg yews, have edible seeds of similar appearance, but are not closely related to M. fragrans, and are not used as a spice.

== Common nutmeg ==
Nutmeg is the spice made by grinding the seed of the fragrant nutmeg tree (Myristica fragrans) into powder. The spice has a distinctive pungent fragrance and a warm, slightly sweet taste; it is used to flavor many kinds of baked goods, confections, puddings, potatoes, meats, sausages, sauces, and vegetables, and beverages, such as eggnog.

The seeds are dried gradually in the sun over a period of 15 to 30 weeks. During this time, the nutmeg shrinks away from its hard seed coat until the kernels rattle in their shells when shaken. The shell is then broken with a wooden club and the nutmegs are picked out. Dried nutmegs are greenish brown ovoids with furrowed surfaces. The nutmegs are roughly egg-shaped, about 20.5–30 mm (0.81–1.18 in) long and 15–18 mm (0.59–0.71 in) wide, weighing 5–10 g (0.18–0.35 oz) dried.

Two other species of genus Myristica with different flavors, M. malabarica and M. argentea, are sometimes used to adulterate nutmeg as a spice.

=== Mace ===
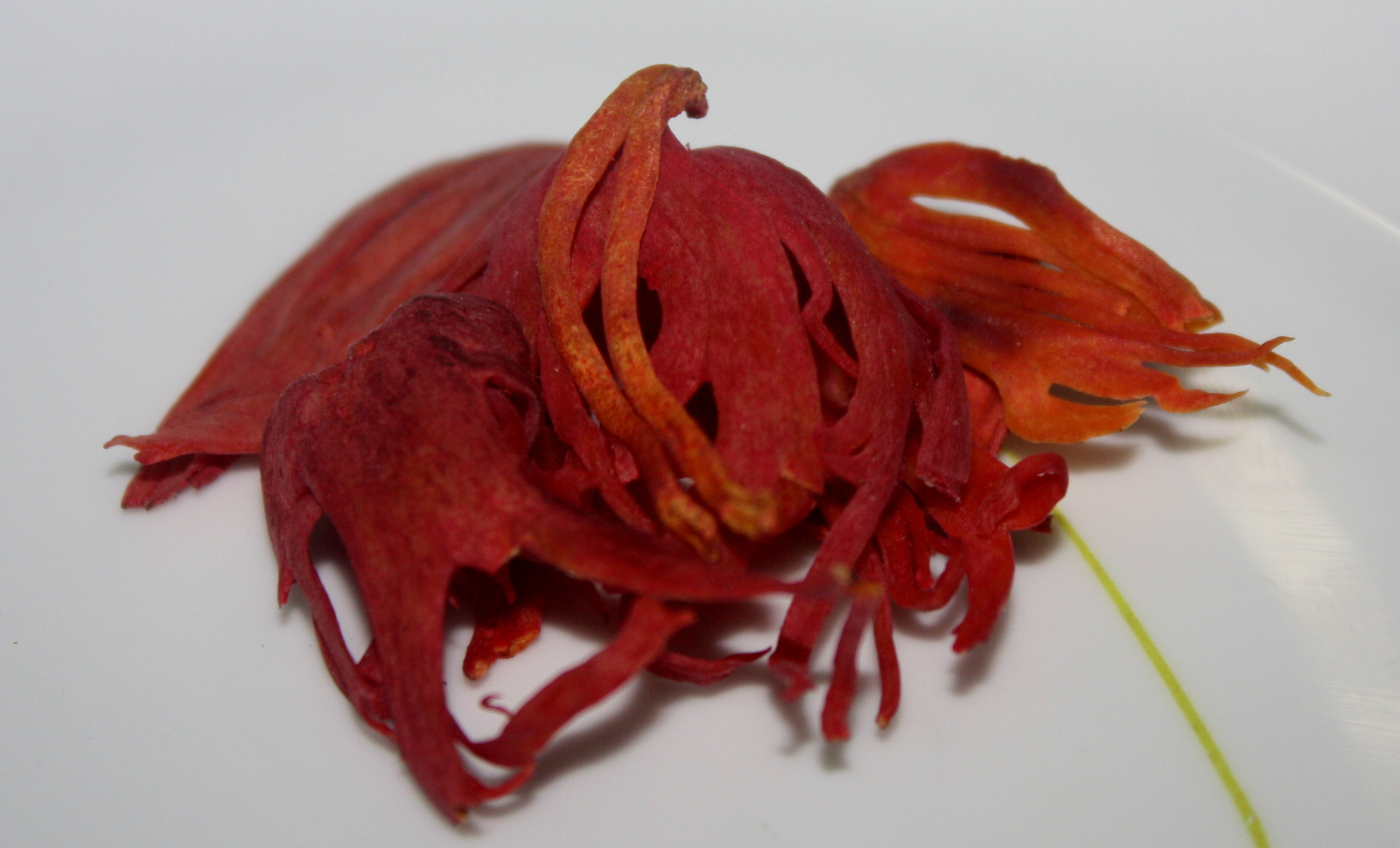
Mace

Mace is the spice made from the reddish seed covering (aril) of the nutmeg seed. Its flavor is similar to that of nutmeg but more delicate; it is used to flavor baked goods, meat, fish, and vegetables, and in preserving and pickling.

In the processing of mace, the crimson-colored aril is removed from the nutmeg seed that it envelops and is flattened out and dried for 10 to 14 days. Its color changes to pale yellow, orange, or tan. Whole dry mace consists of flat pieces—smooth, horn-like, and brittle—about 40 mm (1 1/2 in) long.

== Botany and cultivation ==
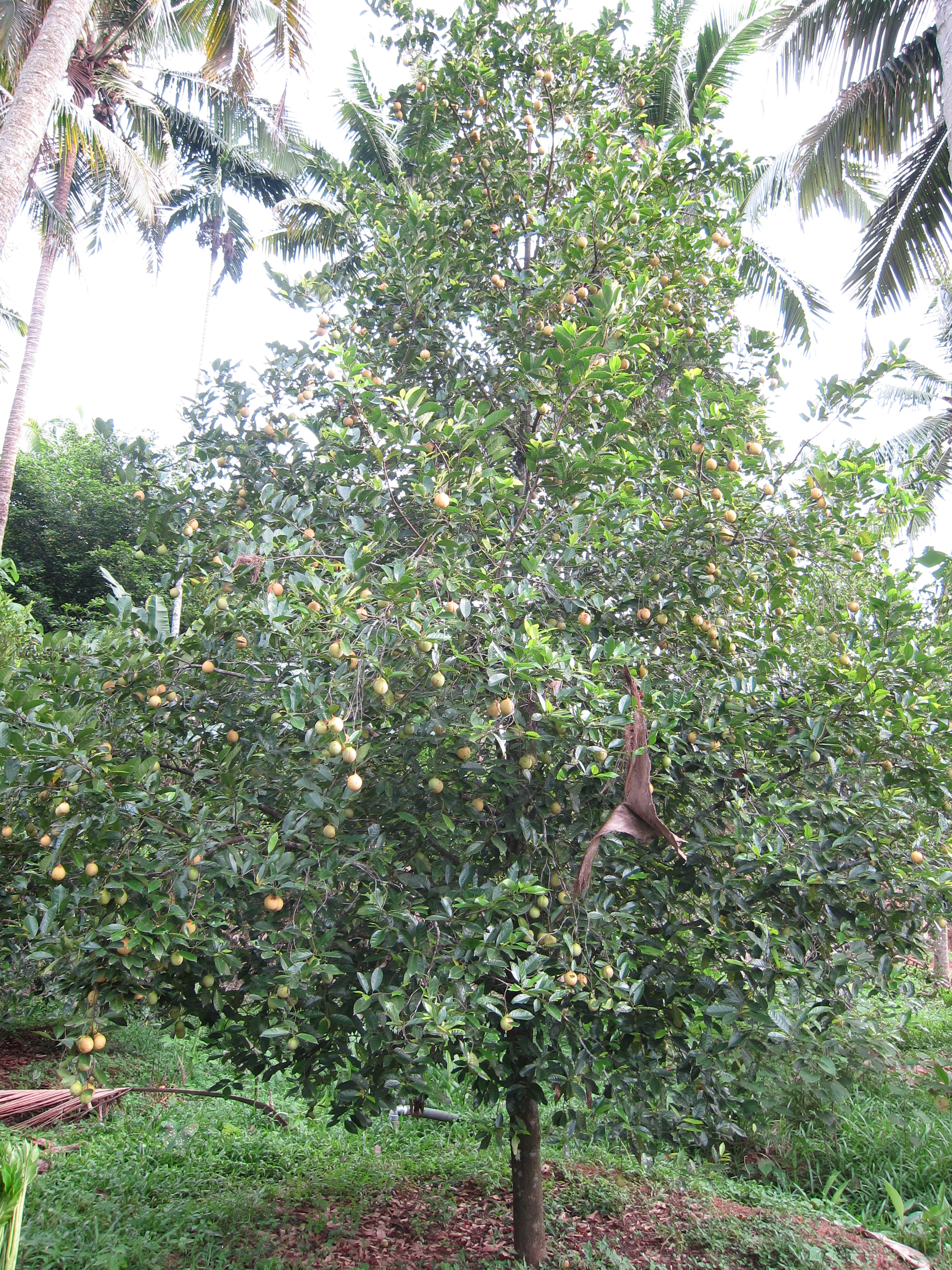
Nutmeg tree (Myristica fragrans).

The most important commercial species is the common, true or fragrant nutmeg, M. fragrans (Myristicaceae), native to the Moluccas (or Spice Islands) of Indonesia. It is also cultivated on Penang Island in Malaysia, in the Caribbean, especially in Grenada, and in Kerala, a state formerly known as Malabar in ancient writings as the hub of spice trading, in southern India. In the 17th-century work Hortus Botanicus Malabaricus, Hendrik van Rheede records that Indians learned the usage of nutmeg from the Indonesians through ancient trade routes.

Nutmeg trees are dioecious plants (individual plants are either male or female), which are propagated sexually from seeds and asexually from cuttings or grafting. Sexual propagation yields 50% male seedlings, which are unproductive. Because no reliable method has been found for determining plant sex before flowering in the sixth to eighth year, and asexual reproduction bears inconsistent yields, grafting is the preferred method of propagation. Epicotyl grafting (a variation of cleft grafting using seedlings), approach grafting, and patch budding have proved successful, with epicotyl grafting being the most widely adopted standard. Air layering is an alternative though not preferred method because of its low (35–40%) success rate.

The first harvest of nutmeg trees takes place 7–9 years after planting, and the trees reach full production after 20 years.

In the Banda Islands to which the nutmeg is native, there is a symbiotic relationship between the Kenari nut tree (Canarium indicum) and the nutmeg (Myristica fragrans), the former providing the nutmeg with shade and serving as a wind-break from the strong winds.

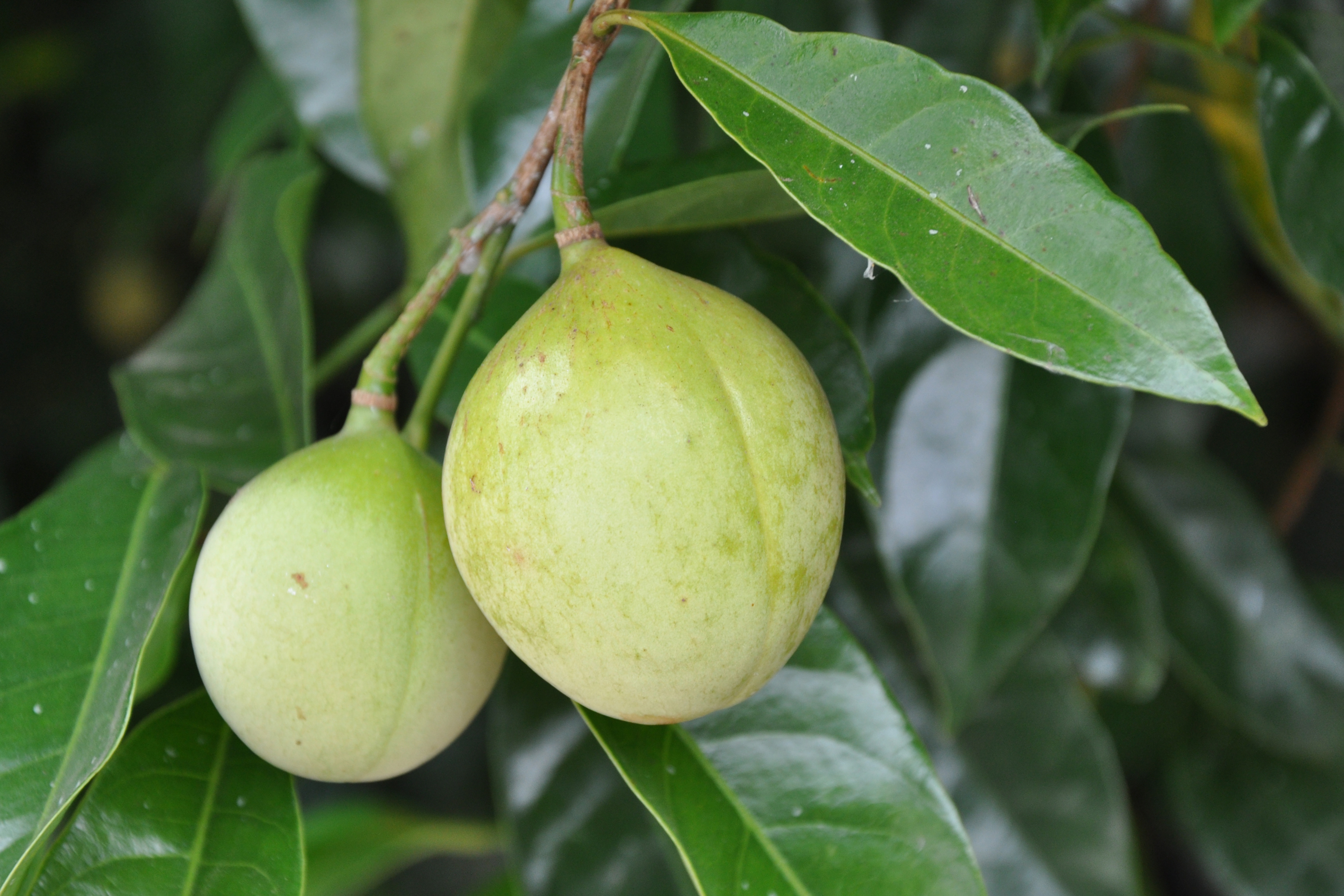
Nutmeg fruit

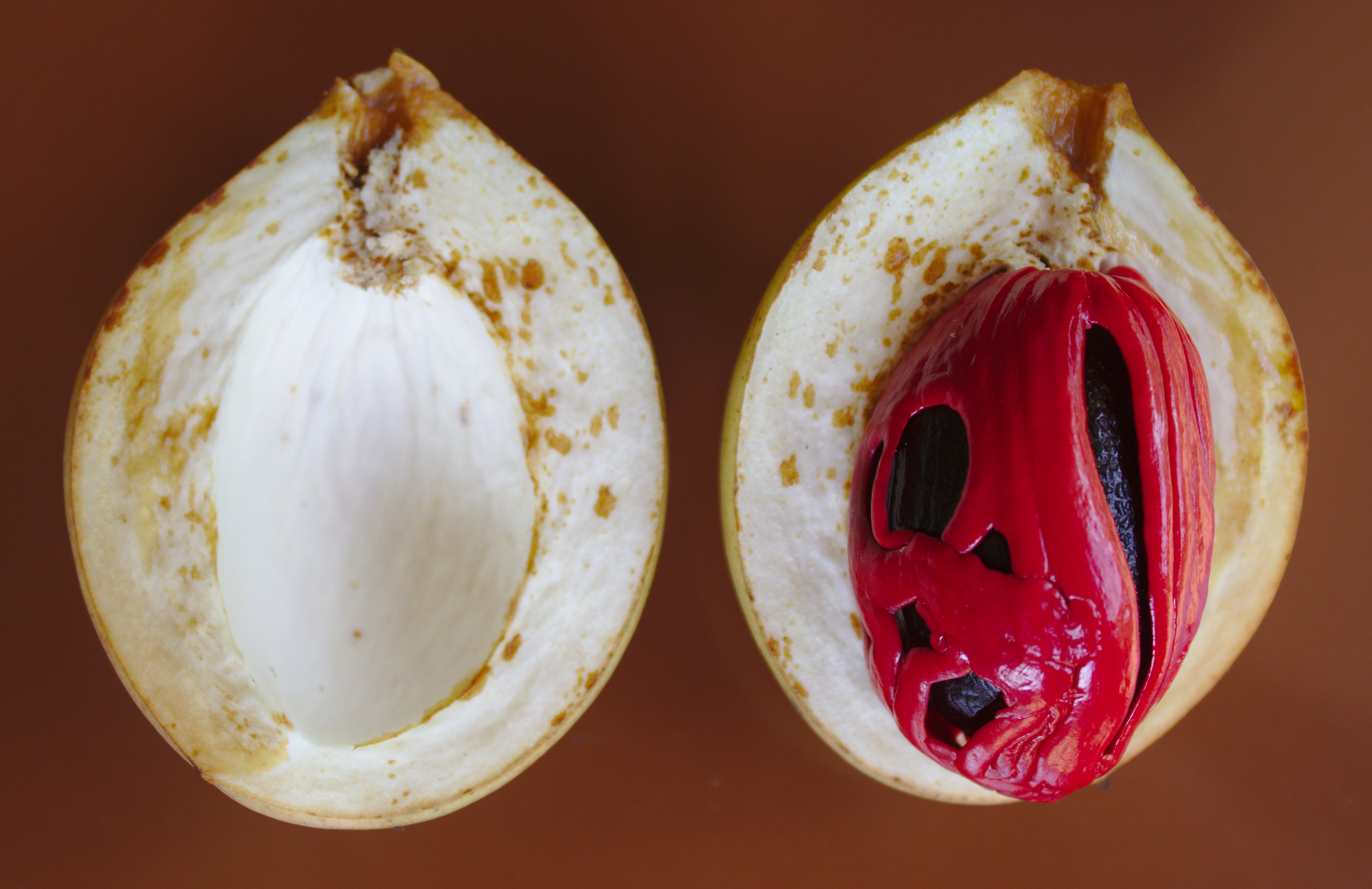
Red aril and seed within fruit

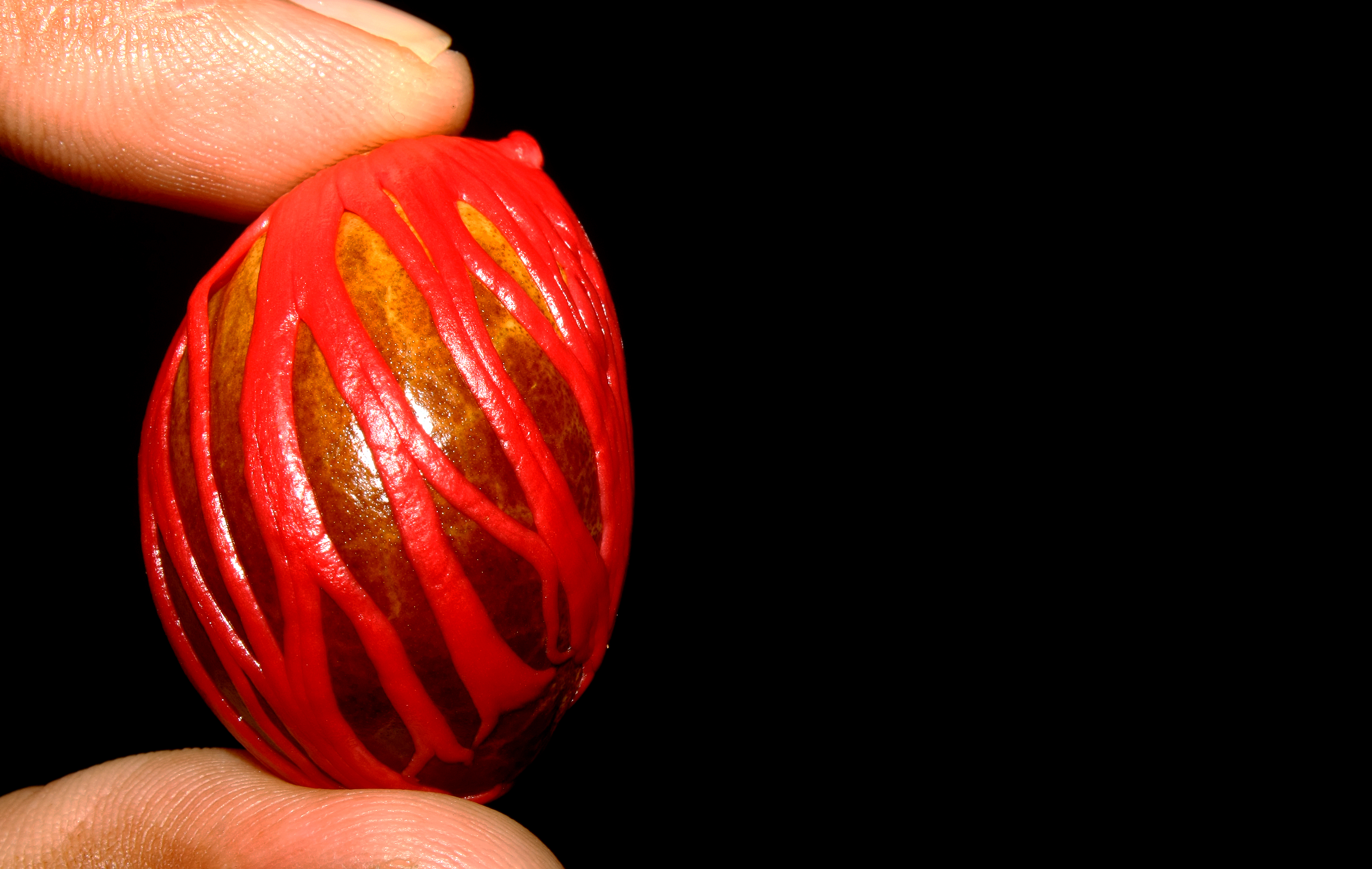
Aril surrounding nutmeg seed

== Uses ==
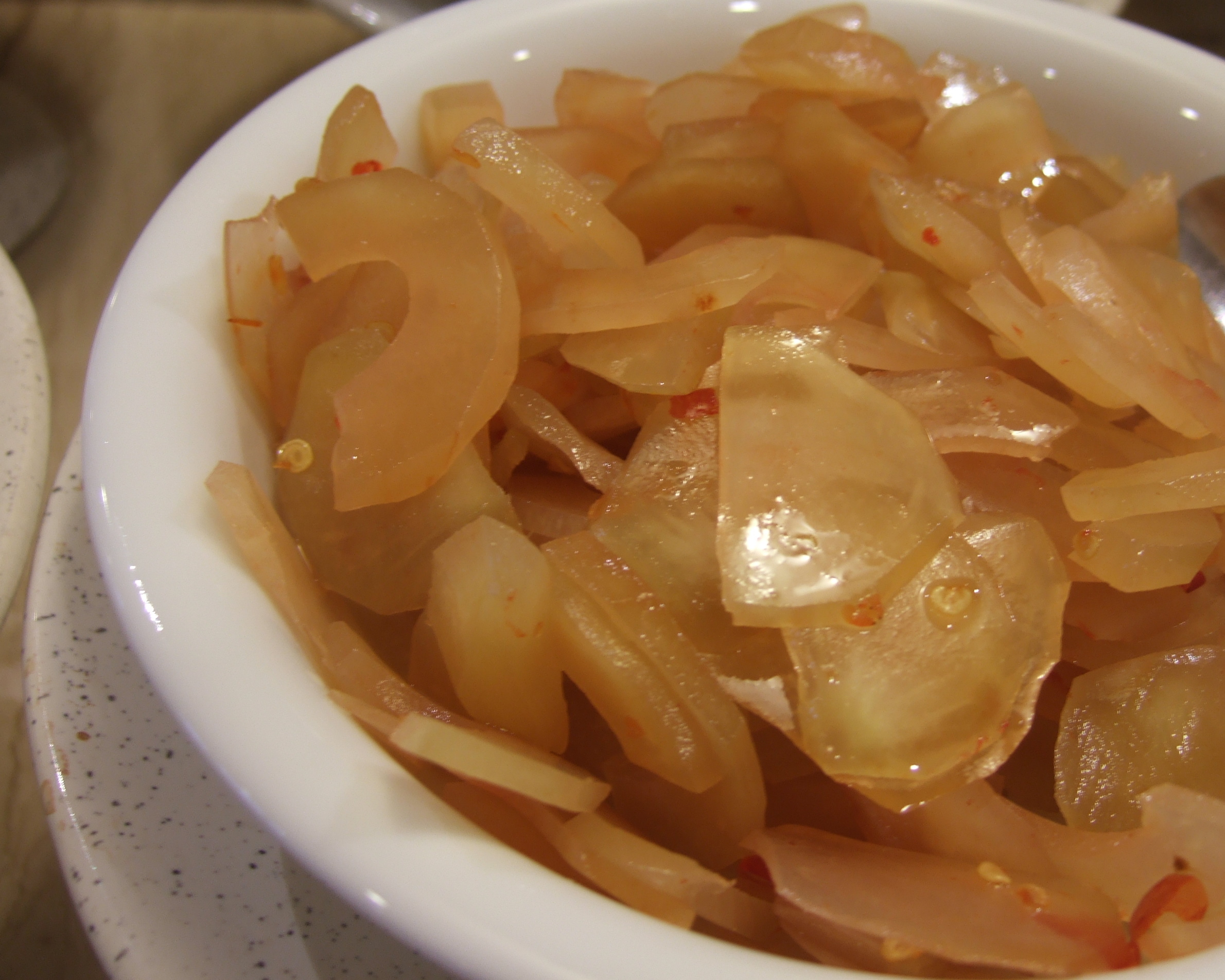
Indonesian manisan pala (nutmeg sweets)

=== Spice ===
Nutmeg and mace have similar sensory qualities, with nutmeg having a slightly sweeter and mace a more delicate flavor. Mace is often preferred in light dishes for the bright orange, saffron-like hue it imparts. Nutmeg is used for flavoring many dishes. Whole nutmeg can also be ground at home using a nutmeg grater or a multi-purpose grater.

In Indonesian cuisine, nutmeg is used in dishes such as spicy soups including variants of soto, konro, oxtail soup, sup iga (ribs soup), bakso, and sup kambing. It is also used in gravy for meat dishes, such as semur, beef stew, ribs with tomato, and European derived dishes such as bistik (beef steak), rolade (minced meat roll), and bistik lidah (beef tongue steak).

In Indian cuisine, nutmeg is used in many sweet, as well as savory, dishes. In Kerala's Malabar region, grated nutmeg is used in meat preparations and also sparingly added to desserts for the flavor. It may also be used in small quantities in garam masala.

In traditional European cuisine, nutmeg and mace are used especially in potato and spinach dishes and in processed meat products; they are also used in soups, sauces, and baked goods. It is also commonly used in rice pudding. In Dutch cuisine, nutmeg is added to vegetables such as Brussels sprouts, cauliflower, and string beans. Nutmeg is a traditional ingredient in mulled cider, mulled wine, junket and eggnog. In Scotland, mace and nutmeg are usually both ingredients in haggis. In Italian cuisine, nutmeg is used as part of the stuffing for many regional meat-filled dumplings like tortellini, as well as for the traditional meatloaf. Nutmeg is a common spice for pumpkin pie and in recipes for other winter squashes, such as baked acorn squash. In the Caribbean, nutmeg is often used in drinks, such as the Bushwacker, Painkiller, and Barbados rum punch. Typically, it is a sprinkle on top of the drink.

=== Fruit ===
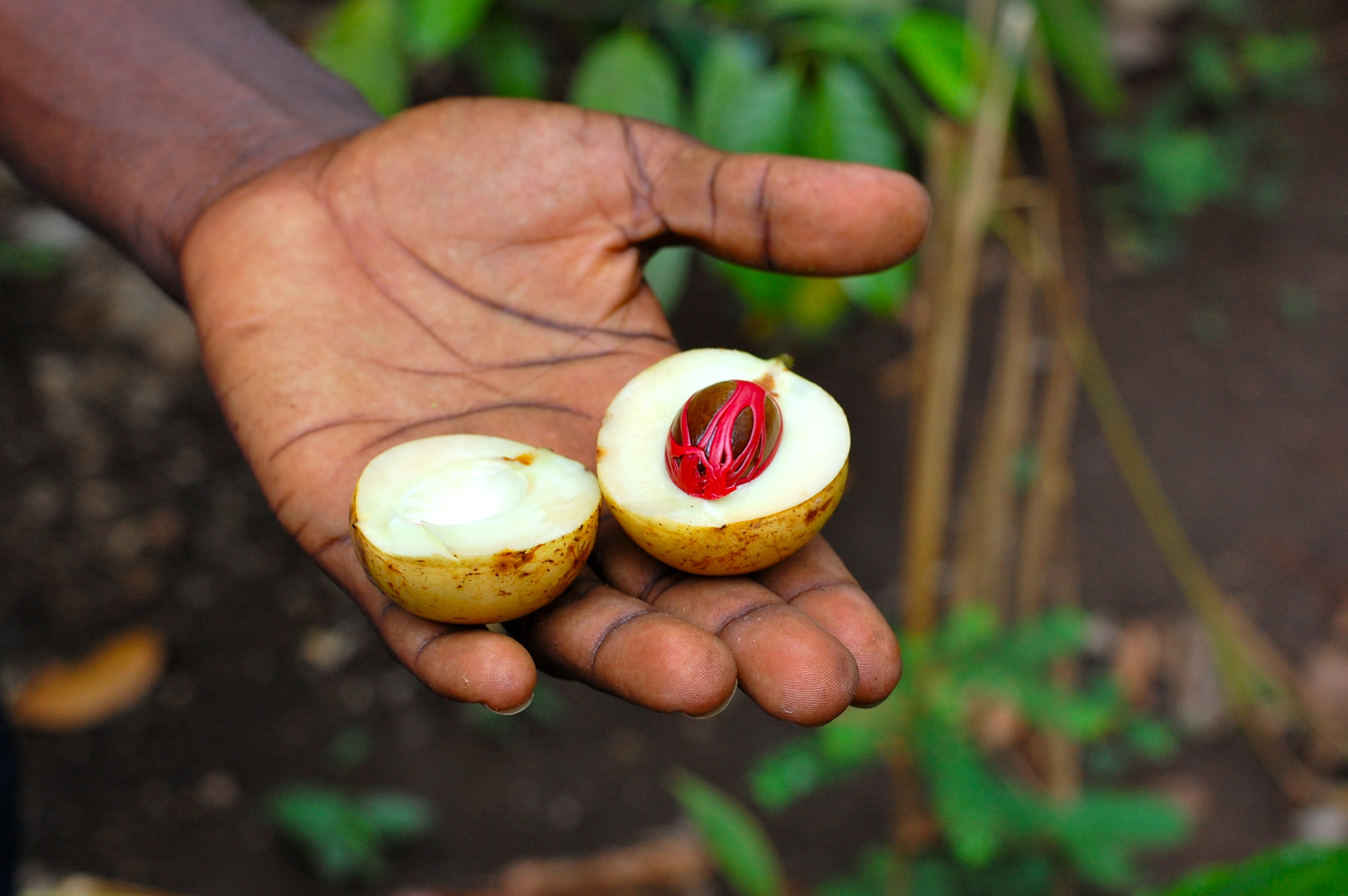
Fresh nutmeg in Zanzibar, Tanzania.

The pericarp (fruit covering) is used to make jam, or is finely sliced, cooked with sugar, and crystallised to make a fragrant candy. Sliced nutmeg fruit flesh is made as manisan (sweets), either wet, which is seasoned in sugary syrup liquid, or dry coated with sugar, a dessert called manisan pala in Indonesia. In Penang cuisine, dried, shredded nutmeg rind with sugar coating is used as toppings on the uniquely Penang ais kacang. The flesh of the nutmeg fruit is also blended, in the fresh state, into a type of smoothie (white in color and having a fresh, ‘green’, tangy taste); or boiled, resulting in a brown liquid, much sweeter in taste, which is used in the preparation of iced drinks. In Kerala Malabar region of India, it is used for juice, pickles and chutney.

=== Essential oil ===
The essential oil obtained by steam distillation of ground nutmeg is used in the perfumery and pharmaceutical industries. The volatile fraction contains dozens of terpenes and phenylpropanoids, including D-pinene, limonene, D-borneol, L-terpineol, geraniol, safrole, and myristicin. In its pure form, myristicin is a toxin, and consumption of excessive amounts of nutmeg can result in myristicin poisoning.

The oil is colorless or light yellow, and smells and tastes of nutmeg. It is used as a natural food flavoring in baked goods, syrups, beverages, and sweets. It is used to replace ground nutmeg, as it leaves no particles in the food. The essential oil is also used in the manufacturing of toothpaste and cough syrups.

=== Nutmeg butter ===
Nutmeg butter is obtained from the nut by expression, yielding a semisolid, reddish-brown oil having the taste and aroma of nutmeg itself. About 77% (by weight) of nutmeg butter is trimyristin, which can be manufactured into myristic acid, a 14-carbon fatty acid, with possible uses as a replacement for cocoa butter; it can be mixed with other fats like cottonseed oil or palm oil, and has applications as a lubricant.

== History ==
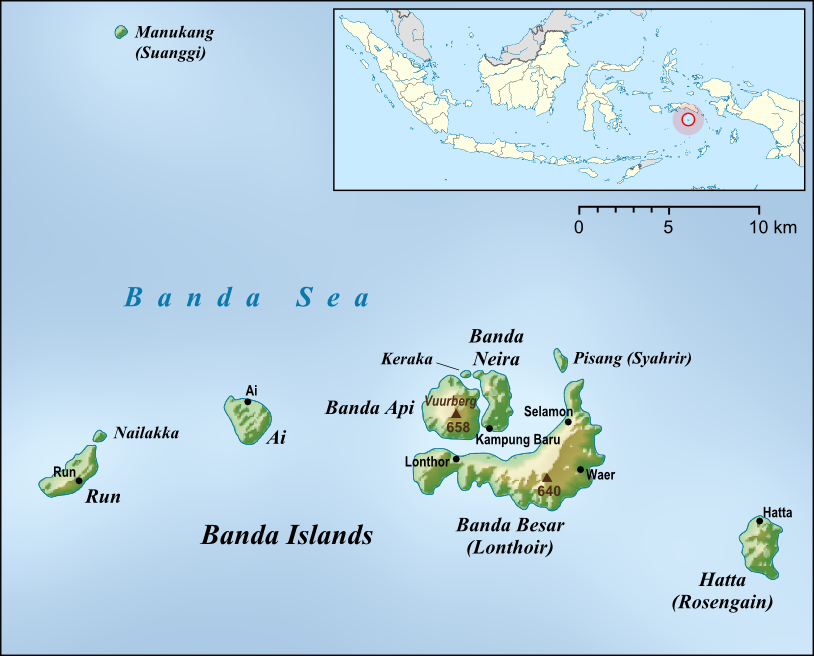
Map of the Banda Islands.

The earliest evidence of use of nutmeg comes in the form of 3,500-year-old potsherd residues from the island of Pulau Ai, one of the Banda Islands in eastern Indonesia. The Banda Islands consist of eleven small volcanic islands, and are part of the larger Maluku Islands group. These islands were the only source of nutmeg and mace production until the mid-19th century. It was one of the spices traded over the Austronesian maritime spice trade network since at least 1500 BCE.

In the sixth century AD, nutmeg use spread to India, then further west to Constantinople. By the 13th century, Arab traders had pinpointed the origin of nutmeg to the Banda Islands, but kept this location a secret from European traders.

=== Colonial era ===
The Banda Islands became the scene of the earliest European ventures in Asia, to get a grip on the spice trade. In August 1511, Afonso de Albuquerque conquered Malacca, which at the time was the hub of Asian trade, on behalf of the king of Portugal. In November of the same year, after having secured Malacca and learning of Banda's location, Albuquerque sent an expedition of three ships led by his friend António de Abreu to find it. Malay pilots guided them via Java, the Lesser Sundas, and Ambon to the Banda Islands, arriving in early 1512. The first Europeans to reach the Banda Islands, the expedition remained for about a month, buying and filling their ships with Banda's nutmeg and mace, and with cloves in which Banda had a thriving entrepôt trade. An early account of Banda is in Suma Oriental, a book written by the Portuguese apothecary Tomé Pires, based in Malacca from 1512 to 1515. Full control of this trade by the Portuguese was not possible, and they remained participants without a foothold in the islands.

In 1616, English Commander Nathaniel Courthope took control of the Island of Run in the name of King James I. He established a contract with the native Bandanese, who swore allegiance to the King. For the next five years, Courthope successfully defended the island until his death in 1620. Afterwards, the English abandoned the island, and it came under Dutch control.

In order to obtain a monopoly on the production and trade of nutmeg, the Dutch East India Company (VOC) waged a bloody battle with the Bandanese in 1621. Historian Willard Hanna estimated that before this struggle the islands were populated by approximately 15,000 people, and only 1,000 were left (the Bandanese were killed, starved while fleeing, exiled, or sold as slaves). The Company constructed a comprehensive nutmeg plantation system on the islands during the 17th century. In later negotiations during the Treaty of Breda, the British ceded control of Run Island to the Dutch, in exchange for control of the island of New Amsterdam (modern day Manhattan). To quote the author of Nathaniels Nutmeg, "Yet the stand he [Nathaniel Courthope] made on Run, was to reshape history on the other side of the world, and although his death robbed England of her nutmeg, it gave her the biggest of apples".

As a result of the Dutch interregnum during the Napoleonic Wars, the British invaded and temporarily took control of the Banda Islands from the Dutch and transplanted nutmeg trees, complete with soil, to Sri Lanka, Penang, Bencoolen, and Singapore. From these locations, they were transplanted to their other colonial holdings elsewhere, notably Zanzibar and Grenada. The national flag of Grenada, adopted in 1974, shows a stylised split-open nutmeg fruit. The Dutch retained control of the Spice Islands until World War II.

Connecticut may have received its nickname ("the Nutmeg State", "Nutmegger") from the claim that some unscrupulous Connecticut traders would whittle "nutmeg" out of wood, creating a "wooden nutmeg", a term which later came to mean any type of fraud. This narrative may have to do with the issue that one has to grate to obtain the spice powder, not crack a nutmeg, and this may not have been widely known by some purchasers of the product.

== Production ==
In 2024, world production of nutmeg (combined with cardamom) was 197,199 tonnes, led by Guatemala with 76,339 tonnes and India and Indonesia as secondary producers (94,477 tonnes combined); the three countries accounted for 87% of the world total.

== Psychoactivity and toxicity ==
Although used as a folk treatment for some ailments, nutmeg has no proven medicinal value.

=== Effects ===
Ingested in small amounts as a spice, nutmeg produces no noticeable physiological or neurological response, but in large doses, both raw nutmeg freshly ground from kernels and nutmeg oil have psychoactive effects. Such effects appear to derive from anticholinergic-like hallucinogenic mechanisms attributed to myristicin and elemicin. Myristicin—a monoamine oxidase inhibitor and psychoactive substance—can cause convulsions, palpitations, nausea, eventual dehydration, and generalized body pain when consumed in large amounts. Neither myristicin nor elemicin produce the head-twitch response, a behavioral proxy of psychedelic effects, in rodents. However, in another study, elemicin did produce the head-twitch response. Nutmeg may interact with anxiolytic drugs, produce allergic reactions, cause contact dermatitis, and evoke acute episodes of psychosis.

Varying considerably from person to person, nutmeg intoxication may occur with side effects, such as delirium, anxiety, confusion, headaches, nausea, dizziness, dry mouth, eye irritation, and amnesia. Intoxication takes several hours to reach maximum effect, and may last for several days. Incidents of fatal poisoning from nutmeg and myristicin individually are uncommon.

Nutmeg poisonings occur by accidental consumption in children and by intentional recreational use. It is used recreationally with the intention of achieving a low-cost high resembling psychedelics, particularly by adolescents, drug users, college students, and prisoners. Relatively large doses of nutmeg are required to produce effects; a majority of reported nutmeg intoxication cases appear to result from recreational use.

The pharmacology of nutmeg and its constituents has been reviewed.

=== Toxicity during pregnancy ===
Nutmeg was once considered an abortifacient, but may be safe during pregnancy if used only in flavoring amounts. If consumed in large amounts, nutmeg could cause premature labor and miscarriage. Nutmeg may also interact with pain relievers such as pethidine, so avoiding it during pregnancy is recommended.

=== Toxicity to pets ===
The scent of nutmeg may attract pets, but it can be poisonous if consumed in excess.

== See also ==
- Spice trade
- Domesticated plants and animals of Austronesia
- Cloves
- Indian sandalwood
- PiHKAL § Essential amphetamines
