= List of Myristica species =

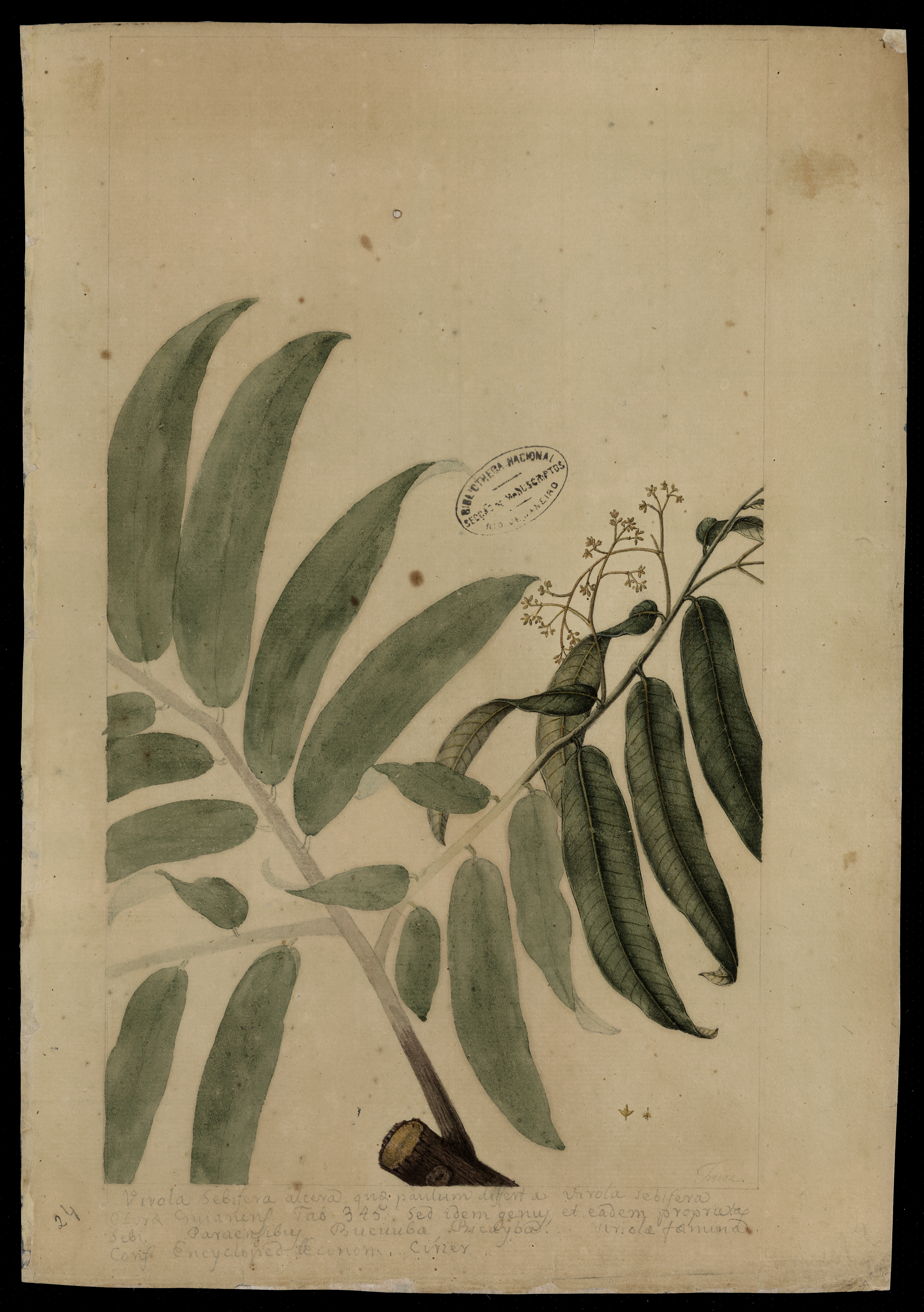
Myristica in the Coleção Brasiliana Iconográfica

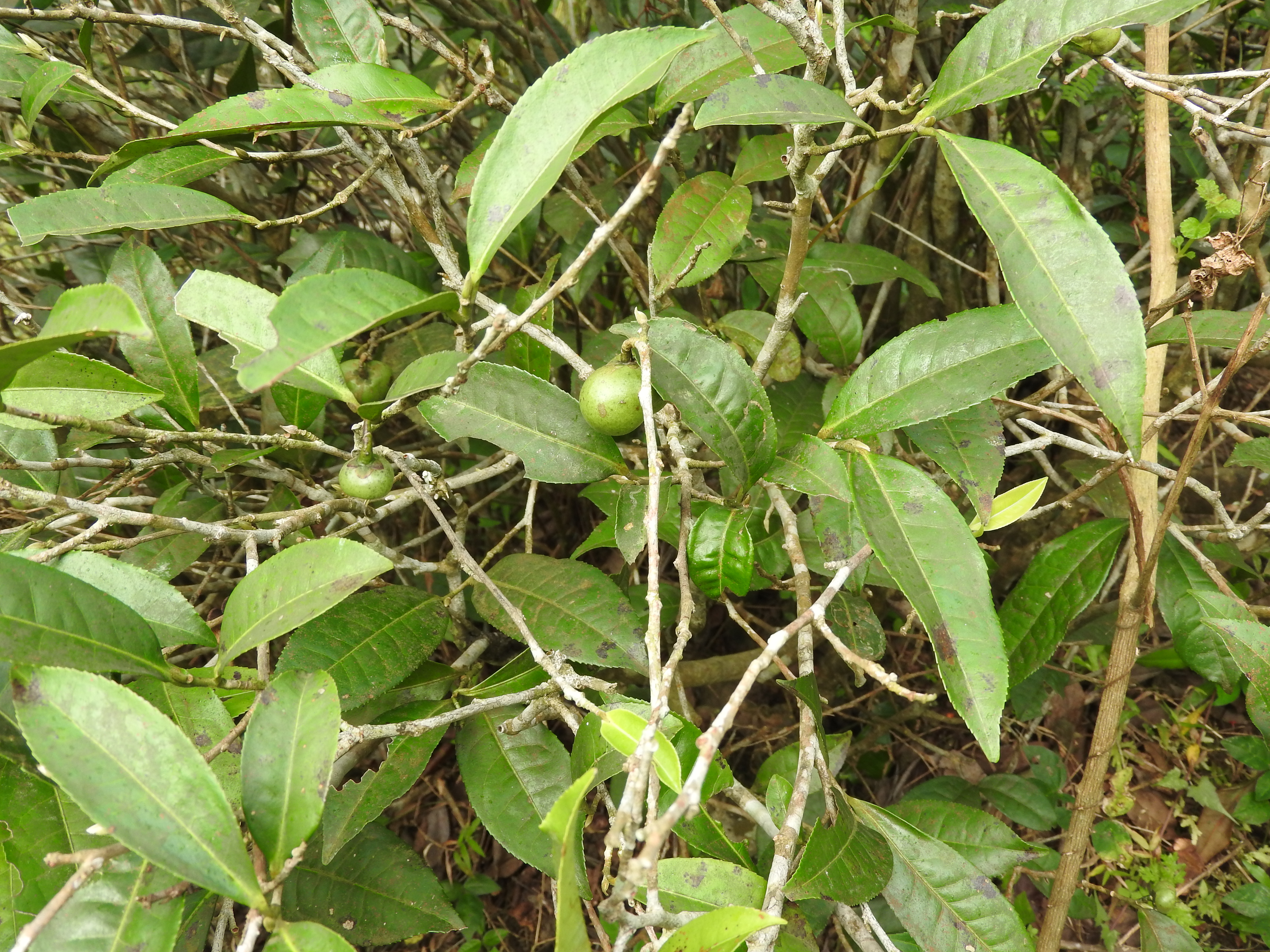
Myristica beddomei growing in Kerala

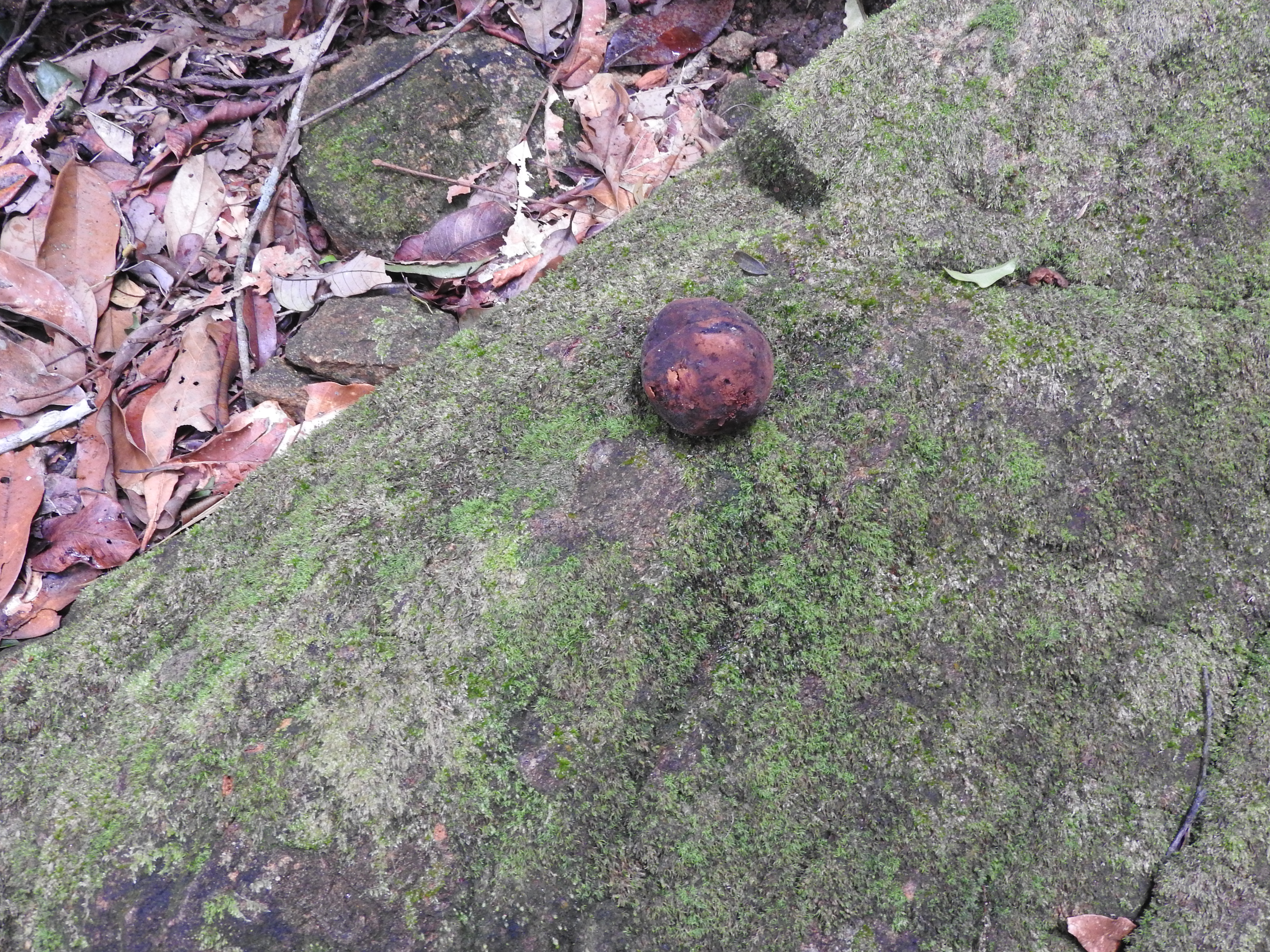
Myristica beddomei growing in Kerala

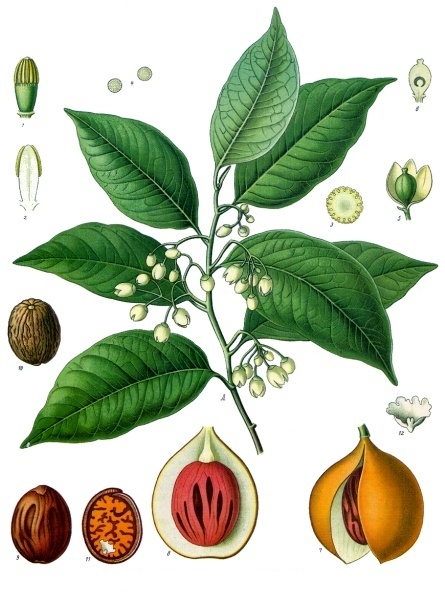
Myristica fragrans

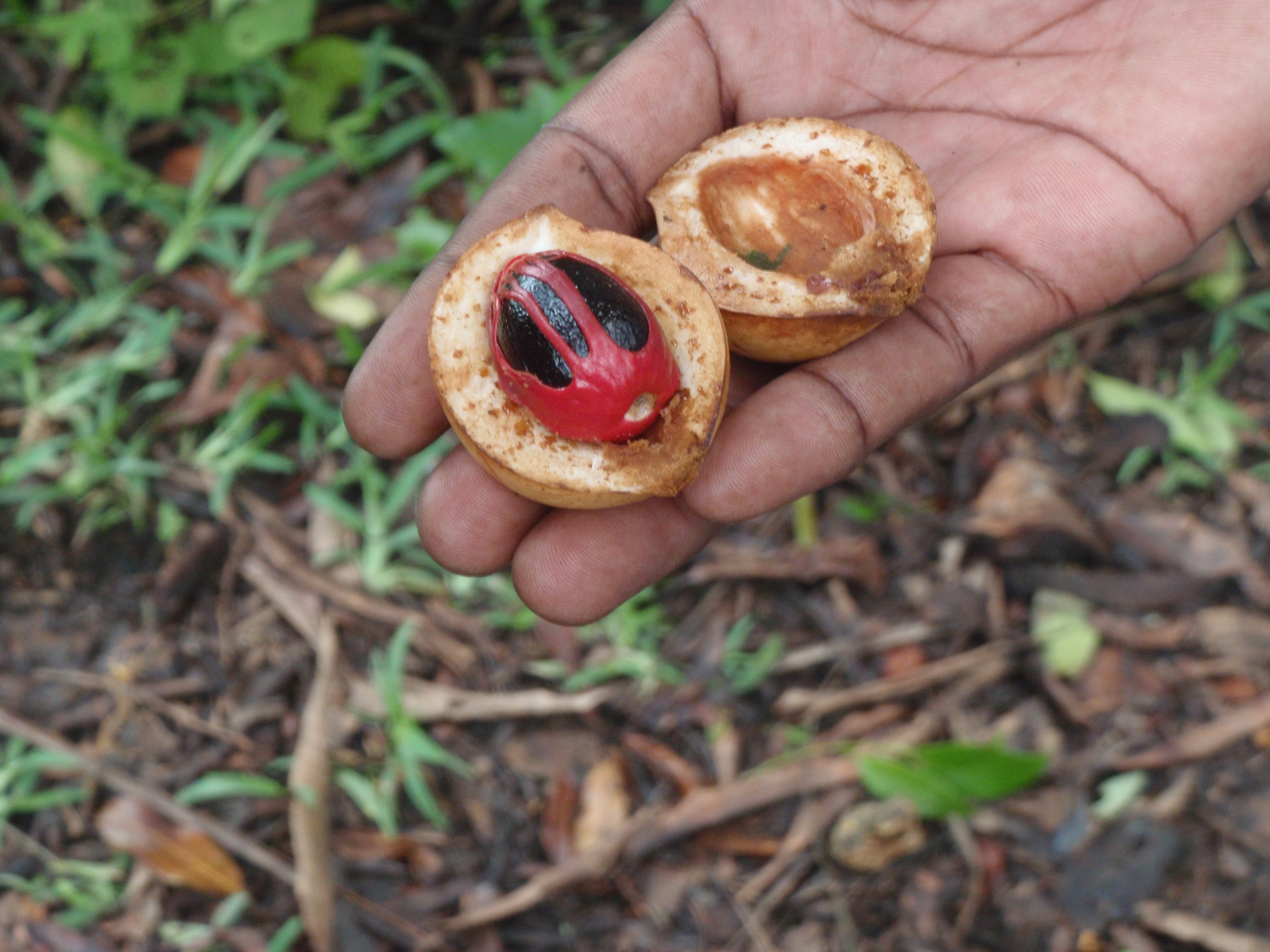
Myristica fragrans

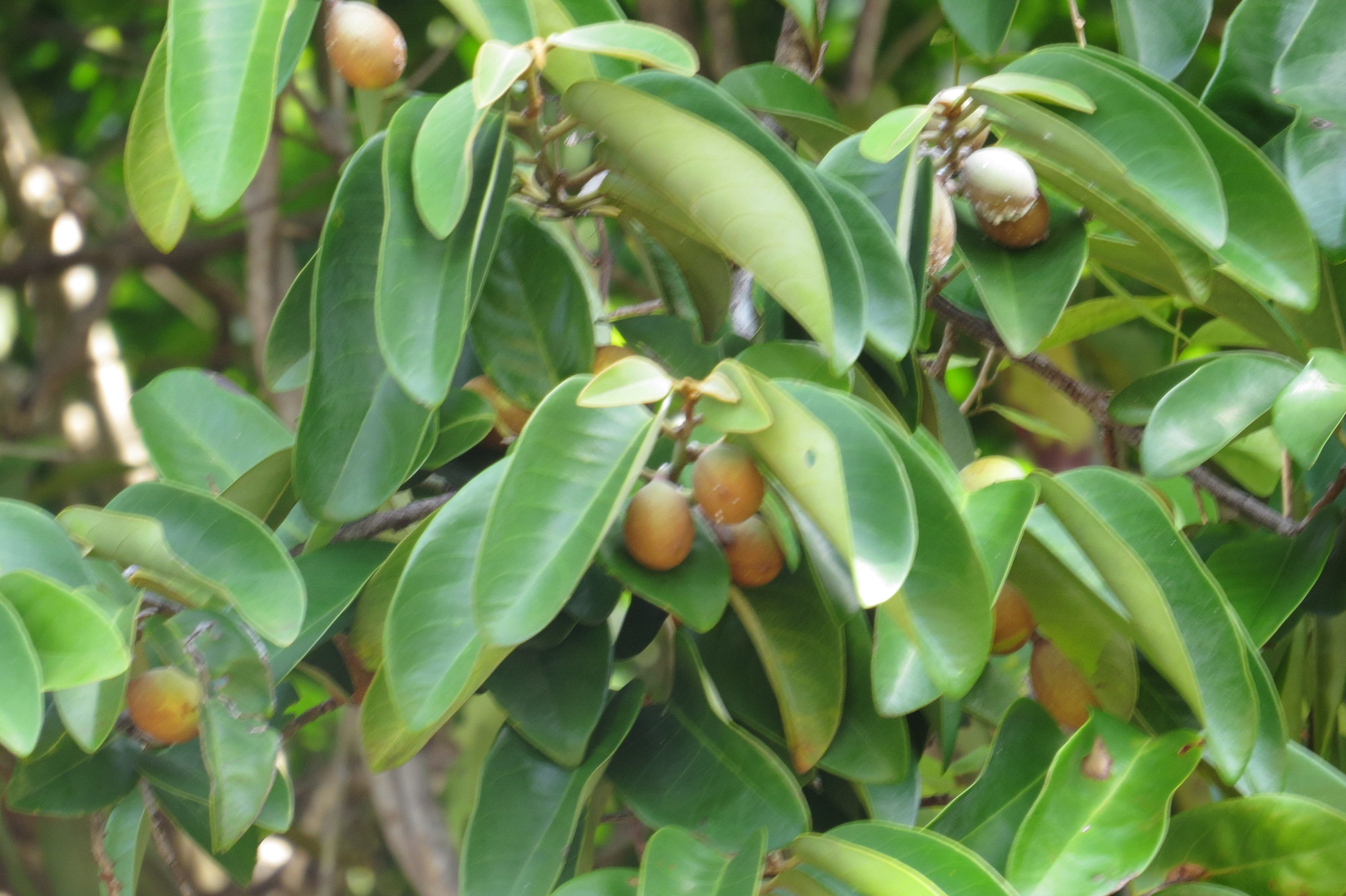
Myristica globosa

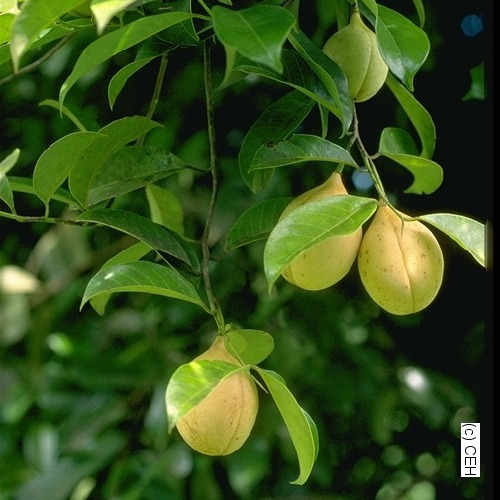
Myristica malabarica

Myristica is a genus of trees in the family Myristicaceae. As of November 2025, Plants of the World Online accepts the following 173 species:

- Myristica acsmithii W.J.de Wilde
- Myristica agusanensis Elmer
- Myristica alba W.J.de Wilde
- Myristica andamanica Hook.f.
- Myristica archboldiana A.C.Sm.
- Myristica arfakensis W.J.de Wilde
- Myristica argentea Warb.
- Myristica atrescens W.J.de Wilde
- Myristica atrocorticata W.J.de Wilde
- Myristica basilanica W.J.de Wilde
- Myristica beccarii Warb.
- Myristica beddomei King
- Myristica bialata Warb.
- Myristica bifurcata (J.Sinclair) W.J.de Wilde
- Myristica borneensis Warb.
- Myristica brachypoda W.J.de Wilde
- Myristica brassii A.C.Sm.
- Myristica brevistipes W.J.de Wilde
- Myristica buchneriana Warb.
- Myristica byssacea W.J.de Wilde
- Myristica cagayanensis Merr.
- Myristica carrii J.Sinclair
- Myristica castaneifolia A.Gray
- Myristica cerifera A.C.Sm.
- Myristica ceylanica A.DC.
- Myristica chartacea Gillespie
- Myristica chrysophylla J.Sinclair
- Myristica cinnamomea King
- Myristica clemensii A.C.Sm.
- Myristica coacta W.J.de Wilde
- Myristica colinridsdalei W.J.de Wilde
- Myristica concinna J.Sinclair
- Myristica conspersa W.J.de Wilde
- Myristica cornutiflora J.Sinclair
- Myristica corticata W.J.de Wilde
- Myristica crassa King
- Myristica crassipes Warb.
- Myristica cucullata Markgr.
- Myristica cumingii Warb.
- Myristica cylindrocarpa J.Sinclair
- Myristica dactyloides Gaertn.
- Myristica dasycarpa W.J.de Wilde
- Myristica depressa W.J.de Wilde
- Myristica devogelii W.J.de Wilde
- Myristica duplopunctata W.J.de Wilde
- Myristica elliptica Wall. ex Hook.f. & Thomson
- Myristica ensifolia J.Sinclair
- Myristica extensa W.J.de Wilde
- Myristica fallax Warb.
- Myristica fasciculata W.J.de Wilde
- Myristica fatua Houtt.
- Myristica filipes W.J.de Wilde
- Myristica firmipes J.Sinclair
- Myristica fissiflora W.J.de Wilde
- Myristica fissurata W.J.de Wilde
- Myristica flavovirens W.J.de Wilde
- Myristica flosculosa J.Sinclair
- Myristica fragrans Houtt.
- Myristica frugifera W.J.de Wilde
- Myristica fugax W.J.de Wilde
- Myristica fusca Markgr.
- Myristica fusiformis W.J.de Wilde
- Myristica garciniifolia Warb.
- Myristica gigantea King
- Myristica gillespieana A.C.Sm.
- Myristica globosa Warb.
- Myristica gracilipes J.Sinclair
- Myristica grandifolia A.DC.
- Myristica guadalcanalensis W.J.de Wilde
- Myristica guatteriifolia A.DC.
- Myristica guillauminiana A.C.Sm.
- Myristica hollrungii Warb.
- Myristica hooglandii J.Sinclair
- Myristica hypargyraea A.Gray
- Myristica impressa Warb.
- Myristica impressinervia J.Sinclair
- Myristica inaequalis W.J.de Wilde
- Myristica incredibilis W.J.de Wilde
- Myristica iners Blume
- Myristica ingens (Foreman) W.J.de Wilde
- Myristica ingrata W.J.de Wilde
- Myristica inopinata J.Sinclair
- Myristica insipida R.Br.
- Myristica inundata W.J.de Wilde
- Myristica inutilis Rich. ex A.Gray
- Myristica johnsii W.J.de Wilde
- Myristica kajewskii A.C.Sm.
- Myristica kalkmanii W.J.de Wilde
- Myristica kjellbergii W.J.de Wilde
- Myristica koordersii Warb.
- Myristica laevifolia W.J.de Wilde
- Myristica laevis W.J.de Wilde
- Myristica lancifolia Poir.
- Myristica lasiocarpa W.J.de Wilde
- Myristica lepidota Blume
- Myristica leptophylla W.J.de Wilde
- Myristica longepetiolata W.J.de Wilde
- Myristica longipes Warb.
- Myristica lowiana King
- Myristica macrantha A.C.Sm.
- Myristica magnifica Bedd.
- Myristica maingayi Hook.f.
- Myristica malabarica Lam.
- Myristica malaccensis Hook.f.
- Myristica markgraviana A.C.Sm.
- Myristica maxima Warb.
- Myristica mediovibex W.J.de Wilde
- Myristica mediterranea W.J.de Wilde
- Myristica millepunctata W.J.de Wilde
- Myristica mindanaensis Warb.
- Myristica nana W.J.de Wilde
- Myristica neglecta Warb.
- Myristica nivea Merr.
- Myristica olivacea W.J.de Wilde
- Myristica ornata W.J.de Wilde
- Myristica ovicarpa W.J.de Wilde
- Myristica pachycarpidia W.J.de Wilde
- Myristica pachyphylla A.C.Sm.
- Myristica papillatifolia W.J.de Wilde
- Myristica papyracea J.Sinclair
- Myristica pedicellata J.Sinclair
- Myristica perlaevis W.J.de Wilde
- Myristica petiolata A.C.Sm.
- Myristica philippensis Lam.
- Myristica pilosella W.J.de Wilde
- Myristica pilosigemma W.J.de Wilde
- Myristica psilocarpa W.J.de Wilde
- Myristica pubicarpa W.J.de Wilde
- Myristica pumila W.J.de Wilde
- Myristica pushpangadaniana M.G.Govind & Dan ex Kottaim.
- Myristica pygmaea W.J.de Wilde
- Myristica quercicarpa (J.Sinclair) W.J.de Wilde
- Myristica robusta W.J.de Wilde
- Myristica rosselensis J.Sinclair
- Myristica rubrinervis W.J.de Wilde
- Myristica rumphii (Blume) Kosterm.
- Myristica sangowoensis (J.Sinclair) W.J.de Wilde
- Myristica sarcantha W.J.de Wilde
- Myristica schlechteri W.J.de Wilde
- Myristica schleinitzii Engl.
- Myristica scripta W.J.de Wilde
- Myristica simiarum A.DC.
- Myristica simulans W.J.de Wilde
- Myristica sinclairii W.J.de Wilde
- Myristica smythiesii J.Sinclair
- Myristica sogeriensis W.J.de Wilde
- Myristica sphaerosperma A.C.Sm.
- Myristica subalulata Miq.
- Myristica subcordata Blume
- Myristica succedanea Blume
- Myristica sulcata Warb.
- Myristica sumbavana Warb.
- Myristica tamrauensis W.J.de Wilde
- Myristica tenuivenia J.Sinclair
- Myristica teysmannii Miq.
- Myristica trianthera W.J.de Wilde
- Myristica tristis Warb.
- Myristica trobogarii M.G.Govind & Dan
- Myristica tubiflora Blume
- Myristica ultrabasica W.J.de Wilde
- Myristica umbrosa J.Sinclair
- Myristica uncinata J.Sinclair
- Myristica undulatifolia J.Sinclair
- Myristica velutina Markgr.
- Myristica verruculosa W.J.de Wilde
- Myristica villosa Warb.
- Myristica vinkeana W.J.de Wilde
- Myristica warburgii K.Schum.
- Myristica wenzelii Merr.
- Myristica womersleyi J.Sinclair
- Myristica wyatt-smithii Airy Shaw
- Myristica xylocarpa W.J.de Wilde
- Myristica yunnanensis Y.H.Li
