= Hyledius regalis =

Scientific classification
- Kingdom: Animalia
- Phylum: Arthropoda
- Class: Insecta
- Order: Coleoptera
- Suborder: Polyphaga
- Infraorder: Cucujiformia
- Family: Curculionidae
- Genus: Hyledius
- Species: H. regalis

Binomial name
- Hyledius regalis Wood & Bright, 1992

Species of beetle

Hyledius regalis is a species of weevil found in Sri Lanka.

It is a small reddish color beetle and the host plant is Myristica dactyloides.
