= Myristica chartacea =

Conservation status
- Least Concern (IUCN 3.1)

Scientific classification
- Kingdom: Plantae
- Clade: Embryophytes
- Clade: Tracheophytes
- Clade: Spermatophytes
- Clade: Angiosperms
- Clade: Magnoliids
- Order: Magnoliales
- Family: Myristicaceae
- Genus: Myristica
- Species: M. chartacea

Binomial name
- Myristica chartacea Gillespie (1931)

Species of flowering plant

Myristica chartacea is a species of flowering plant in the nutmeg family, Myristicaceae. It is a tree endemic to Fiji.

Myristica chartacea is an evergreen tree which grows up to 24 meters tall. It flowers and sets fruit throughout the year.

It is native to the islands of Viti Levu, Vanua Levu, Gau, and Ovalau. It grows in both primary and secondary tropical moist forest, from 50 to 900 meters elevation. Its seedlings prefer shade for growth. It is common across its range.

Timber from the tree is used for a variety of local purposes, and is exported. Export is limited by a quota, and the species is replanted. Timber harvesting and other human activities are not considered major threats to the species, and its conservation status is assessed as least concern.
