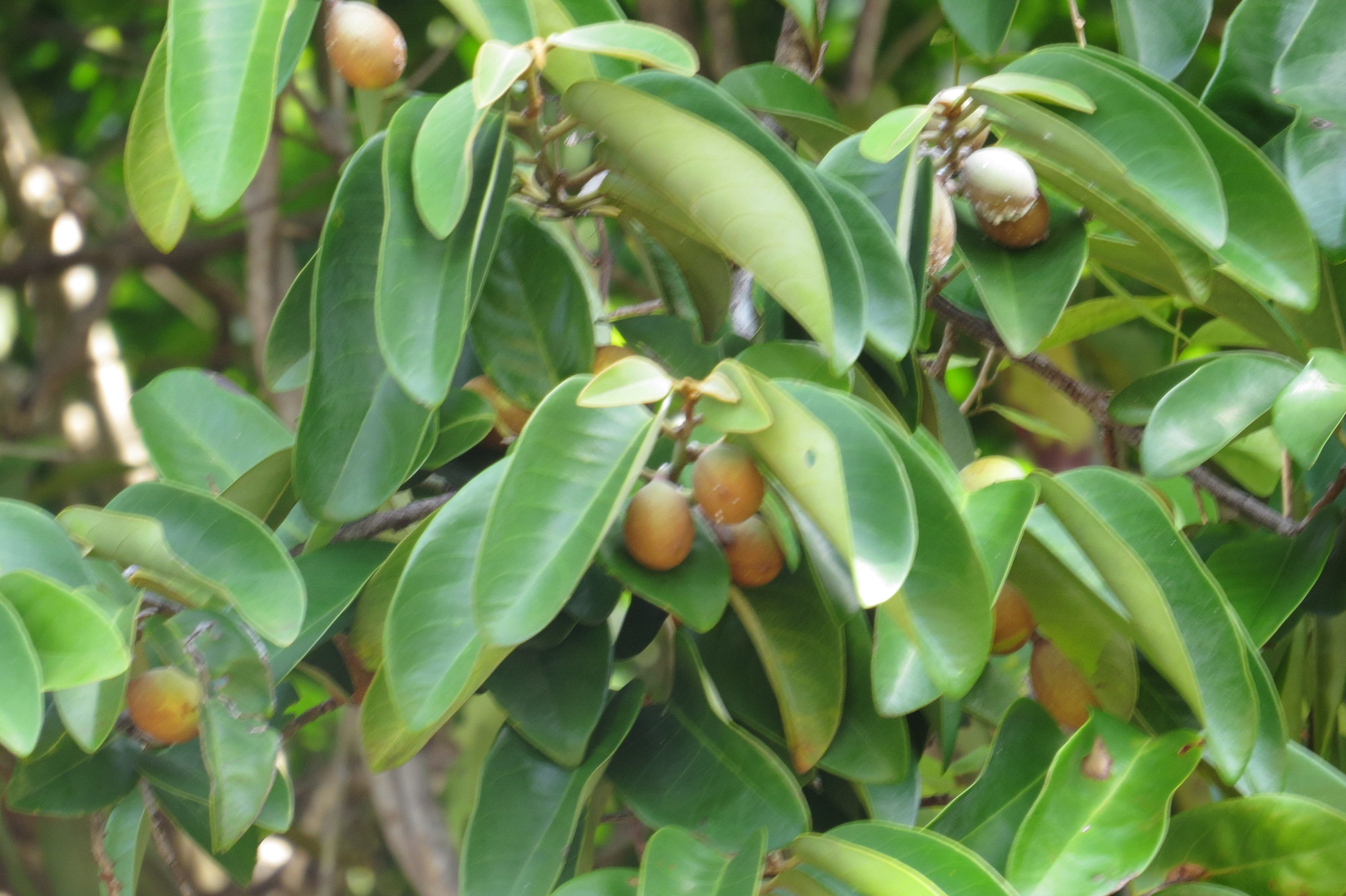
- In Queensland, Australia

Conservation status
- Least Concern (IUCN 3.1)
- Least Concern (NCA)

Scientific classification
- Kingdom: Plantae
- Clade: Embryophytes
- Clade: Tracheophytes
- Clade: Spermatophytes
- Clade: Angiosperms
- Clade: Magnoliids
- Order: Magnoliales
- Family: Myristicaceae
- Genus: Myristica
- Species: M. globosa

Binomial name
- Myristica globosa Warb.

= Myristica globosa =

Species of flowering plant

Myristica globosa is a species of flowering plant in the family Myristicaceae. It is a tree native to New Guinea, New Britain, the Solomon Islands, and Queensland, Australia.

Two subspecies are recognised:

- M. globosa subsp. chalmersii (Warb.) W.J.de Wilde, found in New Guinea, the Bismark Archipelago and the Solomon Islands
- M. globosa subsp. muelleri (Warb.) W.J.de Wilde (Queensland nutmeg) found in Queensland and the Solomon Islands.
