= Myristica acsmithii =

Scientific classification
- Kingdom: Plantae
- Clade: Tracheophytes
- Clade: Angiosperms
- Clade: Magnoliids
- Order: Magnoliales
- Family: Myristicaceae
- Genus: Myristica
- Species: M. acsmithii

Binomial name
- Myristica acsmithii W.J.de Wilde (1994)

Species of flowering plant

Myristica acsmithii is a species of flowering plant in the nutmeg family, Myristicaceae. It is a tree endemic to Fiji.
