= Myristica beddomei =

- Myristica beddomei leaves and fruits

Conservation status
- Least Concern (IUCN 3.1)

Scientific classification
- Kingdom: Plantae
- Clade: Embryophytes
- Clade: Tracheophytes
- Clade: Spermatophytes
- Clade: Angiosperms
- Clade: Magnoliids
- Order: Magnoliales
- Family: Myristicaceae
- Genus: Myristica
- Species: M. beddomei

Binomial name
- Myristica beddomei King

Species of flowering plant

Myristica beddomei is a species of tree in the family Myristicaceae. It is endemic to the Western Ghats, India, where it is frequent in the mid-elevation wet evergreen forests and an important food tree of hornbills. The species has been earlier misidentified in regional floras and herbarium specimens as Myristica dactyloides Gaertn., the latter occurring only in Sri Lanka.

== Description ==
Canopy and sub-canopy trees in tropical wet evergreen forests, growing up to 25 m high. The trees have a smooth blackish green bark that peels off. Inner bark is deep red and when exposed or blazed produces a red exudate. The cylindrical branches are arranged in whorls around the trunk and are held horizontally almost perpendicular to the main trunk. The leaves are simple, alternate, and arranged in rows on opposite sides of the twigs (distichous) with a hairless petiole about 1.5 cm to 4 cm long that has a groove along the top (canaliculate). The leaf blade is thick and leathery, shining dark green above and whitish glaucous below. Leaves are variable in shape (oblong or elliptic to lanceolate), and about 12-25 cm long by 4-12 cm wide. The leaf apex is usually acute with a blunt tip or obtuse, while the base is acute to rounded.The leaf has an entire margin and a raised midrib. Venation includes 10 to 18 pairs of secondary nerves and tertiary nerves that are obscure or broadly reticulo-percurrent when visible.

Myristica beddomei is dioecious, with unisexual white flowers. The male flowers occur in clusters of 10-12 in short umbels in the axils of leaves, while female flowers are arranged in fascicles without stalks. The fruit is a distinctive egg-shaped, tomentose capsule, yellowish brown to orange in colour about 6 cm long by 3-4 cm in diameter, and with a shallow groove on the surface. When ripe, the capsule dehisces open to reveal the single egg-shaped or ellipsoid dark brown seed covered in a bright orange red, deeply laciniate aril. The fruit was reported to have average dimensions of 63.4 mm length and 60.0 mm diameter, and mass of 77 g, while the corresponding seed measurements were 39.5 mm (length), 35.5 mm (diameter), and 19 g (mass).

== Taxonomy ==
Myristica beddomei differs from the Sri Lankan taxon M. dactyloides in leaf and flower characteristics. The latter has broadly lanceolate to broadly elliptic leaves with obtuse base, being brownish with indistinct veins on the underside. The male flowers have caducous bracteoles and the male flower buds are distinctly ellipsoid with pointed apex.

Myristica beddomei has three known subspecies: M. b. beddomei, M. b. ustulata and M. b. sphaerocarpa, with the former two subspecies sometimes wrongly identified as M. dactyloides in some regional floras and herbaria.

M. b. sphaerocarpa differs from M. b. beddomei in its leaf size (7–10 × 3–5.5 cm), having 7–10 pairs of lateral veins (versus 12–20 in the former), and globose shape to the fruits and seeds, besides having a 4 mm thick pericarp. M. b. ustulata differs from the M. b. beddomei in having 3–4 mm thick dry pericarp, and male flowers having 0.3–0.5 mm long blackish brown hairs and persistent bracteole.

== Common names ==
The species has a number of common names in English and Indian languages. Common English names include wild nutmeg and bitter nutmeg. The species is known as kattu jathikkai or kakaimunji jathikai in Tamil; jayaphal in Marathi; ran-jayaphal in Konkani; jayaphal, jajikai, or kaadu jajikai in Kannada; and patthapanu, adakkapayin, panthapayin, panu, chorapali, chithirapoovu, pasupathi, or pathiripoovu in Malayalam.

== Distribution and habitat ==
The species is found along the Western Ghats in Tamil Nadu, Kerala, Karnataka, Goa, and Maharashtra, in subtropical and tropical wet evergreen forests, in sholas and occasionally in Myristica swamps. The species occurs as sub-canopy trees in tropical wet evergreen forests from the foothills to an elevation of 1500 m. In the Anaimalai Hills, the species is reported to range between 500 m and 1400 m in elevation, evenly and sparsely distributed through mature rainforests but also occurring in transitional forest zones.

The distributional range of different sub-species is not clearly demarcated, with M. b. beddomei reported to occur in Karnataka, Kerala, Maharashtra and Tamil Nadu, M. b. sphaerocarpa in Karnataka, Kerala, and Tamil Nadu, and M. b. ustulata in Kerala and Tamil Nadu.
