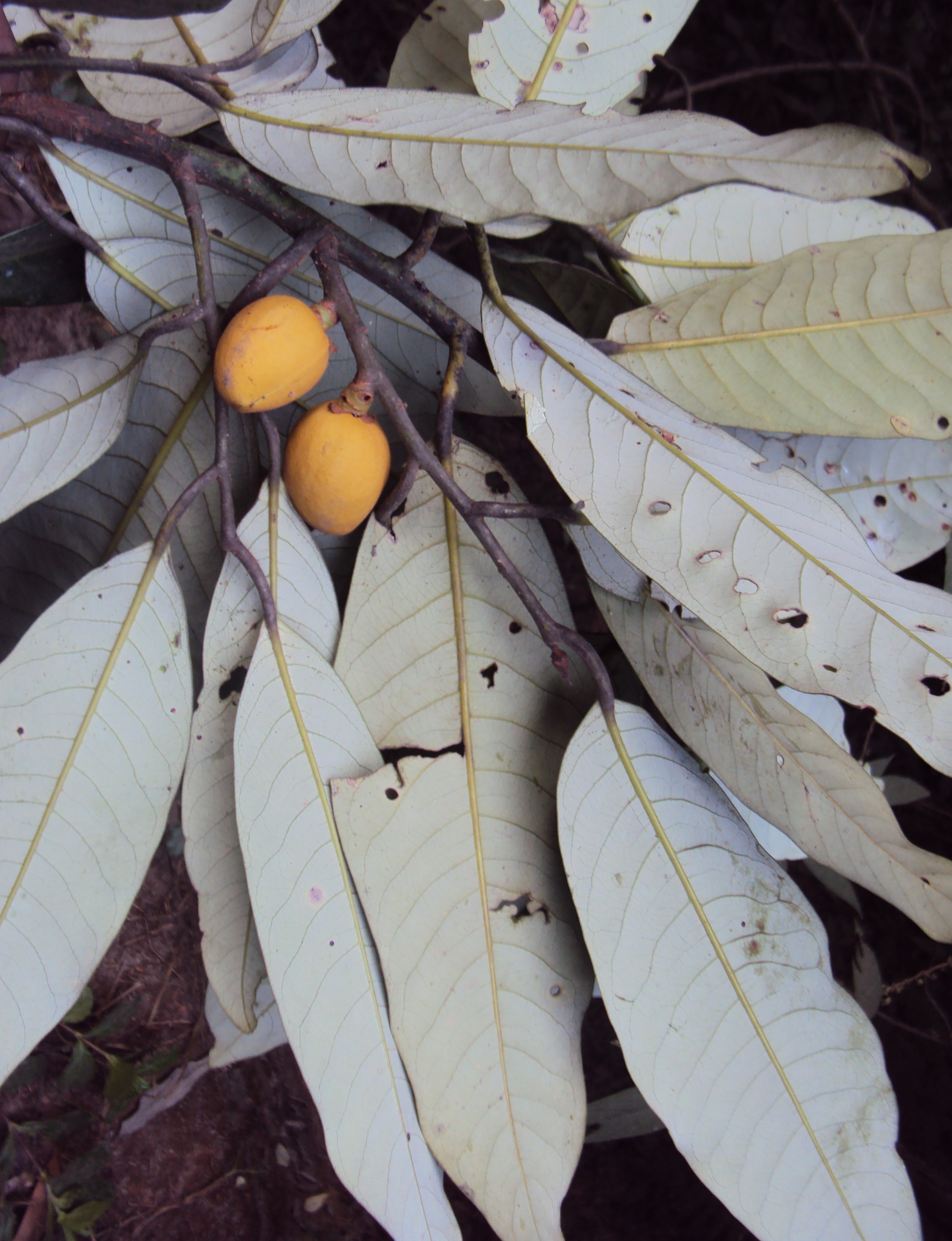
- Myristica dactyloides leaves and fruits

Conservation status
- Vulnerable (IUCN 3.1)

Scientific classification
- Kingdom: Plantae
- Clade: Embryophytes
- Clade: Tracheophytes
- Clade: Spermatophytes
- Clade: Angiosperms
- Clade: Magnoliids
- Order: Magnoliales
- Family: Myristicaceae
- Genus: Myristica
- Species: M. dactyloides

Binomial name
- Myristica dactyloides Gaertn.

= Myristica dactyloides =

Species of flowering plant

Myristica dactyloides is a species of flowering plant in the family Myristicaceae. It is a tree endemic to Sri Lanka. The species was earlier thought to occur in India because two subspecies of the related Myristica beddomei found in India, namely M. b. beddomei and M. b. ustulata, were wrongly identified as M. dactyloides Gaertn. in many herbarium specimens and regional floras.

Taxonomy

Myristica dactyloides differs from the Indian taxon M. beddomei in leaf and flower characteristics. The former has broadly lanceolate to broadly elliptic leaves with obtuse base, being brownish with indistinct veins on the underside. The male flowers have caducous bracteoles and the male flower buds are distinctly ellipsoid with pointed apex. Some sources have it as a synonym of Myristica malabarica.

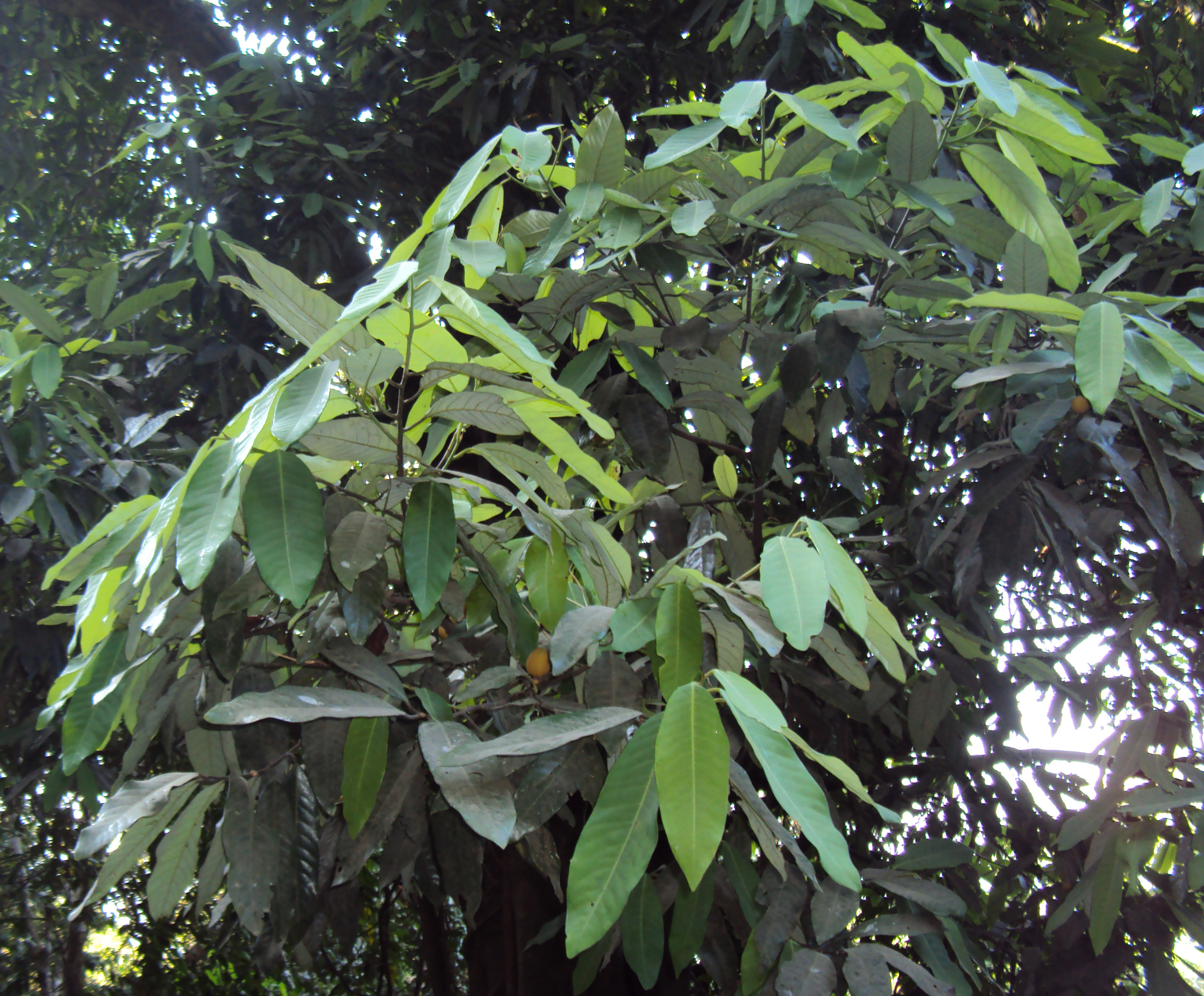
Myristica dactyloides habit
